= National Register of Historic Places listings in Morris County, New Jersey =

Location of Morris County in New Jersey

Contents: Counties and communities in New Jersey
Atlantic – Bergen (Closter, Franklin Lakes, Ridgewood, Saddle River, Wyckoff) – Burlington – Camden – Cape May – Cumberland – Essex – Gloucester – Hudson – Hunterdon – Mercer – Middlesex – Monmouth – Morris – Ocean – Passaic – Salem – Somerset – Sussex – Union – Warren

Morris County, New Jersey, United States, has 159 properties and districts listed on the National Register of Historic Places. Latitude and longitude coordinates of the sites listed on this page may be displayed in an online map.

This National Park Service list is complete through NPS recent listings posted September 11, 2026.

	Name on the Register	Image	Date listed	Location	City or town	Description
1	Acorn Hall	Acorn Hall	April 3, 1973 (#73001124)	68 Morris Ave. 40°47′48″N 74°27′38″W	Morristown	
2	Alnwick Hall	Alnwick Hall	April 11, 1985 (#85000783)	355 Madison Ave. 40°46′51″N 74°27′03″W	Morris Township	
3	Anthony–Corwin Farm	Anthony–Corwin Farm	May 1, 1992 (#92000371)	244 West Mill Road; 40°46′14″N 74°48′17″W	Washington Township	part of the Stone Houses and Outbuildings in Washington Township Multiple Property Submission (MPS)
4	Arch Bridge from the Boonton Ironworks	Arch Bridge from the Boonton Ironworks	September 1, 2022 (#100008042)	Grace Lord Park; 40°54′23″N 74°24′58″W	Boonton	Known as the Stone Arch Bridge over the Rockaway River
5	Ayres' Farm	Ayres' Farm	May 29, 1998 (#98000598)	25 Cooper Rd. 40°52′02″N 74°30′15″W	Denville	
6	Baker Building	Baker Building	July 1, 1981 (#81000396)	16 W. Blackwell St. S4703; 40°53′02″N 74°33′35″W	Dover	
7	Martin Berry House	Martin Berry House	June 19, 1973 (#73001129)	581 NJ 23 at Jackson Ave. 40°58′09″N 74°17′12″W	Pompton Plains	
8	Beverwyck Site	Beverwyck Site	May 14, 2004 (#04000430)	Southeast of the junction of US 46 and S. Beverwyck Rd. 40°51′41″N 74°23′03″W	Parsippany-Troy Hills	
9	Blackwell Street Historic District	Blackwell Street Historic District	May 21, 1982 (#82003287)	Blackwell and Sussex Streets; 40°53′04″N 74°33′34″W	Dover	
10	Boisaubin Manor	Boisaubin Manor	October 22, 1976 (#76001175)	Southeast of Morristown on Treadwell Avenue; 40°46′03″N 74°26′37″W	Chatham Township	
11	Boonton Historic District	Boonton Historic District	September 29, 1980 (#80002509)	Main, Church, Birch, Cornelia, and Cedar Streets; 40°54′22″N 74°24′37″W	Boonton	
12	Boonton Ironworks Historic District	Boonton Ironworks Historic District	July 14, 2023 (#100009115)	Plane Street, Grace Lord Park; 40°54′18″N 74°24′48″W	Boonton	Includes the Arch Bridge from the Boonton Ironworks
13	Boonton Public Library	Boonton Public Library	November 13, 1972 (#72000804)	619 Main Street; 40°54′19″N 74°24′39″W	Boonton	Known as Boonton Holmes Public Library
14	Bottle Hill Historic District	Bottle Hill Historic District	June 16, 2005 (#05000614)	James Park, 1-105 Ridgedale ave. 40°45′57″N 74°24′54″W	Madison	
15	David S. Bower House		November 30, 1982 (#82001045)	427 Main St. 40°44′33″N 74°23′26″W	Chatham	Probably demolished.
16	Bowers–Livingston–Osborn House	Bowers–Livingston–Osborn House	June 19, 1973 (#73001128)	25 Parsippany Road; 40°51′53″N 74°25′36″W	Parsippany	
17	Bowlsby-Degelleke House	Bowlsby-Degelleke House	December 15, 1978 (#78001784)	Northwest of Parsippany at 320 Baldwin Rd. 40°52′07″N 74°23′46″W	Parsippany	
18	Boyle/Hudspeth-Benson House	Boyle/Hudspeth-Benson House	February 10, 1975 (#75001151)	100 Basking Ridge Rd. 40°40′45″N 74°31′22″W	Millington	
19	Brookside Historic District	Brookside Historic District	February 16, 1996 (#96000041)	Bounded by Tingley Road, E. and W. Main Streets, Cold Hill Road and Cherry Lane; 40°47′39″N 74°34′07″W	Brookside	
20	Dr. Jabez Campfield House	Dr. Jabez Campfield House	September 4, 2008 (#08000837)	5 Olyphant Pl. 40°47′50″N 74°28′21″W	Morristown	
21	Lewis Carey Farmhouse	Lewis Carey Farmhouse	July 20, 1977 (#77000893)	208 Emmans Rd. 40°51′38″N 74°40′48″W	Flanders	
22	Cary Station	Cary Station	September 5, 1985 (#85002005)	239 Emmans Rd. 40°51′25″N 74°41′25″W	Ledgewood	
23	Stephen Cary House	Stephen Cary House	July 27, 1989 (#89000995)	Mountainside Rd. 40°47′26″N 74°35′56″W	Mendham	
24	George Chamberlain House	George Chamberlain House	December 2, 2009 (#09000973)	315 Dover-Milton Rd. 41°01′12″N 74°31′40″W	Jefferson Township	
25	Chester House Inn	Chester House Inn	July 18, 1974 (#74001183)	Main Street and Hillside Road; 40°47′10″N 74°41′41″W	Chester	
26	The Church in the Glen	The Church in the Glen	January 2, 2013 (#12001127)	2 Ledgewood Ave. 40°54′05″N 74°42′19″W	Netcong	Known as Stanhope United Methodist Church
27	Combs Hollow Historic District	Combs Hollow Historic District	February 16, 1996 (#96000042)	Junction of Combs Avenue and Combs Hollow Road, south of Doby Road; 40°48′40″N 74°36′35″W	Randolph	Extends into Mendham Township
28	Community of St John Baptist	Community of St John Baptist	April 24, 2007 (#07000356)	82 W. Main St. 40°46′26″N 74°36′54″W	Mendham	
29	Dr. Lewis Condict House	Dr. Lewis Condict House	April 3, 1973 (#73001125)	51 South Street; 40°47′23″N 74°28′50″W	Morristown	Headquarters of the Woman's Club of Morristown
30	Stephen Condit House	Stephen Condit House	February 15, 1974 (#74001187)	Northeast of Parsippany on Beverwyck Rd. off U.S. 46; 40°51′51″N 74°23′04″W	Parsippany	
31	Ellis Cook House	Ellis Cook House	May 12, 1975 (#75001149)	174 Mount Pleasant Ave. 40°48′06″N 74°21′52″W	East Hanover	
32	General Nathan Cooper Mansion	General Nathan Cooper Mansion	December 29, 1978 (#78001781)	West of Mendham on NJ 24; 40°46′45″N 74°40′04″W	Chester Township	
33	Nathan Cooper Gristmill	Nathan Cooper Gristmill	November 21, 1976 (#76001174)	West of Chester at Hacklebarney Road and NJ 24; 40°46′44″N 74°43′16″W	Chester Township	
34	Craft–Clausen House	Craft–Clausen House	May 1, 1992 (#92000372)	170 Fairmont Road; 40°46′06″N 74°46′07″W	Washington Township	part of the Stone Houses and Outbuildings in Washington Township MPS
35	Craftsman Farms	Craftsman Farms	April 10, 1989 (#85003730)	Junction of NJ 10 and Manor Ln. 40°51′22″N 74°28′52″W	Parsippany	Home to Gustav Stickley and other artists and artisans of the Arts and Crafts Movement in the early 20th century
36	Cutler Homestead	Cutler Homestead	March 10, 1975 (#75001152)	21 Cutler St. 40°48′28″N 74°29′04″W	Morristown	
37	Davenport–Demarest House	Davenport–Demarest House	January 17, 1992 (#91001934)	140 Changebridge Road; 40°53′38″N 74°22′00″W	Montville	part of the Dutch Stone Houses in Montville MPS
38	Decker-Kincaid Homestead	Decker-Kincaid Homestead	March 9, 2005 (#05000126)	591 Powerville Road; 40°57′26″N 74°24′38″W	Boonton Township	
39	Delaware, Lackawanna and Western Railroad Station	Delaware, Lackawanna and Western Railroad Station	March 11, 1980 (#80002514)	132 Morris St. 40°47′50″N 74°28′29″W	Morristown	1913 Renaissance Revival station in use ever since. Some scenese from Cyndi Lauper's "Time After Time" video shot here.
40	Delaware, Lackawanna and Western Railroad Station	Delaware, Lackawanna and Western Railroad Station	July 13, 1977 (#77000889)	Myrtle Ave., Main, and Division Sts. 40°54′14″N 74°24′23″W	Boonton	
41	Delaware, Lackawanna and Western Railroad Station	Delaware, Lackawanna and Western Railroad Station	May 23, 1980 (#80002511)	N. Dickerson St. 40°53′01″N 74°33′20″W	Dover	
42	James Dixon Farm	James Dixon Farm	August 29, 1977 (#77000890)	Northwest of Boonton on Rockaway Valley Road; 40°55′58″N 74°26′22″W	Boonton Township	
43	John Dods House and Tavern	John Dods House and Tavern	August 12, 1977 (#77000895)	11 Highland Street and 8 Chapel Hill Road; 40°55′04″N 74°18′07″W	Lincoln Park	
44	Henry Doremus House	Henry Doremus House	October 31, 1972 (#72000805)	490 Main Road, Towaco; 40°55′06″N 74°21′15″W	Montville	part of the Dutch Stone Houses in Montville MPS
45	Dusenberry House	Dusenberry House	November 1, 1979 (#79001515)	186 Main St; 40°44′23″N 74°22′50″W	Chatham	Mid-19th century home of local pastor
46	Fairmount Historic District	Fairmount Historic District	December 20, 1996 (#96001470)	NJ 517 from the Morris-Hunterdon County line to NJ 512 and NJ 517 from Fox Hill to Wildwood Roads, Fairmount; 40°43′08″N 74°46′30″W	Washington Township	Primarily in Tewksbury Township, Hunterdon County
47	First Congregational Church	First Congregational Church	August 10, 1977 (#77000892)	30 Hillside Road; 40°47′14″N 74°41′45″W	Chester	
48	First Presbyterian Church of Hanover	First Presbyterian Church of Hanover	November 10, 1977 (#77000896)	Mount Pleasant and Hanover Aves. 40°48′13″N 74°22′07″W	East Hanover	
49	First Reformed Church of Pompton Plains	First Reformed Church of Pompton Plains	December 12, 2012 (#12001034)	529 Newark-Pompton Turnpike; 40°57′52″N 74°17′44″W	Pompton Plains	
50	Flock-Stephens Farmstead	Flock-Stephens Farmstead	May 1, 1992 (#92000373)	244 Flocktown Rd., Washington Township; 40°49′16″N 74°46′47″W	Long Valley	part of the Stone Houses and Outbuildings in Washington Township MPS
51	Flocktown Schoolhouse	Flocktown Schoolhouse	November 30, 1982 (#82001046)	Flocktown and Naughright Roads; 40°48′57″N 74°47′13″W	Washington Township	
52	Samuel Ford, Jr.'s, Hammock Farm	Samuel Ford, Jr.'s, Hammock Farm	December 23, 1974 (#74001185)	310 Columbia Turnpike; 40°47′26″N 74°24′36″W	Florham Park	
53	Ford-Faesch House	Ford-Faesch House	February 12, 1974 (#74001184)	629 Mount Hope Road (N. of Mall); 40°55′42″N 74°32′36″W	Rockaway Township	
54	Fordville	Fordville	November 2, 1978 (#78001782)	East of Morristown at 30 Ford Hill Rd. 40°48′18″N 74°26′05″W	Morristown	
55	Fredericks House	Fredericks House	October 18, 1979 (#79003254)	6 Duchess Dr. 40°58′27″N 74°22′03″W	Kinnelon	
56	Friends Meetinghouse	Friends Meetinghouse	June 4, 1973 (#73001121)	South of Dover at Quaker Ave. and Quaker Church Rd., near NJ 10; 40°51′54″N 74°34′11″W	Dover	
57	German Valley Historic District	German Valley Historic District	July 14, 1983 (#83001606)	NJ 24, Fairmount and Fairview Roads; 40°47′05″N 74°46′48″W	Long Valley	
58	Gibbons Mansion	Gibbons Mansion	August 10, 1977 (#77000897)	36 Madison Ave. 40°45′44″N 74°25′31″W	Madison	
59	William Gibbons Stable and Farm	William Gibbons Stable and Farm	March 30, 2005 (#05000222)	Loantaka Way; 40°44′55″N 74°26′42″W	Chatham Township	
60	Glanville Blacksmith Shop	Glanville Blacksmith Shop	March 25, 1987 (#86003112)	47 Bank St. 40°47′43″N 74°29′01″W	Morristown	part of the Morristown Multiple Resource Area (MRA)
61	Glynallen	Glynallen	March 9, 1987 (#87000354)	Canfield Rd. 40°46′26″N 74°26′48″W	Morris Township	
62	Grimes Homestead	Grimes Homestead	April 1, 1977 (#77000900)	45 Bloomfield Ave. 40°52′32″N 74°26′15″W	Mountain Lakes	
63	Rev. John Hancock House, Cider Mill and Cemetery	Rev. John Hancock House, Cider Mill and Cemetery	August 30, 1984 (#84002761)	45 Ridgedale Ave. 40°46′29″N 74°24′07″W	Florham Park	
64	Hanover Village Historic District	Hanover Village Historic District	September 13, 1993 (#93000901)	Area surrounding Hanover Rd. and Mount Pleasant Ave., East Hanover Township; 40°48′00″N 74°21′59″W	East Hanover	
65	Hartley Farms	Hartley Farms	July 19, 1991 (#91000888)	Junction of Spring Valley and Blue Mill Rds., Harding Township; 40°45′16″N 74°27′38″W	Harding Township	
66	Benjamin Howell Homestead	Benjamin Howell Homestead	October 19, 1978 (#78001786)	709 S. Beverwyck Rd. 40°50′49″N 74°23′33″W	Parsippany	
67	Illumination Gas Plant of the New Jersey State Asylum for the Insane at Morris Plains	Illumination Gas Plant of the New Jersey State Asylum for the Insane at Morris Plains	June 9, 2000 (#00000653)	Old Dover Rd. 40°50′10″N 74°30′03″W	Parsippany	
68	Joseph Jackson House	Joseph Jackson House	March 4, 1975 (#75001155)	82 E. Main Street; 40°53′55″N 74°30′33″W	Rockaway	Rockaway Borough Public Library
69	Jenkins-Mead House	Jenkins-Mead House	March 10, 1997 (#97000106)	14 Revere Rd. 40°47′23″N 74°28′10″W	Morristown	
70	Peter Kemble House	Peter Kemble House	August 26, 1980 (#80002510)	Mount Kemble Avenue at Old Camp Road; 40°45′30″N 74°31′27″W	Harding Township	Relocated in 1840
71	King Store and Homestead	King Store and Homestead	April 29, 1994 (#94000393)	211 Main Street, Roxbury Township; 40°52′42″N 74°39′07″W	Ledgewood	
72	Lafayette School	Lafayette School	September 1, 2022 (#100008044)	79 Mill Road; 40°54′46″N 74°36′29″W	Roxbury Township	Known as Lower Berkshire Valley School
73	Lake Hopatcong Yacht Club	Lake Hopatcong Yacht Club	August 12, 1999 (#99000904)	N. Bertrand Rd. and Willow St. 40°55′43″N 74°38′59″W	Mount Arlington	
74	Ledgewood Historic District	Ledgewood Historic District	April 18, 2013 (#13000202)	Main and Canal Streets, Circle Drive, and Emmans and Mountain Roads; 40°52′47″N 74°39′15″W	Ledgewood	Includes King Store and Homestead, Silas Riggs House
75	Lindenwold	Lindenwold	November 13, 1986 (#86003113)	247 South Street; 40°47′40″N 74°29′04″W	Morristown	part of the Morristown MRA, on the campus of the Peck School
76	Little Red Schoolhouse	Little Red Schoolhouse	June 6, 1986 (#73001122)	203 Ridgedale Avenue; 40°47′17″N 74°23′26″W	Florham Park	
77	Effingham Low House	Effingham Low House	January 17, 1992 (#91001930)	102 Hook Mountain Road, Pine Brook; 40°52′37″N 74°20′18″W	Montville	part of the Dutch Stone Houses in Montville MPS
78	Madison Civic Commercial District	Madison Civic Commercial District	October 18, 1991 (#89002115)	Roughly Main St., Waverly Pl., Lincoln Pl., Prospect St., Kings Rd., Green Ave., Wilmer St., and Green Village Rd. 40°45′29″N 74°25′00″W	Madison	Downtown core of Madison from late 19th century
79	Madison Masonic Lodge	Madison Masonic Lodge	January 17, 2008 (#07001405)	170 Main St. 40°45′25″N 74°24′31″W	Madison	
80	Madison Public Library and the James Building	Madison Public Library and the James Building	February 8, 1980 (#80002512)	Main St. and Green Village Rd. 40°45′35″N 74°25′03″W	Madison	
81	Madison Station	Madison Station	June 22, 1984 (#84002764)	Kings Rd. 40°45′25″N 74°24′58″W	Madison	1916 stone Gothic Revival building; part of the Operating Passenger Railroad Stations TR
82	Mendham Historic District	Mendham Historic District	April 18, 1985 (#85000865)	Roughly bounded by Halstead St. and Country Ln. on W. and E. Main St., Mountain Ave., Hilltop Rd. and Prospect St.; also E. & W. Main Sts., Peacock Ln., Hampton St., Hilltop & Talmage Rds. 40°46′33″N 74°36′03″W	Mendham	second address listing represents a boundary increase 11/19/14.
83	Merchiston Farm	Merchiston Farm	November 13, 1989 (#89001946)	170 Longview Road; 40°43′53″N 74°42′26″W	Chester Township	Home to landscape architect Martha Brookes Hutcheson, now the Bamboo Brook Outdoor Education Center
84	Methodist Episcopal Church	Methodist Episcopal Church	May 2, 2008 (#08000364)	24 Madison Ave. 40°45′48″N 74°25′22″W	Madison	
85	Methodist Episcopal Church of Hibernia	Methodist Episcopal Church of Hibernia	July 14, 2011 (#11000448)	419 Green Pond Road; 40°56′44″N 74°29′40″W	Hibernia	
86	Middle Valley Historic District	Middle Valley Historic District	September 25, 1990 (#89002353)	Along West Mill Road and Middle Valley Road south of Beacon Road; 40°45′30″N 74°49′15″W	Middle Valley	
87	Miller-Rinehard Farmstead	Miller-Rinehard Farmstead	February 1, 2006 (#05001569)	72 Hacklebarney Rd. 40°45′18″N 74°44′40″W	Washington Township	
88	Miller-Kingsland House	Miller-Kingsland House	July 24, 1973 (#73001120)	Vreeland Ave., 900 feet (270 m) west of Montville Township boundary 40°54′02″N 74°23′13″W	Boonton	
89	Millington Schoolhouse	Millington Schoolhouse	March 12, 2012 (#12000109)	1802 Long Hill Rd. (Long Hill Township); 40°40′38″N 74°31′05″W	Millington	
90	Millington Station	Millington Station	June 22, 1984 (#84002767)	Long Hill Rd. 40°40′24″N 74°31′26″W	Millington	part of the Operating Passenger Railroad Stations TR
91	Timothy Mills House	Timothy Mills House	February 24, 1975 (#75001153)	27 Mills Street; 40°48′05″N 74°29′24″W	Morristown	
92	Montville Schoolhouse	Montville Schoolhouse	December 11, 2009 (#09001075)	6 Taylortown Rd. 40°54′57″N 74°23′03″W	Montville	
93	Morris Canal	Morris Canal	October 1, 1974 (#74002228)	Irregular line beginning at Phillipsburg and ending at Jersey City; 40°41′08″N 75°09′49″W	Not Applicable	
94	Morris County Courthouse	Morris County Courthouse	August 19, 1977 (#77000898)	Washington Street between Court Street and Western Avenue; 40°47′51″N 74°29′05″W	Morristown	
95	Morris Plains Station	Morris Plains Station	June 22, 1984 (#84002780)	Speedwell Ave. 40°49′42″N 74°28′44″W	Morris Plains	part of the Operating Passenger Railroad Stations TR
96	Morristown and Erie Railroad Whippany Water Tank	Morristown and Erie Railroad Whippany Water Tank	September 6, 2006 (#06000762)	1 RR Plaza, NJ 10 W and Whippany Rd. 40°49′31″N 74°24′46″W	Hanover Township	
97	Morristown District	Morristown District	October 30, 1973 (#73001126)	Roughly bounded by the cemetery, King Pl., Madison and Colles Aves., DeHart St., and N. Park Pl.; Morristown Historic District boundary increase: Irregularly bounded by Lackawanna, Franklin Pl., James, Ogden Pl., Doughty, Mt. Kemble, Western, and Speedwell; 40°47′38″N 74°28′51″W	Morristown	part of the Morristown MRA, includes the Dr. Lewis Condict House, Morris County Courthouse, Morristown station, and Thomas Nast Home
98	Morristown National Historical Park	Morristown National Historical Park	October 15, 1966 (#66000053)	At junction of U.S. 202 and NJ 24; 40°47′47″N 74°28′00″W	Morristown	Includes the Ford Mansion, Fort Nonsense, Jockey Hollow and New Jersey Brigade Encampment Site
99	Morristown School	Morristown School	February 28, 1996 (#96000047)	East of Morristown at junction of Whippany Road and Hanover Avenue; 40°48′13″N 74°26′58″W	Morris Township	
100	Mott Hollow	Mott Hollow	August 31, 1992 (#92001085)	Roughly, Gristmill Rd. from Millbrook Ave. to Zandep Ln. and adjacent area along Millbrook, Randolph Township; 40°51′43″N 74°33′07″W	Randolph	
101	Mount Arlington Historic District	Mount Arlington Historic District	August 26, 1983 (#83001607)	Howard Blvd., Edgemere and Windemere Aves. 40°55′56″N 74°37′58″W	Mount Arlington	
102	Mount Freedom Presbyterian Church	Mount Freedom Presbyterian Church	October 11, 1991 (#91001484)	Junction of Sussex Turnpike and Church Rd., Randolph Township; 40°49′38″N 74°34′56″W	Mount Freedom	
103	Mount Hope Miners' Church	Mount Hope Miners' Church	August 20, 2012 (#12000530)	Mount Hope Road; 40°55′42″N 74°32′39″W	Mount Hope	
104	Mount Kemble Home	Mount Kemble Home	November 13, 1986 (#86003115)	1 Mt. Kemble Ave. 40°47′40″N 74°29′04″W	Morristown	part of the Morristown MRA
105	Mount Olive Village Historic District	Mount Olive Village Historic District	August 3, 2015 (#15000490)	Mount Olive Road and Flanders-Drakestown Road; 40°51′04″N 74°44′00″W	Mount Olive Township	
106	Mount Tabor Historic District	Mount Tabor Historic District	March 3, 2015 (#15000051)	Roughly bounded by Tabor & Dickerson Rds., Simpson & Ridgewood Aves. & Mount Tabor Golf Course; 40°52′21″N 74°28′42″W	Parsippany-Troy Hills	
107	Mount Vernon School	Mount Vernon School	July 7, 2022 (#100007872)	24 Southern Boulevard; 40°43′19″N 74°24′13″W	Chatham Township	Known as Chatham Red Brick Schoolhouse
108	Mountain Lakes Historic District	Mountain Lakes Historic District	September 7, 2005 (#05000963)	Roughly bounded by Pocono Rd., Denville Township line, Fanny Rd., and RR Tracks; 40°53′41″N 74°26′22″W	Mountain Lakes	
109	Thomas Nast Home	Thomas Nast Home	October 15, 1966 (#66000470)	MacCulloch Avenue and Miller Road; 40°47′30″N 74°28′52″W	Morristown	Home of influential political cartoonist Thomas Nast for much of his career
110	Jacob Wise Neighbor House	Jacob Wise Neighbor House	February 22, 1991 (#91000111)	143 West Mill Road; 40°46′42″N 74°47′26″W	Washington Township	
111	Leonard Neighbor Farmstead	Leonard Neighbor Farmstead	May 1, 1992 (#92000374)	177 West Mill Road; 40°46′24″N 74°47′37″W	Washington Township	part of the Stone Houses and Outbuildings in Washington Township MPS
112	New Vernon Historic District	New Vernon Historic District	July 8, 1982 (#82003288)	Lee's Hill, Village, Mill Brook and Glen Alpin Roads; 40°44′36″N 74°29′57″W	Harding Township	
113	New York Susquehanna & Western Railroad Station	New York Susquehanna & Western Railroad Station	January 24, 2002 (#01001492)	Main St. 41°00′14″N 74°20′33″W	Butler	
114	Normandy Park Historic District	Normandy Park Historic District	December 6, 1996 (#96001469)	Normandy Parkway, between Columbia Turnpike and Madison Avenue; 40°47′31″N 74°27′10″W	Morris Township	
115	Oak Dell	Oak Dell	November 13, 1986 (#86003114)	Franklin St. and Madison Ave. 40°47′20″N 74°27′37″W	Morristown	part of the Morristown MRA
116	Orchard Street Cemetery Gatehouse	Orchard Street Cemetery Gatehouse	September 9, 2026 (#100013410)	Intersection of Orchard Street and Chestnut Street; 40°52′54″N 74°33′39″W	Dover	
117	Our Lady of Mercy Chapel	Our Lady of Mercy Chapel	September 18, 1978 (#78001785)	100 Whippany Rd. 40°49′11″N 74°25′01″W	Whippany	
118	Palace Theatre	Palace Theatre	May 24, 1996 (#96000536)	7 Ledgewood Ave. 40°54′02″N 74°42′17″W	Netcong	
119	Johannes Parlaman House	Johannes Parlaman House	January 17, 1992 (#91001933)	15 Vreeland Avenue; 40°54′03″N 74°22′50″W	Montville	part of the Dutch Stone Houses in Montville MPS
120	Parsonage of the Montville Reformed Dutch Church	Parsonage of the Montville Reformed Dutch Church	January 17, 1992 (#91001931)	107 Changebridge Rd. 40°54′00″N 74°21′54″W	Montville	part of the Dutch Stone Houses in Montville MPS
121	Pompton Plains Railroad Station	Pompton Plains Railroad Station	March 5, 2008 (#08000136)	33 Evans Place; 40°58′14″N 74°17′36″W	Pequannock	
122	Pottersville Village Historic District	Pottersville Village Historic District	September 18, 1990 (#90001475)	Properties fronting on Black River, Pottersville, McCann Mill and Hacklebarney Roads, Fairmount Road East and High Street; 40°42′52″N 74°43′15″W	Pottersville	Extends into Hunterdon and Somerset Counties
123	Pruddentown Historic District	Pruddentown Historic District	February 12, 2003 (#03000011)	Mount Kemble Ave. 40°46′47″N 74°29′56″W	Morris Township	
124	Ralston Historic District	Ralston Historic District	February 20, 1975 (#75001150)	1 mile (1.6 km) west of Mendham at NJ 24 and Roxiticus Road; Boundary increase (listed February 22, 1999, refnum 99000085): NJ 24 and Roxiticus Rd. 40°46′16″N 74°37′31″W	Mendham Township	
125	Rarick-Kellihan House	Rarick-Kellihan House	May 1, 1992 (#92000375)	358 Fairview Ave., Washington Township; 40°48′56″N 74°45′08″W	Long Valley	part of the Stone Houses and Outbuildings in Washington Township MPS
126	Joseph W. Revere House	Joseph W. Revere House	September 20, 1973 (#73001127)	Junction of Mendham and Kahdena Roads • Fosterfields boundary increase (listed October 9, 1991, refnum 91000478); 40°48′06″N 74°30′16″W	Morris Township	Known as Fosterfields
127	Silas Riggs House	Silas Riggs House	November 11, 1977 (#77000894)	213 Main Street; 40°52′44″N 74°39′08″W	Ledgewood	
128	Alfred T. Ringling Manor	Alfred T. Ringling Manor	June 3, 1976 (#76001177)	South of Oak Ridge on Berkshire Valley Rd. 41°00′33″N 74°31′00″W	Oak Ridge	
129	Rockaway Valley Methodist Church	Rockaway Valley Methodist Church	November 11, 1977 (#77000891)	Valley Road, northwest of Boonton; 40°55′42″N 74°26′12″W	Boonton Township	
130	St. Mary's Church Historic District	St. Mary's Church Historic District	April 3, 2023 (#100008766)	South Main Street bounded by US 46 and St. Mary's Street; 40°53′13″N 74°34′47″W	Wharton	St. Mary's Church serves Wharton, Dover, and Mine Hill Township
131	Sayre House	Sayre House	February 12, 1980 (#80002513)	31 Ridgedale Ave. 40°45′44″N 74°24′58″W	Madison	
132	Schooley's Mountain Historic District	Schooley's Mountain Historic District	June 14, 1991 (#91000677)	Schooley's Mountain, Pleasant Grove, and Flocktown Roads, and Heath Lane, Schooley's Mountain; 40°48′07″N 74°48′53″W	Washington Township	
133	Seward House	Seward House	December 24, 2013 (#13000977)	30 Flanders Road (Turkey Brook Park); 40°52′00″N 74°43′33″W	Mount Olive Township	Known as Seward Mansion
134	Sharpenstine Farmstead	Sharpenstine Farmstead	May 1, 1992 (#92000376)	98 East Mill Road; 40°47′11″N 74°45′50″W	Washington Township	part of the Stone Houses and Outbuildings in Washington Township MPS
135	Silver Lake Historic District	Silver Lake Historic District	March 5, 1999 (#99000270)	Roughly along Blue Mill Rd., Dickson's Mill Rd., Beuren Rd., Red Gate Rd., and James St. 40°45′08″N 74°28′22″W	Harding Township	
136	Slater's Mill	Slater's Mill	June 18, 1975 (#75001154)	96 Paterson-Hamburg Turnpike; 40°59′55″N 74°18′22″W	Riverdale	No longer extant.
137	Bridget Smith House	Bridget Smith House	February 27, 1998 (#98000099)	124 Randolph Ave. 40°52′25″N 74°35′49″W	Mine Hill Township	
138	John Smith House	John Smith House	January 1, 1976 (#76001176)	124 Washington Valley Road; 40°48′20″N 74°31′37″W	Washington Valley	
139	Speedwell Village-The Factory	Speedwell Village-The Factory	September 13, 1974 (#74001186)	333 Speedwell Ave. 40°47′50″N 74°28′51″W	Morristown	
140	Split Rock Furnace	Split Rock Furnace	November 6, 1974 (#74001182)	Northwest of Boonton; 40°57′33″N 74°27′43″W	Rockaway Township	
141	Spring Brook House	Spring Brook House	November 13, 1986 (#86003111)	161 James Street; 40°46′56″N 74°28′59″W	Morristown	part of the Morristown MRA
142	Stephens Homestead	Stephens Homestead	January 14, 2013 (#12001178)	800 Willow Grove Road, Stephens State Park; 40°52′19″N 74°48′24″W	Mount Olive Township	
143	Tempe Wick Road–Washington Corners Historic District	Tempe Wick Road–Washington Corners Historic District	August 25, 2000 (#00000959)	Corey Lane, Cemetery, Tempe Wick, Kennaday, Leddell, and Jockey Hollow Roads; 40°45′56″N 74°33′30″W	Harding Township, Mendham Township	Includes the Peter Kemble House
144	David Thompson House	David Thompson House	July 24, 1973 (#73001123)	56 W. Main St. 40°46′26″N 74°36′45″W	Mendham	
145	Thorne and Eddy Estates	Thorne and Eddy Estates	December 14, 1978 (#78001783)	East of Morristown on Normandy Heights Road; 40°47′42″N 74°26′40″W	Morris Township	
146	Trimmer-Dufford Farmstead	Trimmer-Dufford Farmstead	May 1, 1992 (#92000377)	186 W. Mill Rd., Washington Township; 40°46′24″N 74°47′48″W	Long Valley	part of the Stone Houses and Outbuildings in Washington Township MPS
147	Tuttle House	Tuttle House	October 5, 1977 (#77000901)	341 NJ 10; 40°49′12″N 74°24′26″W	Whippany	
148	David Tuttle Cooperage	David Tuttle Cooperage	June 19, 1979 (#79001516)	83 Gristmill Rd. 40°51′35″N 74°33′21″W	Dover	
149	United States Army Steam Locomotive No. 4039	United States Army Steam Locomotive No. 4039	March 4, 2002 (#02000108)	1 Railroad Plaza, 10 West and Whippany Rd. 40°49′23″N 74°24′41″W	Hanover Township	
150	James Van Duyne Farmhouse	James Van Duyne Farmhouse	April 15, 1982 (#82003289)	32 Waughaw Road, Towaco; 40°55′32″N 74°20′54″W	Montville	
151	Martin Van Duyne House	Martin Van Duyne House	January 17, 1992 (#91001935)	292 Main Road; 40°54′59″N 74°22′15″W	Montville	part of the Dutch Stone Houses in Montville MPS
152	Simon Van Duyne House	Simon Van Duyne House	January 17, 1992 (#91001932)	58 Maple Avenue, Pine Brook; 40°51′55″N 74°20′22″W	Montville	part of the Dutch Stone Houses in Montville MPS
153	Van Duyne–Jacobus House	Van Duyne–Jacobus House	January 17, 1992 (#91001929)	29 Changebridge Road; 40°54′39″N 74°21′50″W	Montville	part of the Dutch Stone Houses in Montville MPS
154	Vanness – Linen House	Vanness – Linen House	July 14, 2011 (#11000449)	211 Hamburg Turnpike; 41°00′03″N 74°18′54″W	Riverdale	
155	Nicholas Vreeland Outkitchen	Nicholas Vreeland Outkitchen	December 11, 2009 (#09001076)	52 Jacksonville Road, Towaco; 40°55′59″N 74°20′33″W	Montville	
156	Washington Valley Historic District	Washington Valley Historic District	November 12, 1992 (#92001583)	Roughly bounded by Schoolhouse Lane, Gaston Road, Sussex Avenue, Kahdena Road, Mendham Avenue, Tingley and Washington Valley Roads; 40°48′00″N 74°31′48″W	Morris Township, Mendham Township	Includes Joseph W. Revere House, John Smith House, and Washington Valley Schoolhouse
157	Washington Valley Schoolhouse	Washington Valley Schoolhouse	October 15, 1973 (#73001130)	Washington Valley Road and Schoolhouse Lane; 40°48′22″N 74°31′52″W	Washington Valley	
158	Whippany Burying Yard	Whippany Burying Yard	December 11, 2009 (#09001077)	New Jersey Route 10; 40°49′09″N 74°24′22″W	Hanover	
159	Whippany Farm	Whippany Farm	September 22, 1977 (#77000899)	53 E. Hanover Ave. 40°48′05″N 74°27′10″W	Morristown	
160	Willow Hall	Willow Hall	January 18, 2011 (#10001146)	330 Speedwell Avenue; 40°48′51″N 74°29′00″W	Morristown	
