= Whippany Burying Yard =

Historic place in Morris County, New Jersey

- U.S. National Register of Historic Places
- New Jersey Register of Historic Places
- Location within Morris County, New Jersey
- Location: Morris County, New Jersey
- Coordinates: 40°48′13″N 74°22′5″W
- Built: 1718
- NRHP reference No.: 09001077
- NJRHP No.: 4303

Significant dates
- Added to NRHP: December 11, 2009
- Designated NJRHP: September 28, 2009

The Whippany Burying Yard, in the Whippany section of Hanover Township, Morris County, New Jersey, United States, is a cemetery that was added to the National Register of Historic Places on December 11, 2009.

The two plus acre burying yard, which has approximately 450 graves and which dates back to 1718, is the oldest cemetery in northwest New Jersey. Graves include those of veterans of the French and Indian War, the American Revolution, the Civil War, and World War I.

== See also ==
- National Register of Historic Places listings in Morris County, New Jersey
