= Mount Kemble Home =

- U.S. National Register of Historic Places
- New Jersey Register of Historic Places
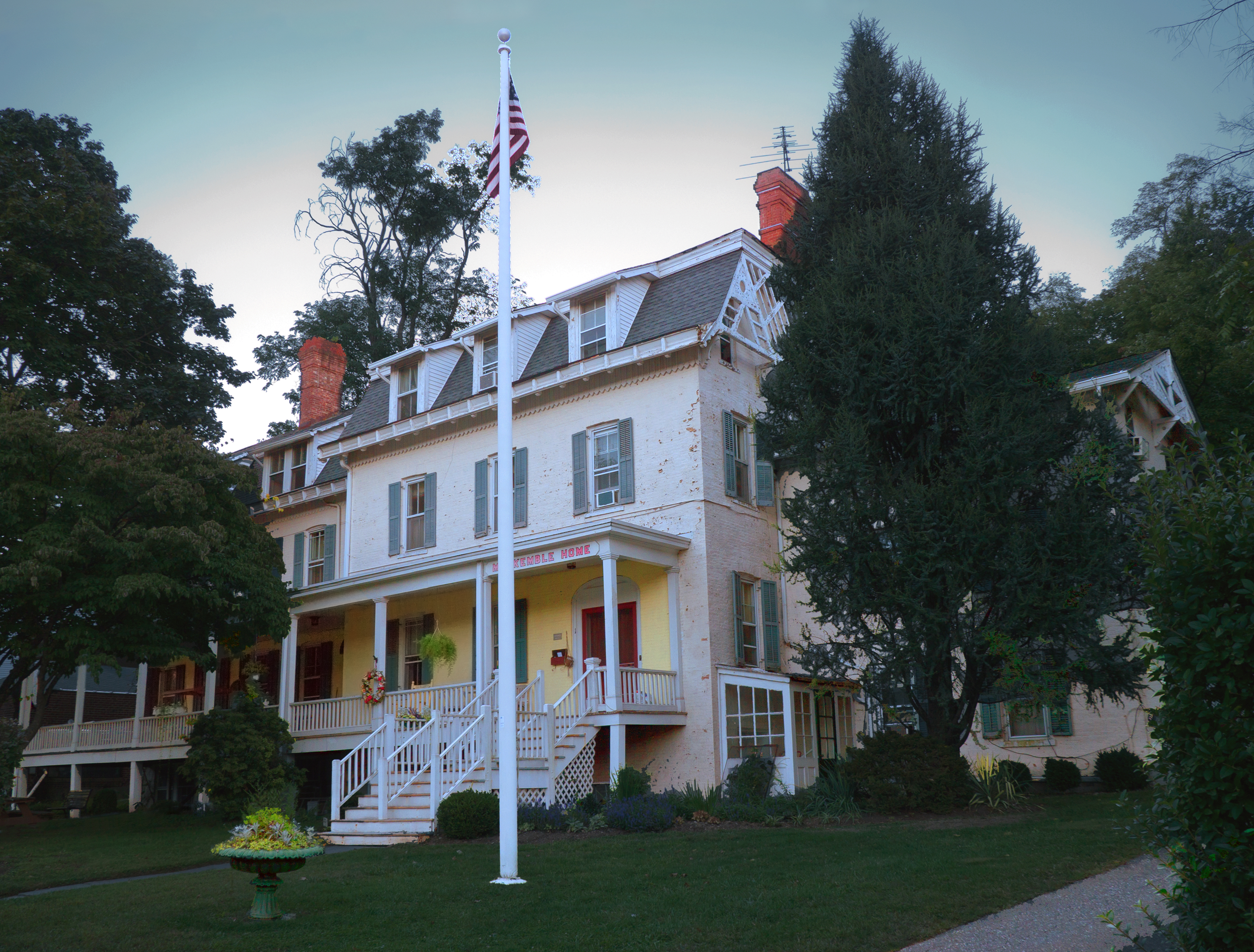

- Location within Morris County, New Jersey Location within New Jersey Location within the United States
- Location: 1 Mount Kemble Avenue; Morristown, New Jersey
- Coordinates: 40°47′40″N 74°29′04″W
- Built: c. 1826
- Architectural style: Colonial Revival, Gothic Revival, Federal
- MPS: Morristown Multiple Resource Area
- NRHP reference No.: 86003115
- NJRHP No.: 2194

Significant dates
- Added to NRHP: November 13, 1986
- Designated NJRHP: September 11, 1986

The Mount Kemble Home is a historic building located at 1 Mount Kemble Avenue in the town of Morristown in Morris County, New Jersey. Part of the Morristown Multiple Resource Area (MRA), it was added to the National Register of Historic Places on November 13, 1986, for its significance in architecture.

== History and description ==
The main section and north wing of the building were built c. 1826. It was remodeled c. 1880 and a south wing added in 1905. The two and one-half story building features several architectural styles, described in the nomination form as vernacular Federal with Carpenter Gothic/Stick and Colonial Revival embellishment.

In 1878, Charles E. Noble purchased the property and remodeled it. In 1890, he sold it to a group of seven women from the Morristown Presbyterian Church, for use as a Home for Worthy and Destitute Women. In 1905, Alfred R. Whitney financed the south wing expansion and the building was renamed the Old Ladies Home. In 1940, the name was changed to the current one, Mount Kemble Home.

== See also ==
- National Register of Historic Places listings in Morris County, New Jersey
