= Sharpenstine Farmstead =

Historic house in New Jersey, United States

- U.S. National Register of Historic Places
- New Jersey Register of Historic Places
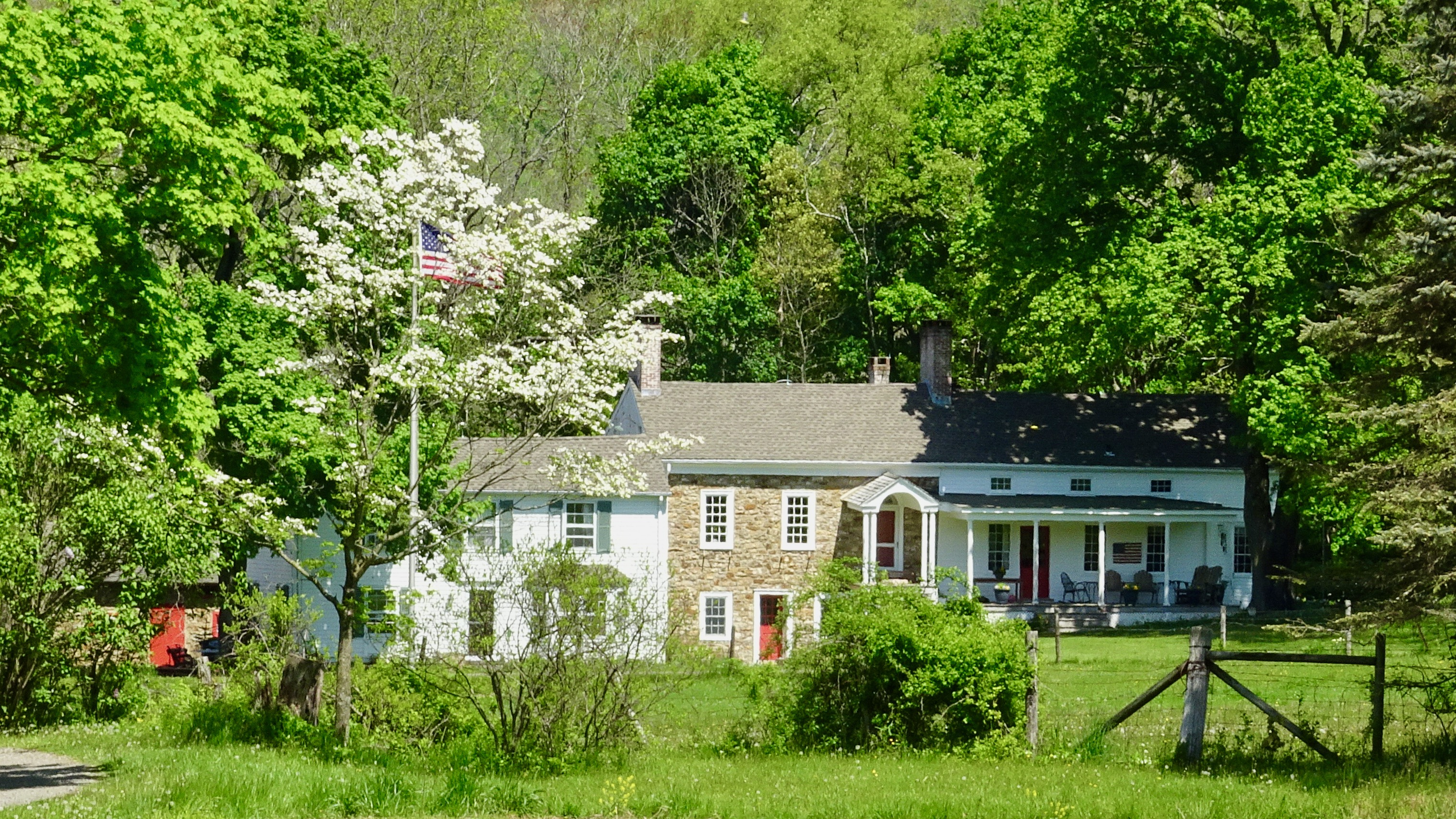
- Sharpenstine Farmstead in 2021

- Location within Morris County, New Jersey Location within New Jersey Location within the United States
- Location: 98 East Mill Road, Washington Township, New Jersey
- Nearest city: Long Valley, New Jersey
- Coordinates: 40°47′11″N 74°45′50″W
- Area: 22.4 acres (9.1 ha)
- Architectural style: Federal
- MPS: Stone Houses and Outbuildings in Washington Township
- NRHP reference No.: 92000376
- NJRHP No.: 2266

Significant dates
- Added to NRHP: May 1, 1992
- Designated NJRHP: March 9, 1992

The Sharpenstine Farmstead is a historic farmhouse located at 98 East Mill Road near Long Valley in Washington Township, Morris County, New Jersey. It was added to the National Register of Historic Places on May 1, 1992, for its significance in architecture. The 22.4-acre (9.1 ha) farm overlooks the valley formed by the South Branch Raritan River. The house is part of the Stone Houses and Outbuildings in Washington Township Multiple Property Submission (MPS).

== History ==
In 1749, the property was bought by John Peter Sharpenstine (1746–1826). In 1826, it was inherited by his son David Sharp (1786–1864).

== Description ==
The central part of the farmhouse is a stone building with a gable roof and Federal style. The property has six contributing buildings, including the main house, a stone barn with a gambrel roof and a wagon house.

== Gallery ==
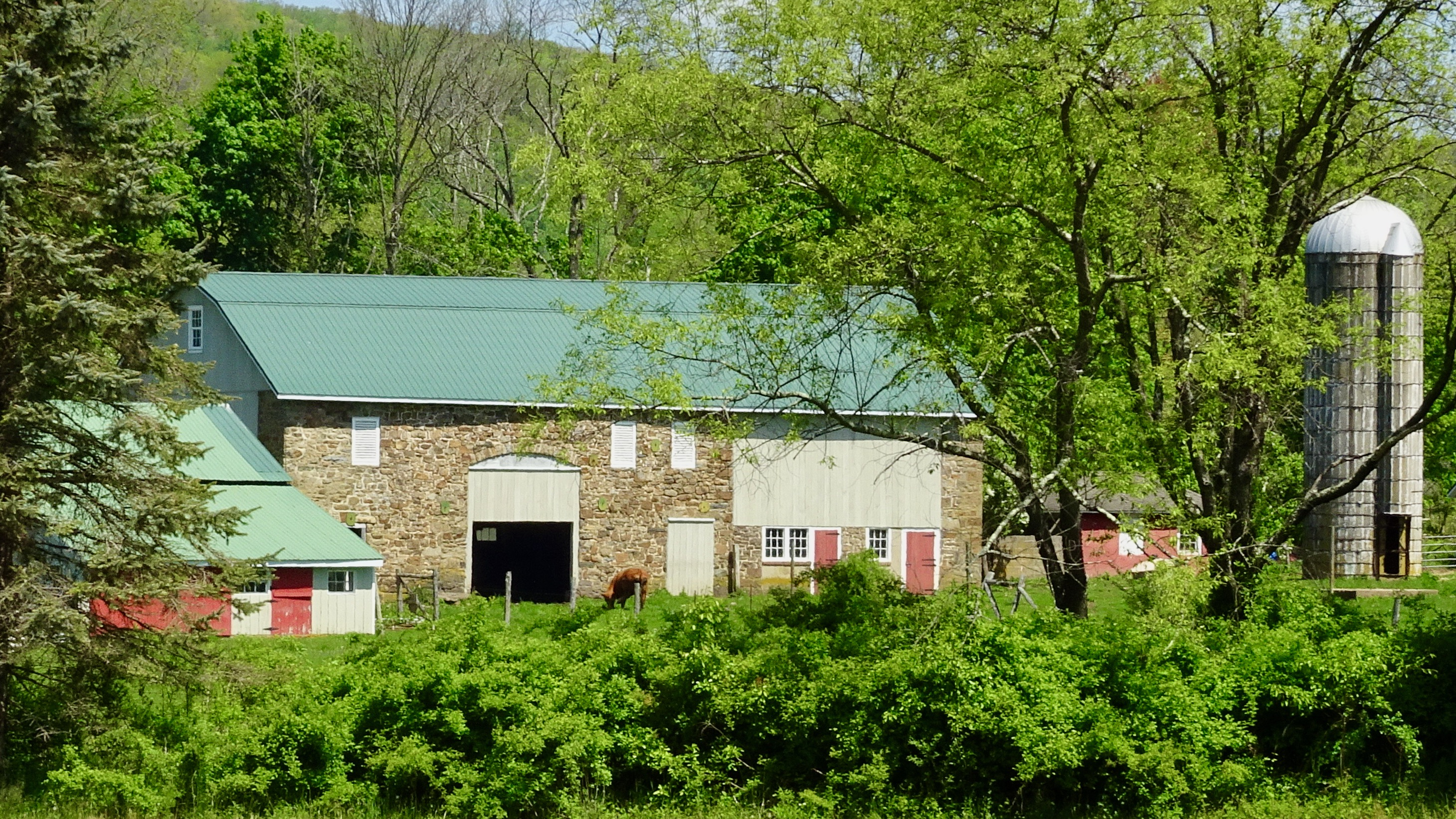
Stone barn and other outbuildings

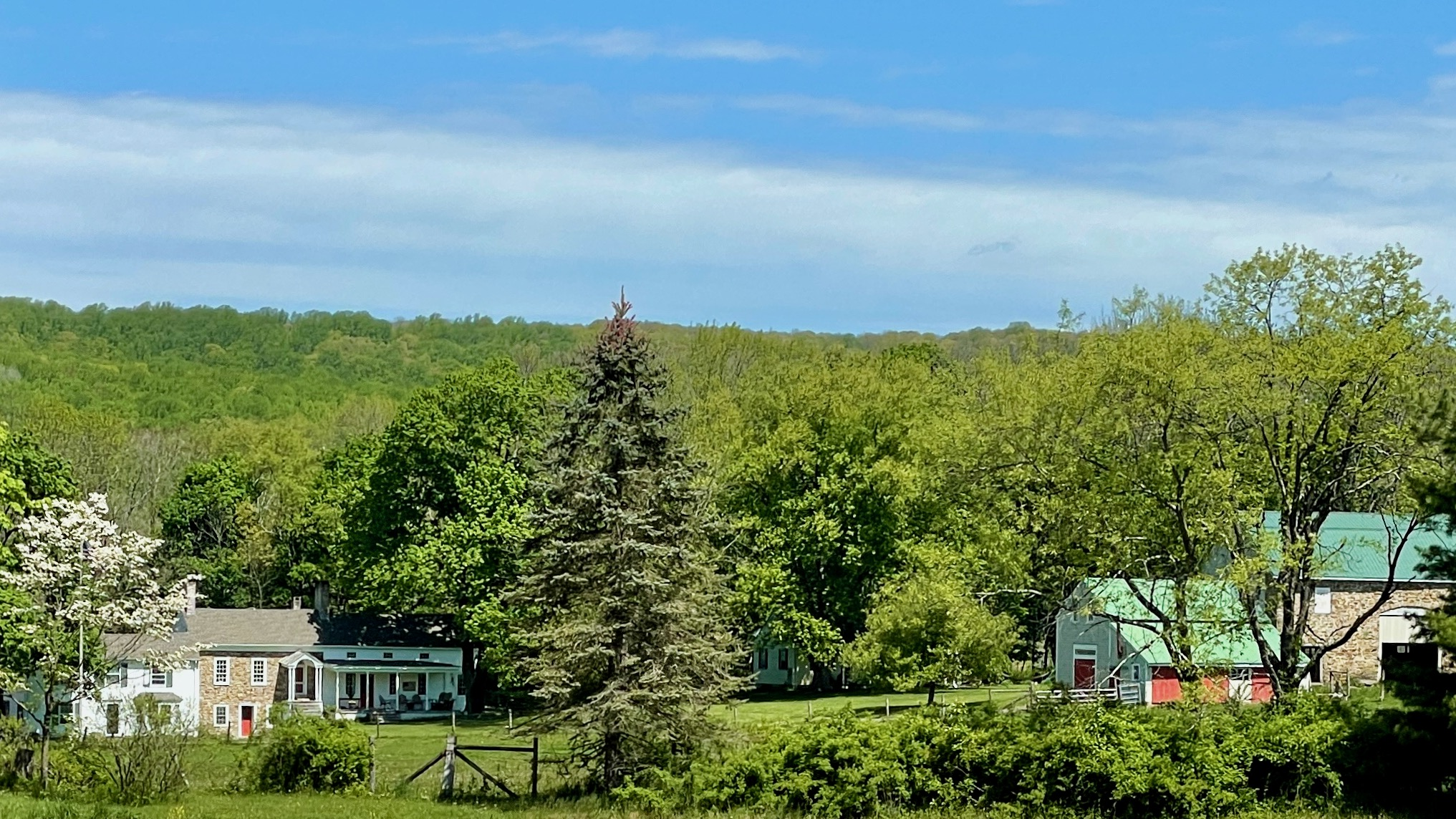
Area view of farmstead

== See also ==
- National Register of Historic Places listings in Morris County, New Jersey
- German Valley Historic District
