= Spring Brook House =

- U.S. National Register of Historic Places
- New Jersey Register of Historic Places
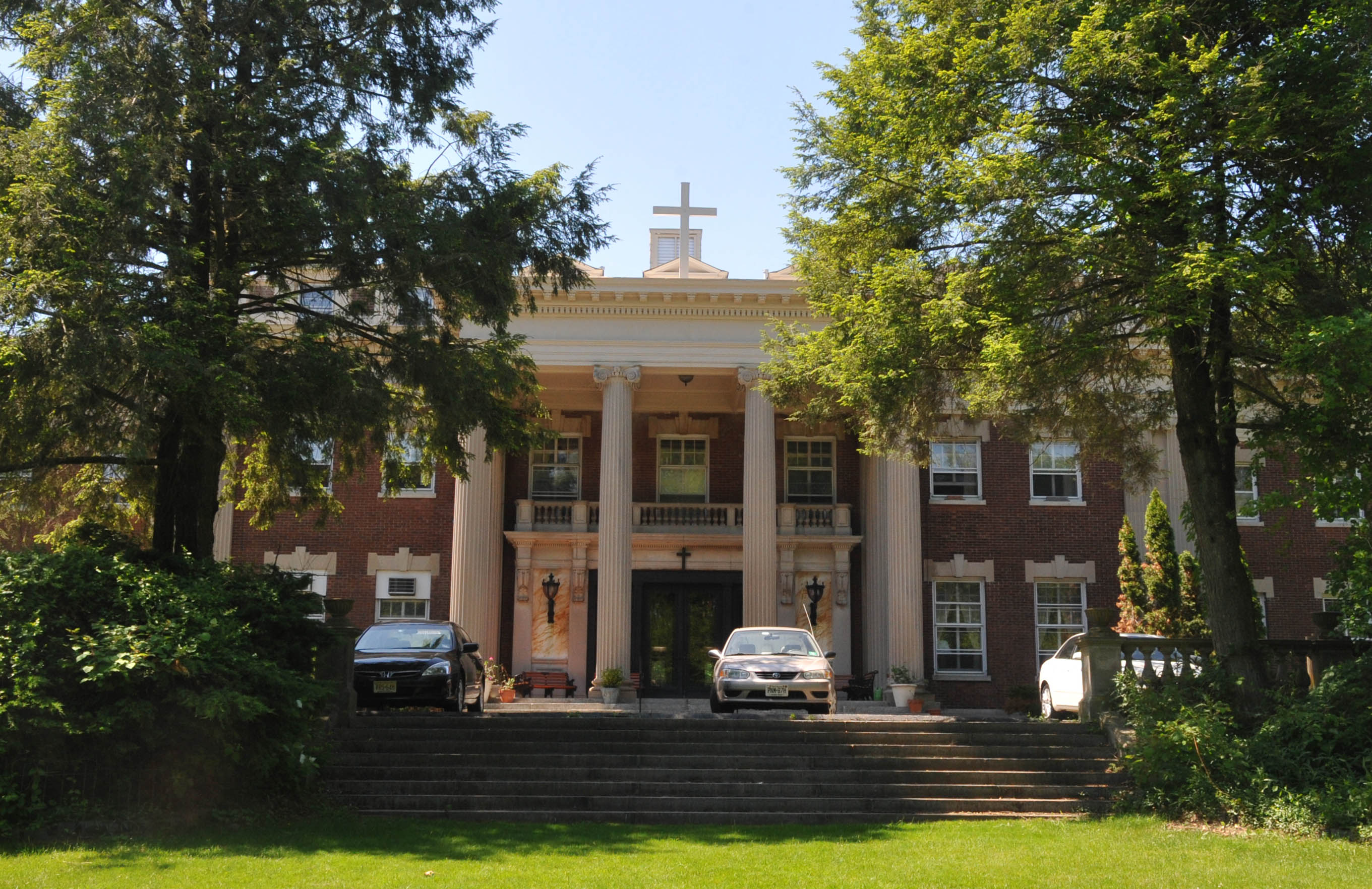

- Location within Morris County, New Jersey Location within New Jersey Location within the United States
- Location: 161 James Street; Morristown, New Jersey
- Coordinates: 40°46′56″N 74°28′59″W
- Built: 1904–1906
- Architect: George A. Freeman; Francis George Hasselman
- Architectural style: Colonial Revival, Georgian Revival
- MPS: Morristown Multiple Resource Area
- NRHP reference No.: 86003111
- NJRHP No.: 2199

Significant dates
- Added to NRHP: November 13, 1986
- Designated NJRHP: September 11, 1986

The Spring Brook House is a historic brick building located at 161 James Street in the town of Morristown in Morris County, New Jersey. Part of the Morristown Multiple Resource Area (MRA), it was added to the National Register of Historic Places on November 13, 1986, for its significance in architecture and commerce. The house is currently a retreat, the Loyola Jesuit Center in Morristown.

== History and description ==
In 1865, John T. Foote (1818–1902), businessman from Cincinnati, moved to Morristown. His son Robert D. Foote (1863–1924) inherited the property, Spring Brook Farms, and built Spring Brook House between 1904 and 1906. The two and one-half story house was designed by architects George A. Freeman and Francis George Hasselman and features Georgian Revival style. In 1921, Foote sold 160 acres (65 ha), which became the Spring Brook Country Club. In 1927, the Diocese (now Archdiocese) of Newark approved the acquisition of the historic property by Rev. Herman Storck SJ, a Jesuit priest, who engineered its purchase from the Foote estate by benefactor Welcome W. Bender. Bender "donated the property to the Jesuits by handing the deed to his 12-year-old son, who in turn presented it with a formal bow to Father Storck."

== See also ==
- National Register of Historic Places listings in Morris County, New Jersey
