= James Dixon Farm =

Coordinates: 40.93311°N 74.43784°W

- U.S. National Register of Historic Places
- New Jersey Register of Historic Places
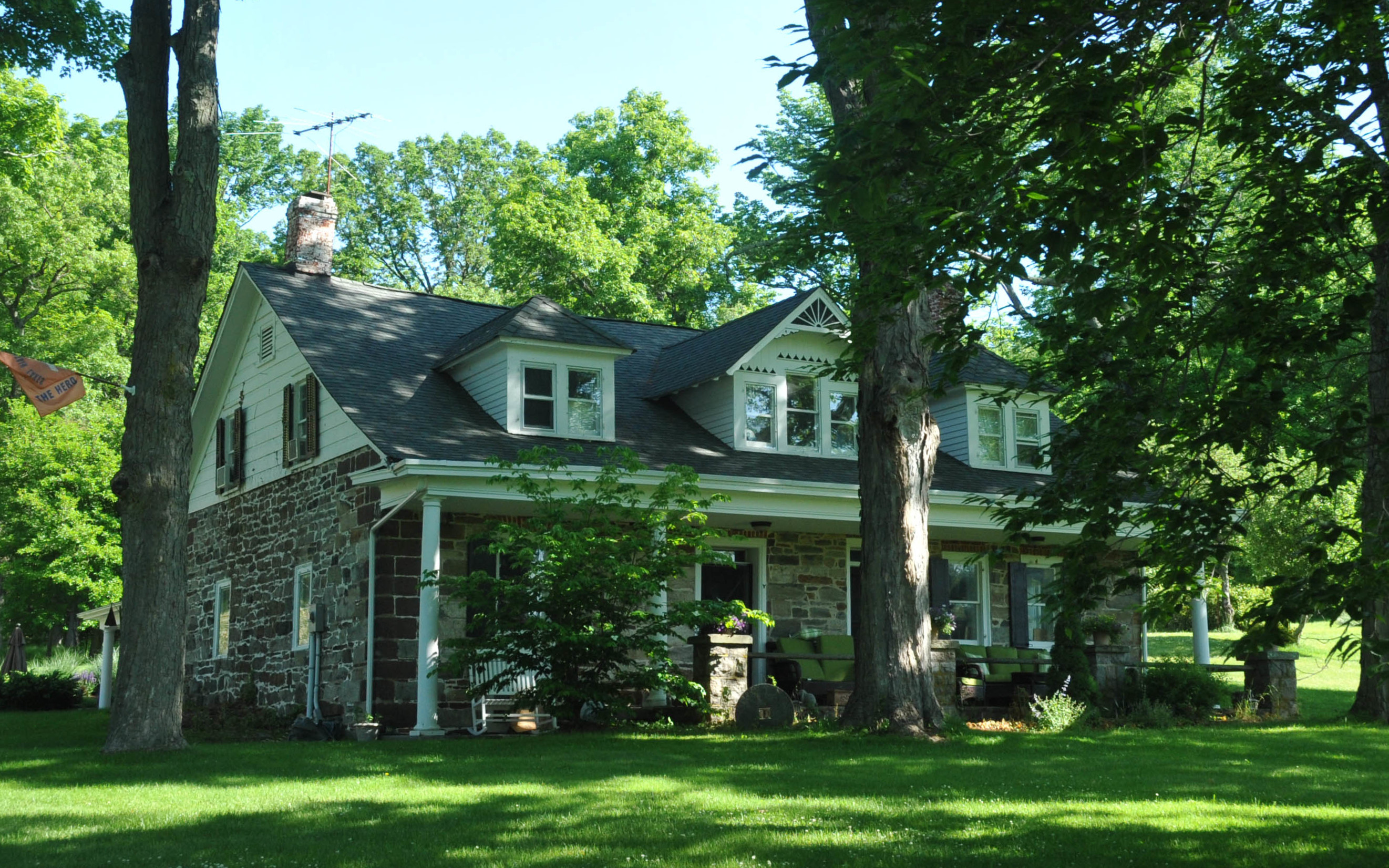

- Location within Morris County, New Jersey Location within New Jersey Location within the United States
- Location: Rockaway Valley Road, northeast of Valley Road; Boonton Township, New Jersey
- Nearest city: Boonton, New Jersey
- Area: 12 acres (4.9 ha)
- Built: 1760
- NRHP reference No.: 77000890
- NJRHP No.: 2090

Significant dates
- Added to NRHP: August 29, 1977
- Designated NJRHP: October 3, 1980

The James Dixon Farm is a historic house located northwest of Boonton on Rockaway Valley Road, northeast of Valley Road, in Boonton Township of Morris County, New Jersey. It was built in 1760. It has also been known as the Aaron Miller House and as the Dixon Property. It was listed on the National Register of Historic Places in 1977. The listing included six contributing buildings including a single dwelling and one or more animal facilities on 12 acres (4.9 ha).

== See also ==
- National Register of Historic Places listings in Morris County, New Jersey
