= Parsonage of the Montville Reformed Dutch Church =

Historic church in New Jersey, United States

- U.S. National Register of Historic Places
- New Jersey Register of Historic Places
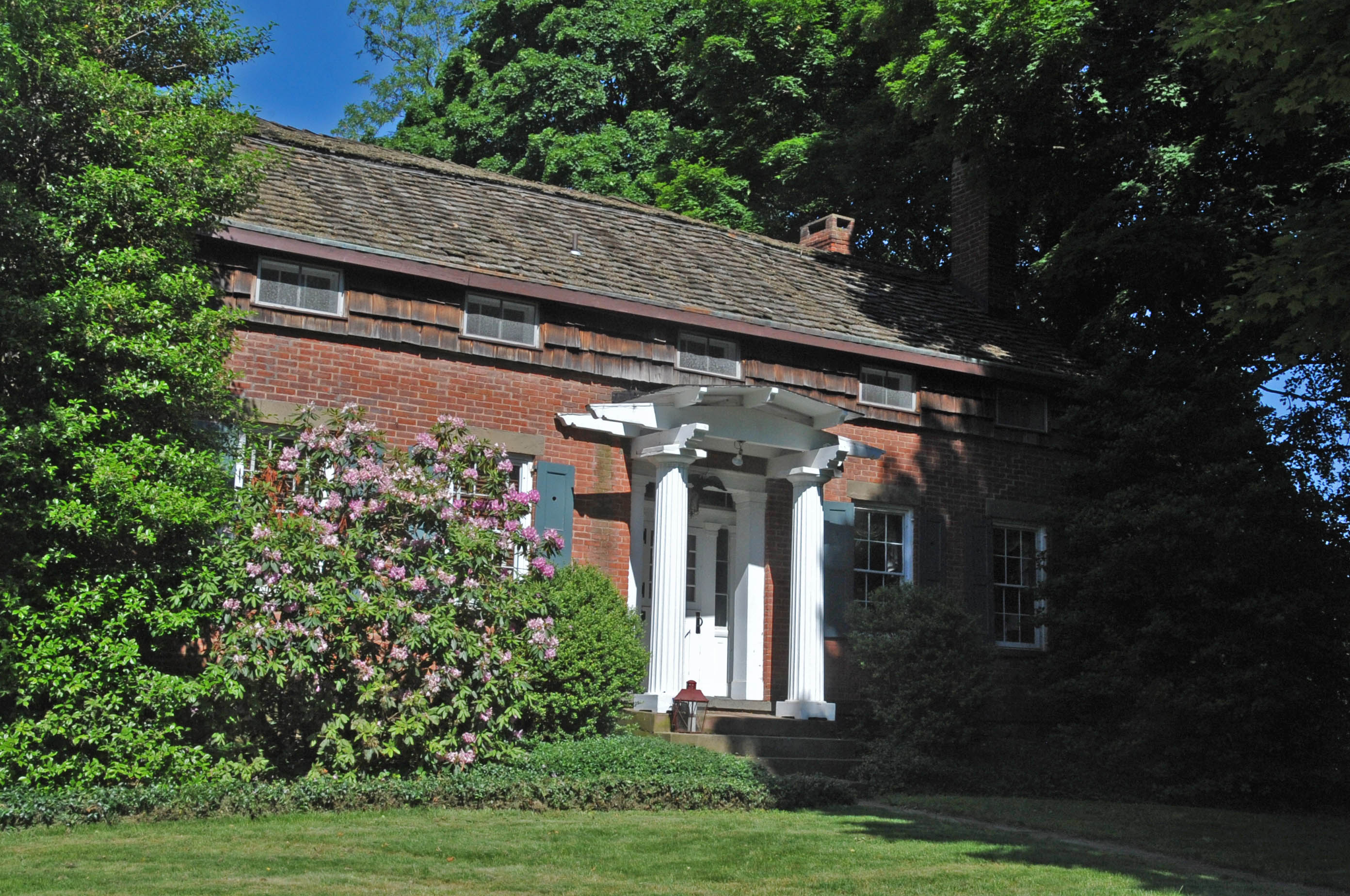

- Location within Morris County, New Jersey Location within New Jersey Location within the United States
- Location: 107 Changebridge Road, Montville, New Jersey
- Coordinates: 40°54′0″N 74°21′54″W
- Area: 4.4 acres (1.8 ha)
- Built: 1700s
- Architectural style: Greek Revival
- MPS: Dutch Stone Houses in Montville MPS
- NRHP reference No.: 91001931
- NJRHP No.: 2152

Significant dates
- Added to NRHP: January 17, 1992
- Designated NJRHP: November 25, 1991

Parsonage of the Montville Reformed Dutch Church is a historic church parsonage at 107 Changebridge Road in Montville, Morris County, New Jersey, United States.

107 Changebridge Road is a Greek Revival style structure. While additions to the house have been added since the original structure was built, the main structure and its 1810 addition remain unchanged. The house contains almost all of its original hardware, molding and flooring. There are seven fireplaces in the home. The stone walls are nearly three feet thick. It is a two-story structure with a brick facade and Greek Revival details. It has a gambrel roof with wooden shingles. It has an L-shaped floor plan with tall ceilings (nine feet on the first floor). There is a pond on the property as well. The structure served as the Parsonage of the Dutch Reformed Church of Montville.

Previously known as the Cornelius Doremus House, the Parsonage of the Montville Reformed Dutch Church was added to the National Register of Historic Places on January 17, 1992, for its significance in architecture.

It was part of a Multiple Property Documentation titled Dutch Stone Houses in Montville, N.J. submitted by Acroterion in September, 1990. Eight residences were included in the nomination, six of which were constructed between 1750 and 1790. Two had substantial additions/alterations — Effingham Low House, c. 1820 and Cornelius Doremus, 1840. Acroterion, on page 7 of their nominating documentation stated, “it is also noteworthy that the last true “Dutch” stone house was built in 1796.” By 1840, much of the original Doremus House had been subsumed by additions and alterations including the introduction of Greek Revival details on front facade. The 1840 renovations left the building a hybrid stylistically. It has a front (east) façade that is primarily Greek Revival, a side (south) facade that is a stone Dutch Colonial, and a rear (west) facade made of a mixture of stone, bricks and wood shingle siding.

The Doremus House was one of two houses, of the eight nominated, that was not included in the Historic American Buildings Survey (HABS). HABS is administered by the National Park Service and is the nation's first federal preservation program, begun in 1933 to document America's architectural heritage. Buildings are typically selected for HABS documentation because of their historic and/or architectural importance. The fundamental intent of HABS documentation is to illustrate and explain this significance. To date, over 38,600 historical structures have been documented by the program. The house was deemed historically significant due to its visible progression and changes over time and the influence that the opening of Montville due to the Morris Canal had on the township.

In October 2015, the existing house framing was evaluated. Through this process, it was determined that the house framing, which was constructed of mortared stone and brick masonry, is deteriorating and "in extremely poor condition." Also, according to the inspection report, the timber framing utilized throughout the house (roof, attic, second floor, and first floor) is "laid out insufficiently by today's standards."

== See also ==
- National Register of Historic Places listings in Morris County, New Jersey
