= Oak Dell =

- U.S. National Register of Historic Places
- New Jersey Register of Historic Places
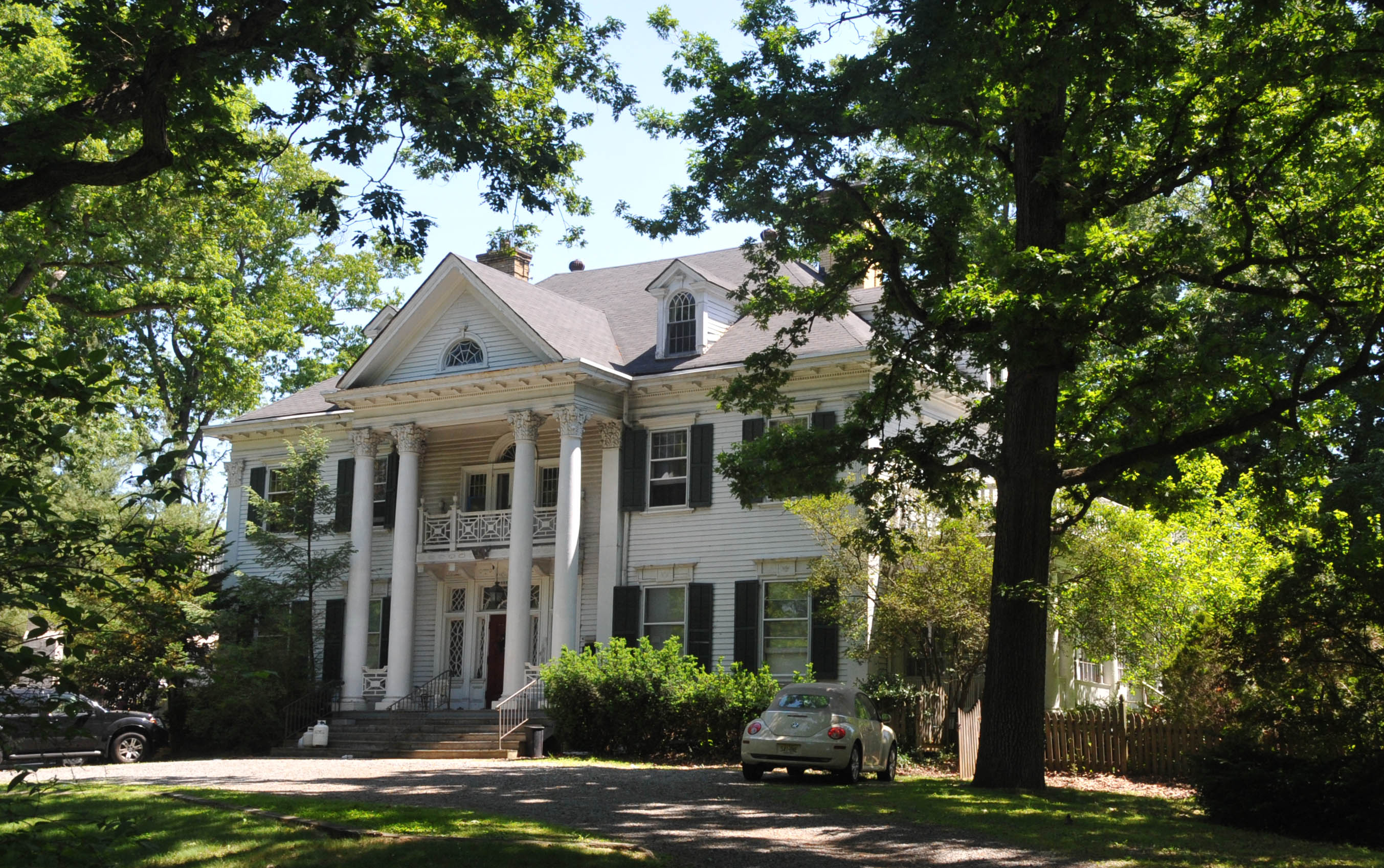

- Location within Morris County, New Jersey Location within New Jersey Location within the United States
- Location: Franklin Street and Madison Avenue; Morristown, New Jersey
- Coordinates: 40°47′20″N 74°27′37″W
- Built: 1897
- Architectural style: Colonial Revival
- MPS: Morristown Multiple Resource Area
- NRHP reference No.: 86003114
- NJRHP No.: 2196

Significant dates
- Added to NRHP: November 13, 1986
- Designated NJRHP: September 11, 1986

Oak Dell, also known as the Dr. Granville M. White House, is a historic mansion located at the corner of Franklin Street and Madison Avenue in the town of Morristown in Morris County, New Jersey. It is one of the few surviving mansions on "Millionaires Row" along Madison Avenue. Part of the Morristown Multiple Resource Area (MRA), it was listed on the National Register of Historic Places on November 13, 1986, for its significance in architecture.

== History and description ==
The two and one-half story house was built in 1897 and features Colonial Revival architectural style. The large entry portico has a triangular pediment supported by Corinthian columns. It was acquired by Grenville H. White of the Mutual Life Insurance Company of New York in 1910. White was also the president of the Morris County Golf Club. He sold the house in the 1950s.

== See also ==
- National Register of Historic Places listings in Morris County, New Jersey
