= Timothy Mills House =

- U.S. National Register of Historic Places
- New Jersey Register of Historic Places
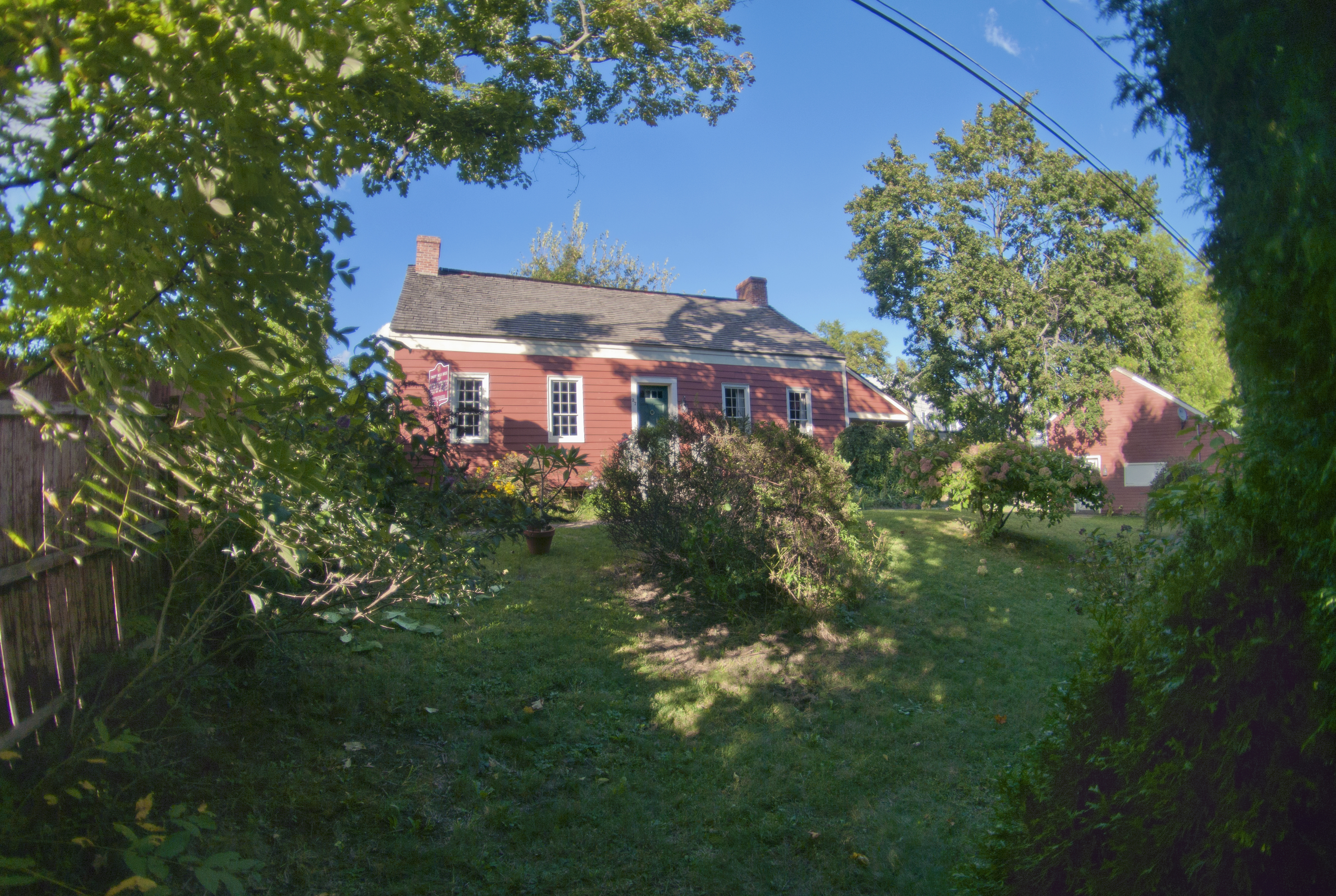

- Location within Morris County, New Jersey Location within New Jersey Location within the United States
- Location: 27 Mills Street; Morristown, New Jersey
- Coordinates: 40°48′05″N 74°29′24″W
- Built: c. 1740
- NRHP reference No.: 75001153
- NJRHP No.: 2189

Significant dates
- Added to NRHP: February 24, 1975
- Designated NJRHP: December 6, 1974

The Timothy Mills House is a historic house built c. 1740 and located at 27 Mills Street in the town of Morristown in Morris County, New Jersey. It was documented by the Historic American Buildings Survey in 1939. It was added to the National Register of Historic Places on February 24, 1975, for its significance in architecture.

== History and description ==
Timothy Mills, born in Jamaica, Long Island, came to Morristown with his brother around 1740. He married Phebe Lindsley in 1742, and they had nine children in this house. His son Timothy next owned the house, followed by his son John. He was a trustee of the Morristown First Presbyterian Church. The one and one-half story house has 18th century vernacular style. According to the nomination form, it is the oldest extant building in Morristown.

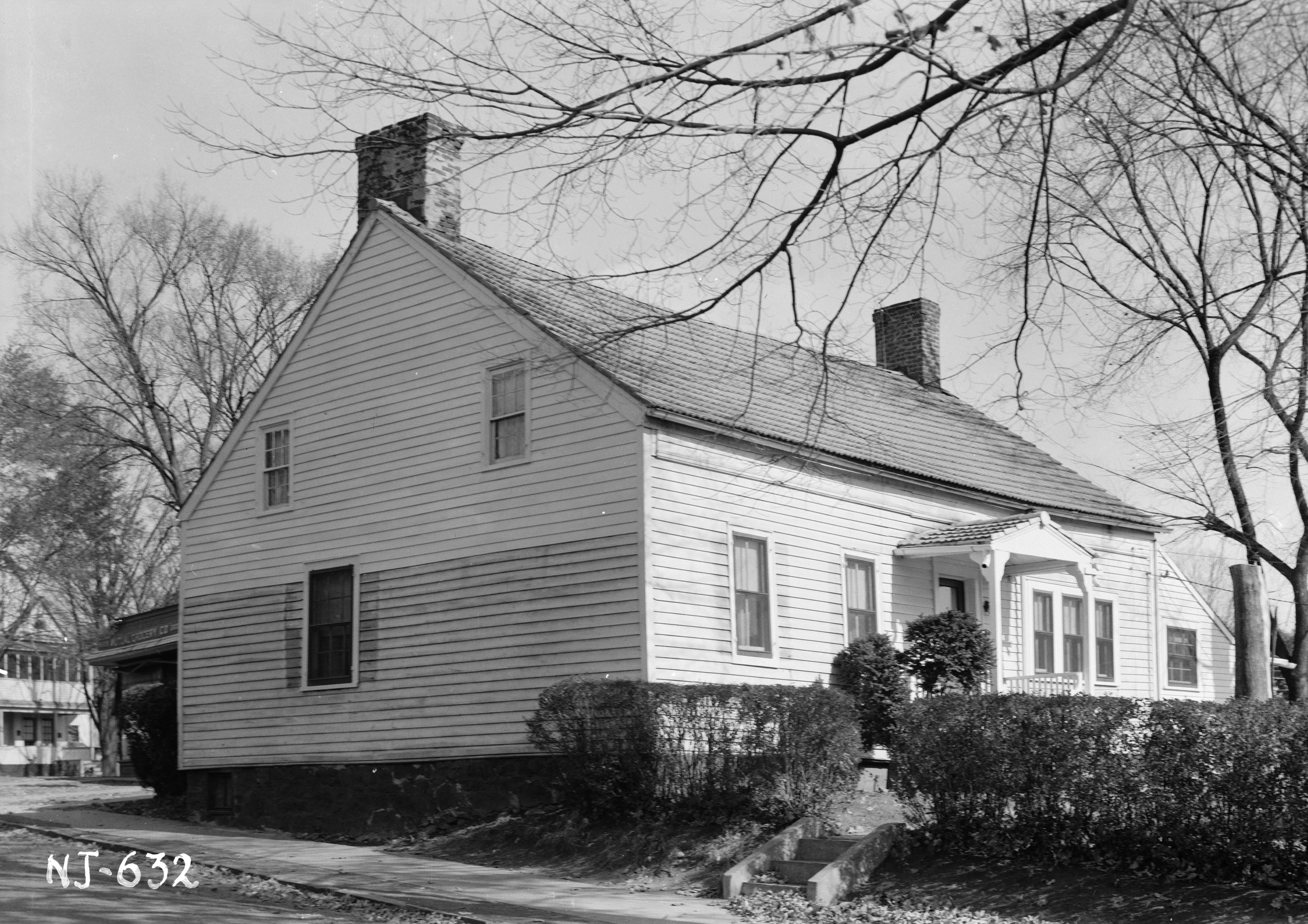
HABS photo from 1939

== See also ==
- National Register of Historic Places listings in Morris County, New Jersey
- List of the oldest buildings in New Jersey
