= Nicholas Vreeland Outkitchen =

- U.S. National Register of Historic Places
- New Jersey Register of Historic Places
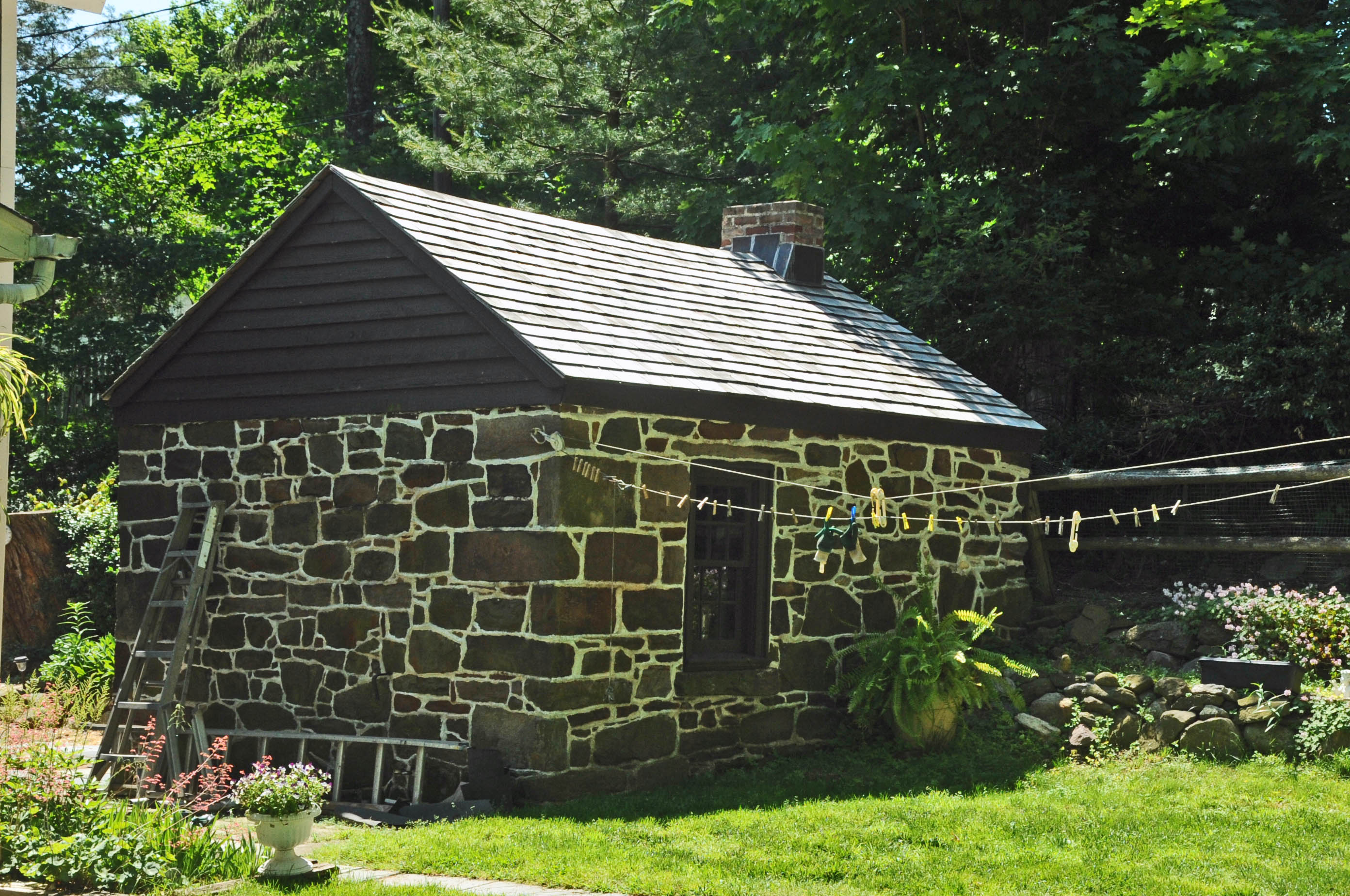

- Location within Morris County, New Jersey Location within New Jersey Location within the United States
- Location: 52 Jacksonville Road; Towaco, New Jersey
- Coordinates: 40°56′06″N 74°20′34″W
- Area: 0.7 acres (0.28 ha)
- Built: c. 1780
- Architectural style: Colonial, Dutch Colonial
- NRHP reference No.: 09001076
- NJRHP No.: 2168

Significant dates
- Added to NRHP: December 11, 2009
- Designated NJRHP: September 10, 2009

The Nicholas Vreeland Outkitchen, also known as the John H. Vreeland Outkitchen, is a historic stone building located at 52 Jacksonville Road in the Towaco section of the township of Montville in Morris County, New Jersey, United States. Built c. 1780, it was documented by the Historic American Buildings Survey in 1938. It was added to the National Register of Historic Places on December 11, 2009, for its significance in architecture. The building contributes to the domestic architecture theme of the Dutch Stone Houses in Montville Multiple Property Submission (MPS).

== History and description ==
The outkitchen was part of a 180-acre (73 ha) farm worked by Nicholas "Claes" Vreeland around the last quarter of the 18th century. In 1811, his son, Hartman N. Vreeland (1762–1823), inherited the farm. In 1823, his son, John H. Vreeland inherited it. The outkitchen is a one-story limestone building featuring Dutch Colonial architecture. It has been restored and is currently used as a museum.

== See also ==
- National Register of Historic Places listings in Morris County, New Jersey
