= Dusenberry House =

Historic house in New Jersey, United States

- U.S. National Register of Historic Places
- New Jersey Register of Historic Places
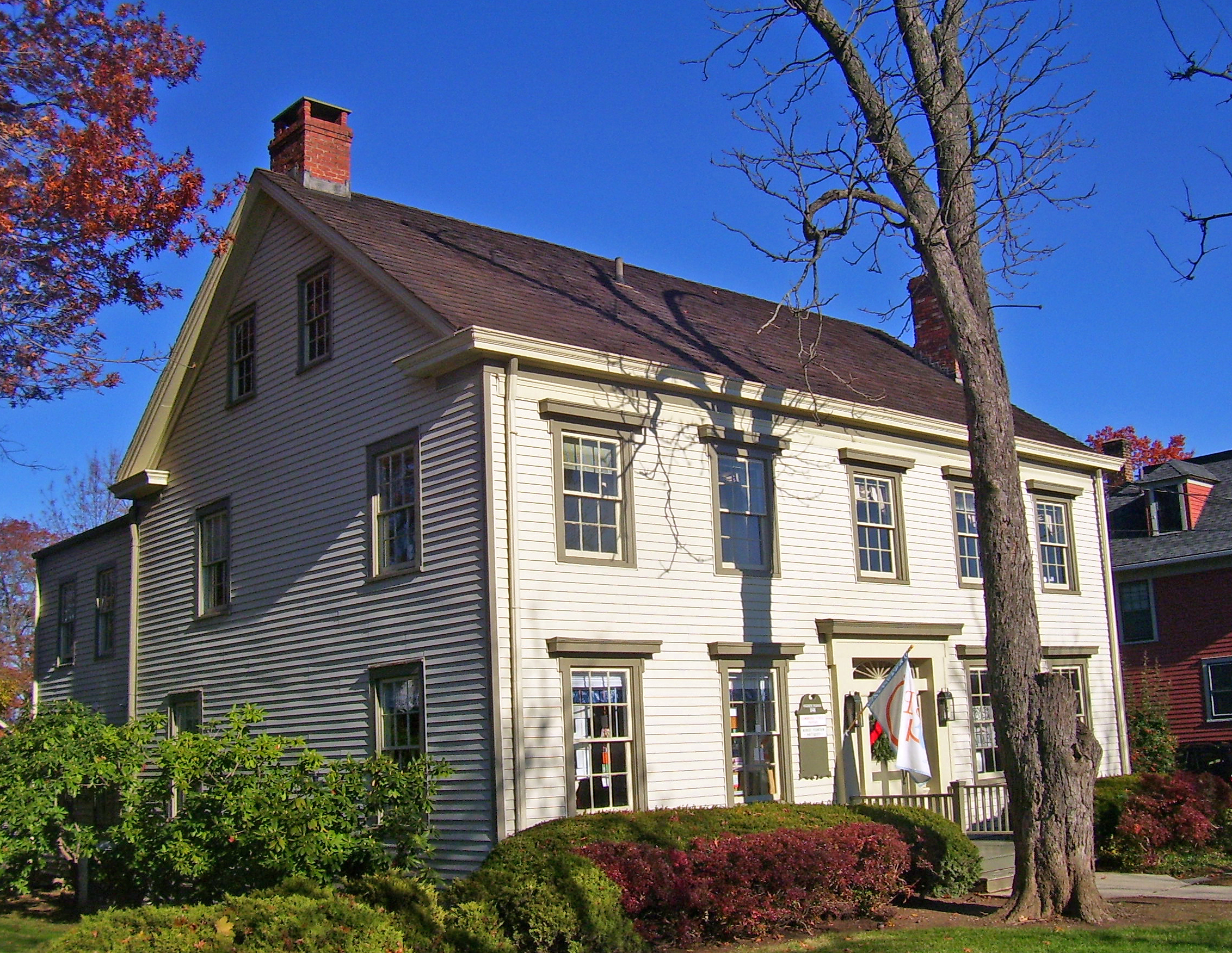
- House in 2007

- Location within Morris County, New Jersey Location within New Jersey Location within the United States
- Location: Chatham Borough, NJ
- Nearest city: Summit
- Coordinates: 40°44′24″N 74°22′47″W
- Area: 0.5 acres (0.20 ha)
- Built: 1848
- Architectural style: Greek Revival
- NRHP reference No.: 79001515
- NJRHP No.: 2096

Significant dates
- Added to NRHP: November 1, 1979
- Designated NJRHP: May 9, 1979

The Dusenberry House is a mid-19th-century building located on Main Street in Chatham Borough, Morris County, New Jersey, United States. It is sometimes known as the Presbyterian Parsonage, since it most notable as the home of the Rev. Joseph Meeker Ogden, pastor for 45 years of the Presbyterian church in the town currently named after him. It was also the birthplace of his son, Joseph Wallace Ogden, who founded the brokerage firm J. W. Ogden & Company.

In 1979 it was added to the National Register of Historic Places. It is currently used as a store.

== See also ==
- National Register of Historic Places listings in Morris County, New Jersey
