= Bowlsby–Degelleke House =

Historic house in New Jersey, United States

- Bowlsby-Degelleke House
- U.S. National Register of Historic Places
- New Jersey Register of Historic Places
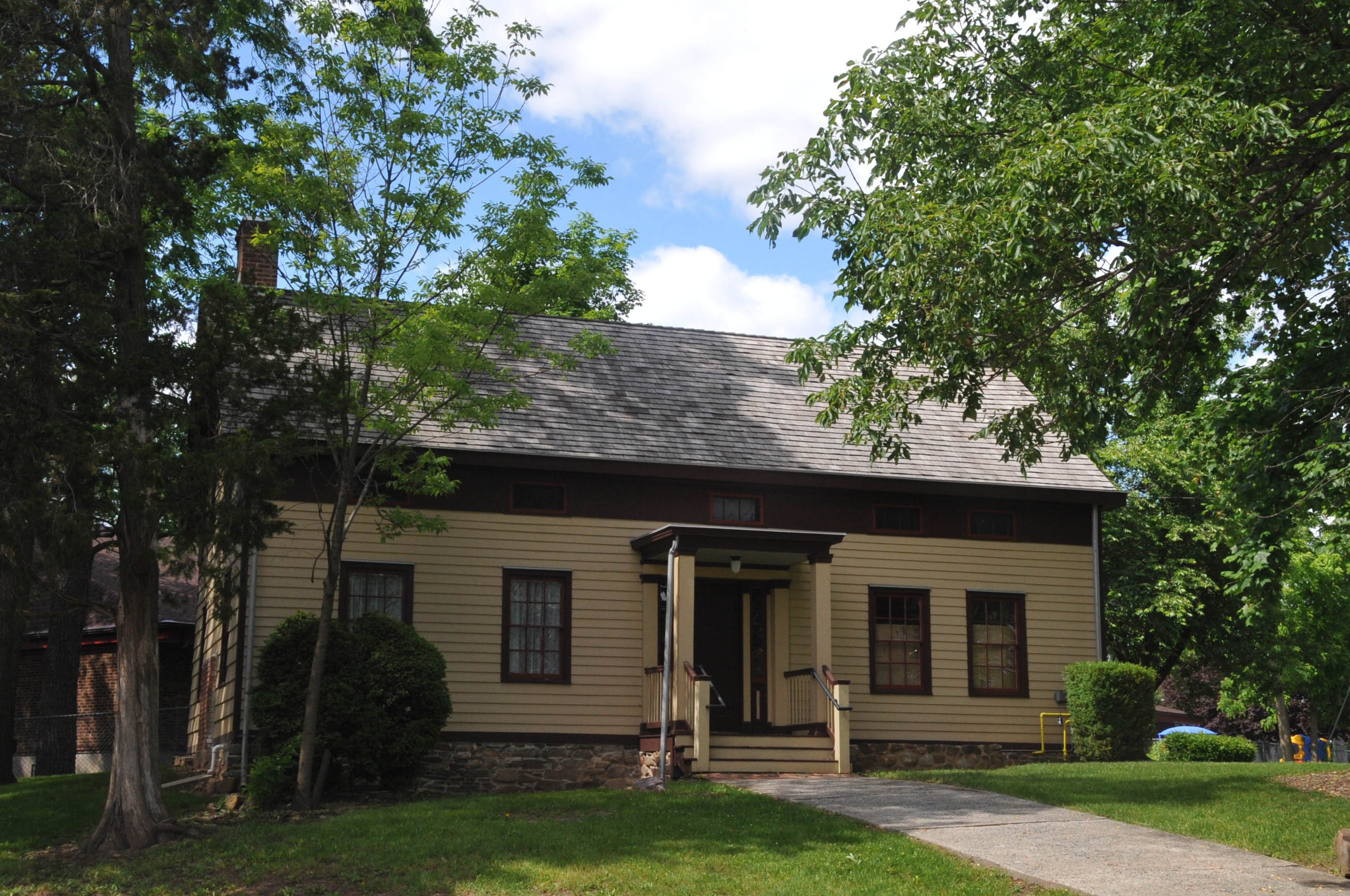

- Location within Morris County, New Jersey Location within New Jersey Location within the United States
- Location: 25 Baldwin Road, Parsippany–Troy Hills, New Jersey
- Coordinates: 40°52′7″N 74°23′46″W
- Area: 1.9 acres (0.77 ha)
- Built: 1790
- NRHP reference No.: 78001784
- NJRHP No.: 2213

Significant dates
- Added to NRHP: December 15, 1978
- Designated NJRHP: December 13, 1978

Bowlsby–Degelleke House is located in Parsippany–Troy Hills, Morris County, New Jersey, United States. The house was built in 1790 and added to the National Register of Historic Places on December 15, 1978.

== See also ==
- National Register of Historic Places listings in Morris County, New Jersey
