= Sayre House =

Historic house in New Jersey, United States

- U.S. National Register of Historic Places
- New Jersey Register of Historic Places
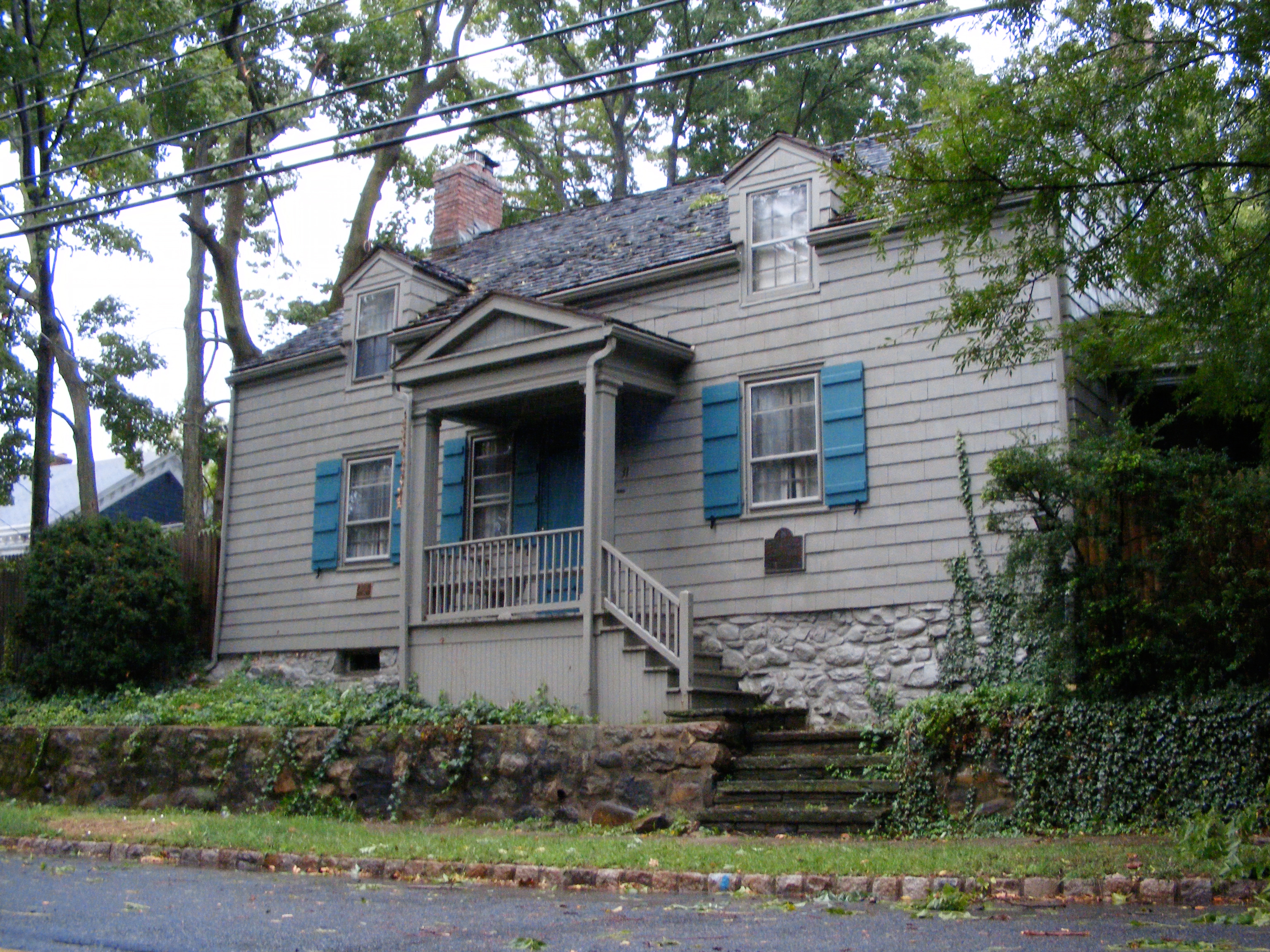

- Location within Morris County, New Jersey Location within New Jersey Location within the United States
- Location: 31 Ridgedale Avenue, Madison, New Jersey
- Coordinates: 40.76279°N 74.41571°W
- Built: c.1745
- NRHP reference No.: 80002513
- NJRHP No.: 2144

Significant dates
- Added to NRHP: February 12, 1980
- Designated NJRHP: December 12, 1979

The Sayre House is located in Madison, Morris County, New Jersey, United States. The house was built c. 1745 and added to the National Register of Historic Places on February 12, 1980.

According to two signs on the front of the house, General Anthony Wayne occupied the house in 1777 while the Continental Army was encamped in the area.

== See also ==
- National Register of Historic Places listings in Morris County, New Jersey
