= Madison Masonic Lodge =

- Madison Masonic Tample
- U.S. National Register of Historic Places
- New Jersey Register of Historic Places
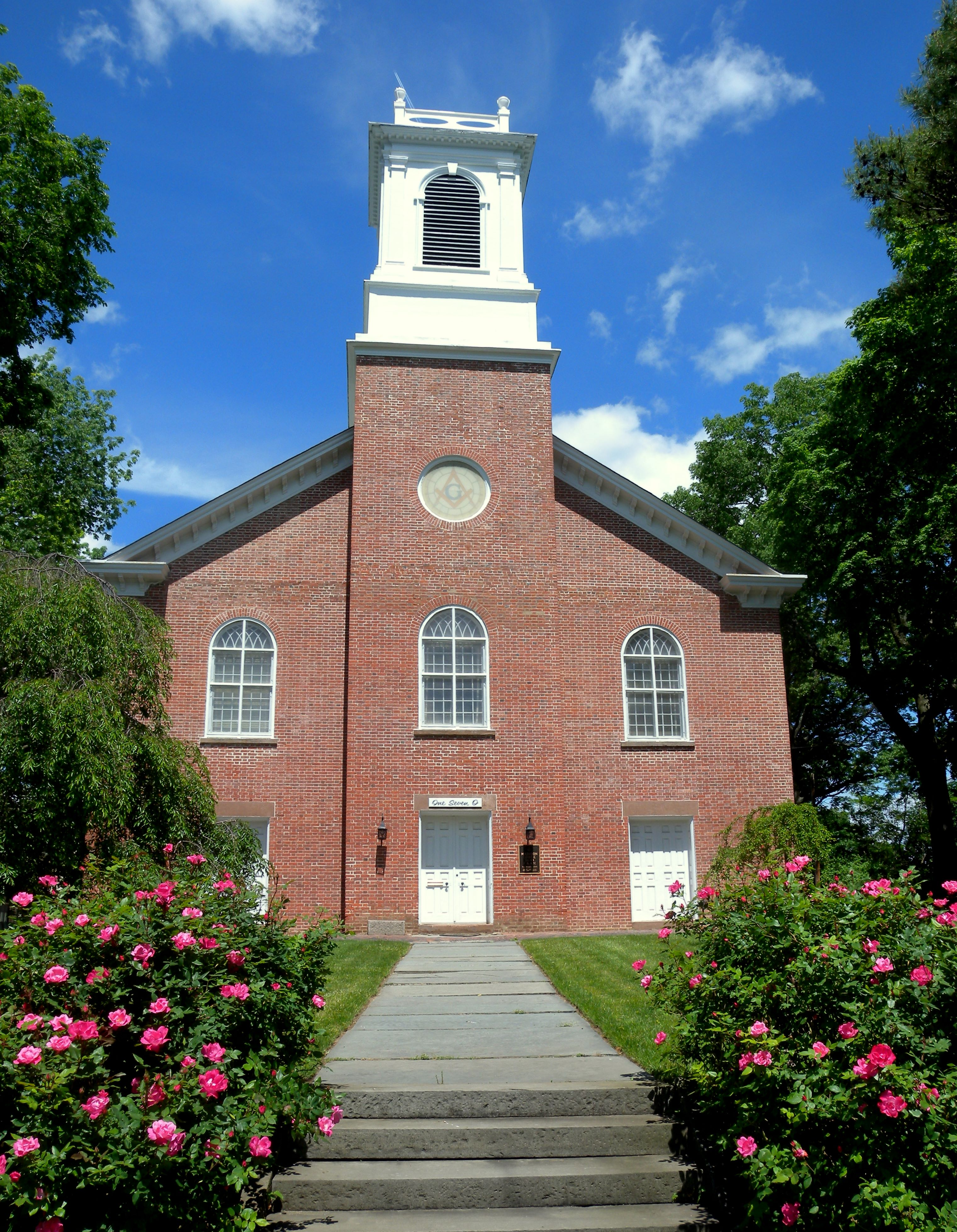

- Location within Morris County, New Jersey Location within New Jersey Location within the United States
- Location: 170 Main Street, Madison, New Jersey
- Coordinates: 40.75570°N 74.40907°W
- Built: 1825
- Architectural style: Federal
- NRHP reference No.: 07001405
- NJRHP No.: 4732

Significant dates
- Added to NRHP: January 17, 2008
- Designated NJRHP: September 20, 2007

Madison Masonic Temple is the name of a historic Masonic lodge building. The building, also known as the Old Main Street Church, is located at 170 Main Street in the borough of Madison in Morris County, New Jersey, United States. The brick church building was completed in 1825 by the Presbyterian Church of Chatham Township, later known as the Presbyterian Church of Madison in 1846. The building was purchased by Madison Lodge No. 93 Free & Accepted Masons in 1930. It was added to the National Register of Historic Places on January 17, 2008, for its significance in architecture. The building combines the Classical architecture of Wren–Gibbs with Federal architecture.

== See also ==
- National Register of Historic Places listings in Morris County, New Jersey
- List of Masonic buildings in the United States
