= Glanville Blacksmith Shop =

- U.S. National Register of Historic Places
- New Jersey Register of Historic Places
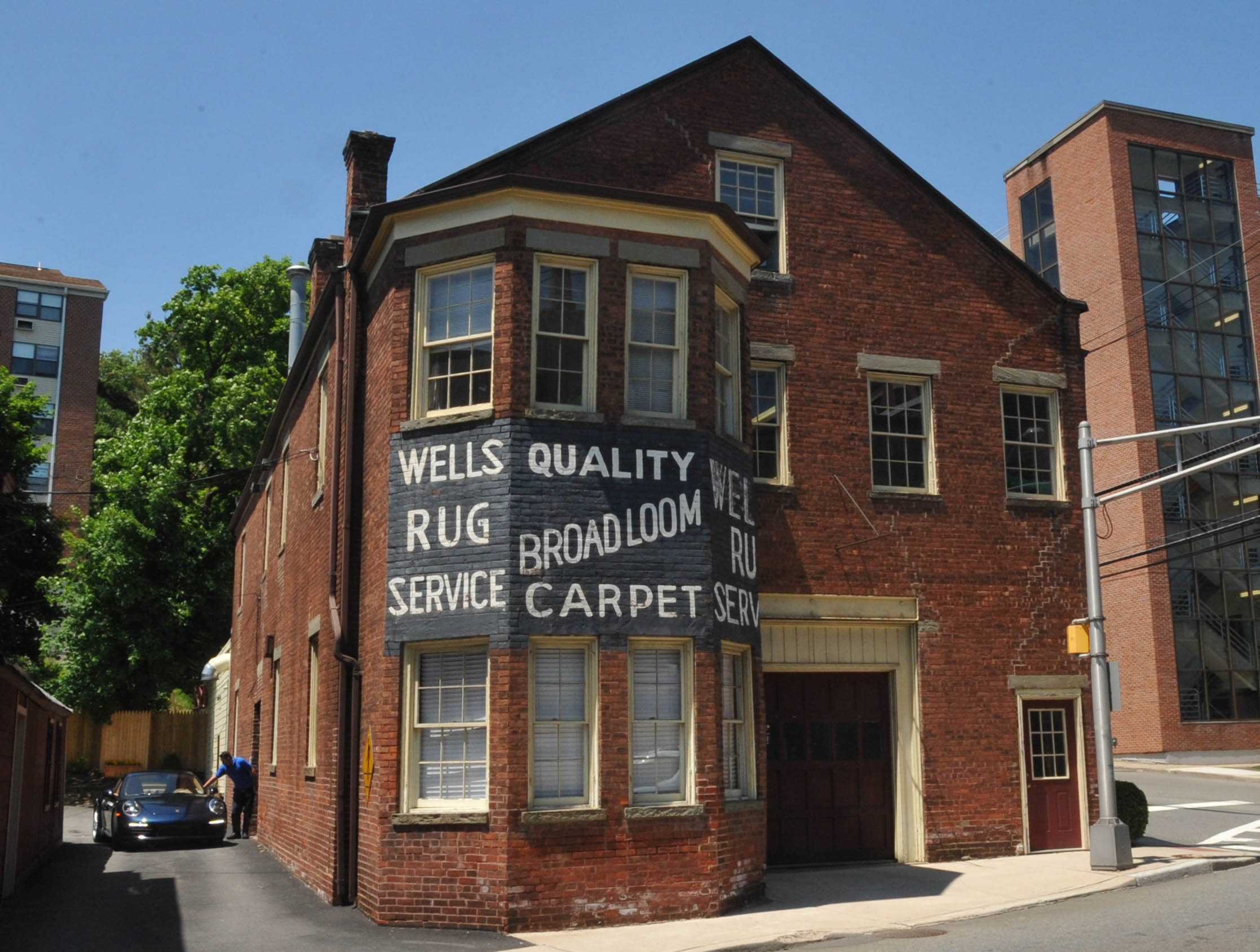

- Location within Morris County, New Jersey Location within New Jersey Location within the United States
- Location: 45–47 Bank Street; Morristown, New Jersey
- Coordinates: 40°47′43″N 74°29′01″W
- Built: 1901
- Architectural style: Colonial Revival, Vernacular Colonial Revival
- MPS: Morristown Multiple Resource Area
- NRHP reference No.: 86003112
- NJRHP No.: 2187

Significant dates
- Added to NRHP: March 25, 1987
- Designated NJRHP: September 11, 1986

The Glanville Blacksmith Shop is a historic brick building located at 45 Bank Street in the town of Morristown in Morris County, New Jersey. Part of the Morristown Multiple Resource Area (MRA), it was added to the National Register of Historic Places on March 25, 1987, for its significance in architecture. The listing also includes a former livery stable, the frame building at 47 Bank Street.

== History and description ==
In 1895, J. P. Glanville moved his blacksmith shop to this location. In 1901, Frank J. Glanville was the blacksmith in a new building. The two and one-half story brick building features vernacular Colonial Revival style and a semi-octagonal front bay. In 1905, Henry W. Armstrong was operating a new livery stable next to the blacksmith shop.

== See also ==
- National Register of Historic Places listings in Morris County, New Jersey
