= Little Red Schoolhouse (Florham Park, New Jersey) =

- U.S. National Register of Historic Places
- New Jersey Register of Historic Places
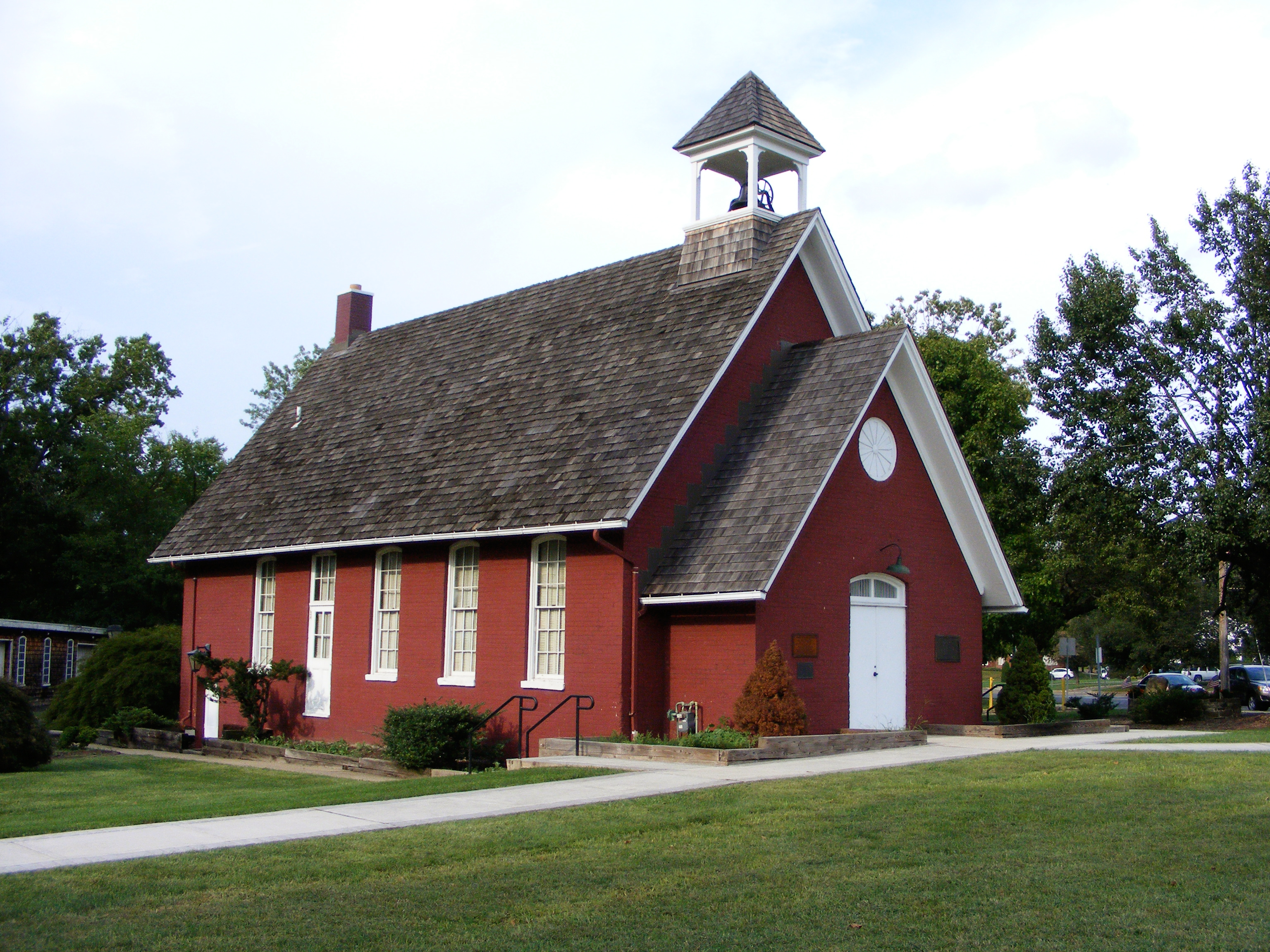

- Location within Morris County, New Jersey Location within New Jersey Location within the United States
- Location: 203 Ridgedale Avenue; Florham Park, New Jersey
- Coordinates: 40°47′17″N 74°23′26″W
- Area: 1.2 acres (0.49 ha)
- Built: 1866
- Architect: Willard E. Howell
- NRHP reference No.: 73001122
- NJRHP No.: 2120

Significant dates
- Added to NRHP: June 6, 1986
- Designated NJRHP: June 13, 1973

The Little Red Schoolhouse, also known as the Columbia School District No. 5 Schoolhouse, is located at 203 Ridgedale Avenue in the borough of Florham Park in Morris County, New Jersey. It was added to the National Register of Historic Places on June 6, 1986, for its significance in architecture and education. It is now operated as a museum by The Historical Society of Florham Park.

== History and description ==
Built in 1866, the schoolhouse is a vernacular Italianate one-story narrow red brick masonry building with a steep roof and tall 9/9 windows topped with gently arches. In 1905, it was expanded from four bays to the current six. The open belfry at the front peak with working bell and the gable-end entrance make it instantly identifiable as a typical 19th century one-room schoolhouse.

Its location at the historic crossroads of Florham Park has remained a key reminder of the borough's rural origins. The classic schoolhouse is the borough's icon, appearing on the town flag, letterhead, website, and public works and first responder vehicles. In 1978, the schoolhouse was moved back several yards to accommodate the expanded Columbia Turnpike.

Part of the museum is set up as a schoolroom from a century ago and mini lectures are offered for small groups of students and Scouts. Exhibits illustrate the development of Florham Park from a rural farming community, to the home of three major estates, and the community's growth into a modern suburb. As a museum it includes artifacts such as broom making equipment, old maps and old school desks, and more from the 1800s and 1900s.

== See also ==
- National Register of Historic Places listings in Morris County, New Jersey
