= Rockaway Valley Methodist Church =

Historic church in New Jersey, United States

- Rockaway Valley United Methodist Church
- U.S. National Register of Historic Places
- New Jersey Register of Historic Places

- Location within Morris County, New Jersey Location within New Jersey Location within the United States
- Location: 38 Valley Road, northwest of Washington Avenue; Boonton Township, New Jersey
- Nearest city: Boonton, New Jersey
- Coordinates: 40°55′42″N 74°26′12″W
- Area: 1.5 acres (0.61 ha)
- Built: 1842
- NRHP reference No.: 77000891
- NJRHP No.: 2092

Significant dates
- Added to NRHP: November 11, 1977
- Designated NJRHP: December 13, 1976

Rockaway Valley United Methodist Church is a historic church located on Valley Road, northwest of Boonton, in Boonton Township of Morris County, New Jersey.

It was built in 1842 and added to the New Jersey Register of Historic Places in 1976. The next year, in 1977, it was added to the National Register.

== See also ==
- National Register of Historic Places listings in Morris County, New Jersey
