= Friends Meetinghouse (Randolph, New Jersey) =

Historic meetinghouse in New Jersey, United States

- Randolph Friends Meetinghouse
- U.S. National Register of Historic Places
- New Jersey Register of Historic Places
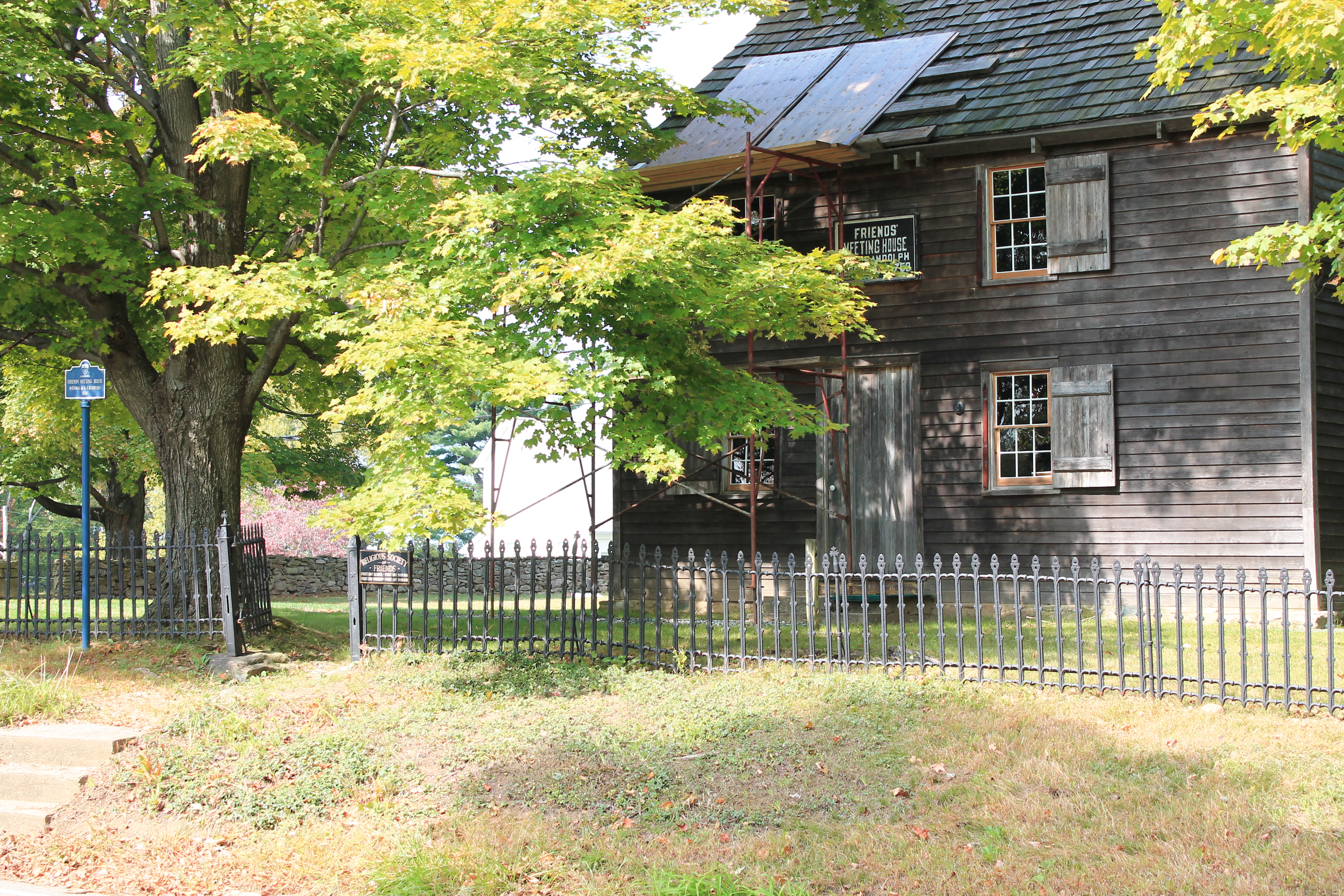

- Location within Morris County, New Jersey Location within New Jersey Location within the United States
- Nearest city: Randolph, New Jersey
- Coordinates: 40°51′54″N 74°34′11″W
- Area: 1 acre (0.40 ha)
- Built: 1758
- NRHP reference No.: 73001121
- NJRHP No.: 2229

Significant dates
- Added to NRHP: June 4, 1973
- Designated NJRHP: January 29, 1973

Randolph Friends Meetinghouse is a historic Quaker meeting house in Randolph, Morris County, New Jersey, United States. The land on which the Meeting House stands was purchased by a small group of Quakers in 1758 for a burying ground, i.e. Cemetery The same year a subscription was raised to build a Meeting House on the site for religious and business meetings.

== History ==
Presumably, English colonists built the Meetinghouse, completing it in 1758.

On October 22, 1898, a board of trustees formed the Friends Meeting House and Cemetery Association and bought the site in order to preserve it for future generations.

The site was added to the National Register of Historic Places in 1973.

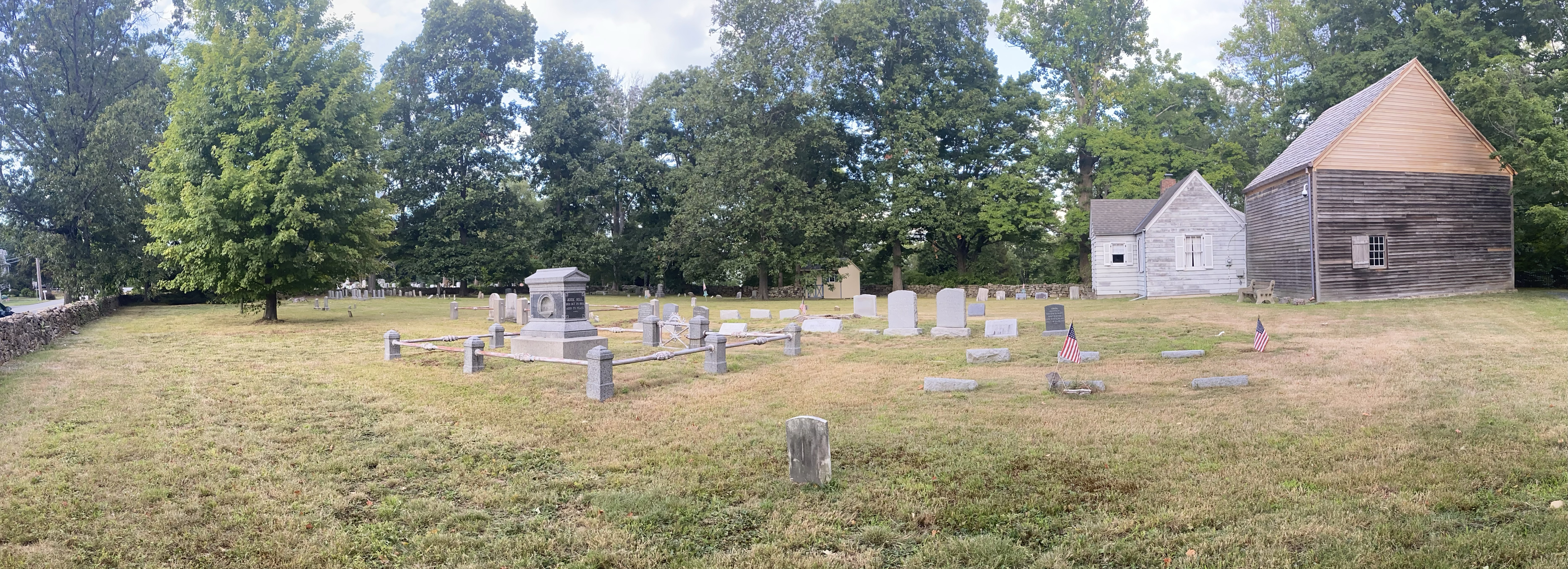
Panoramic view of Meetinghouse and adjoining cemetery, 2022.

== See also ==
- National Register of Historic Places listings in Morris County, New Jersey
