= Miller-Kingsland House =

Historic house in New Jersey, United States

- U.S. National Register of Historic Places
- New Jersey Register of Historic Places
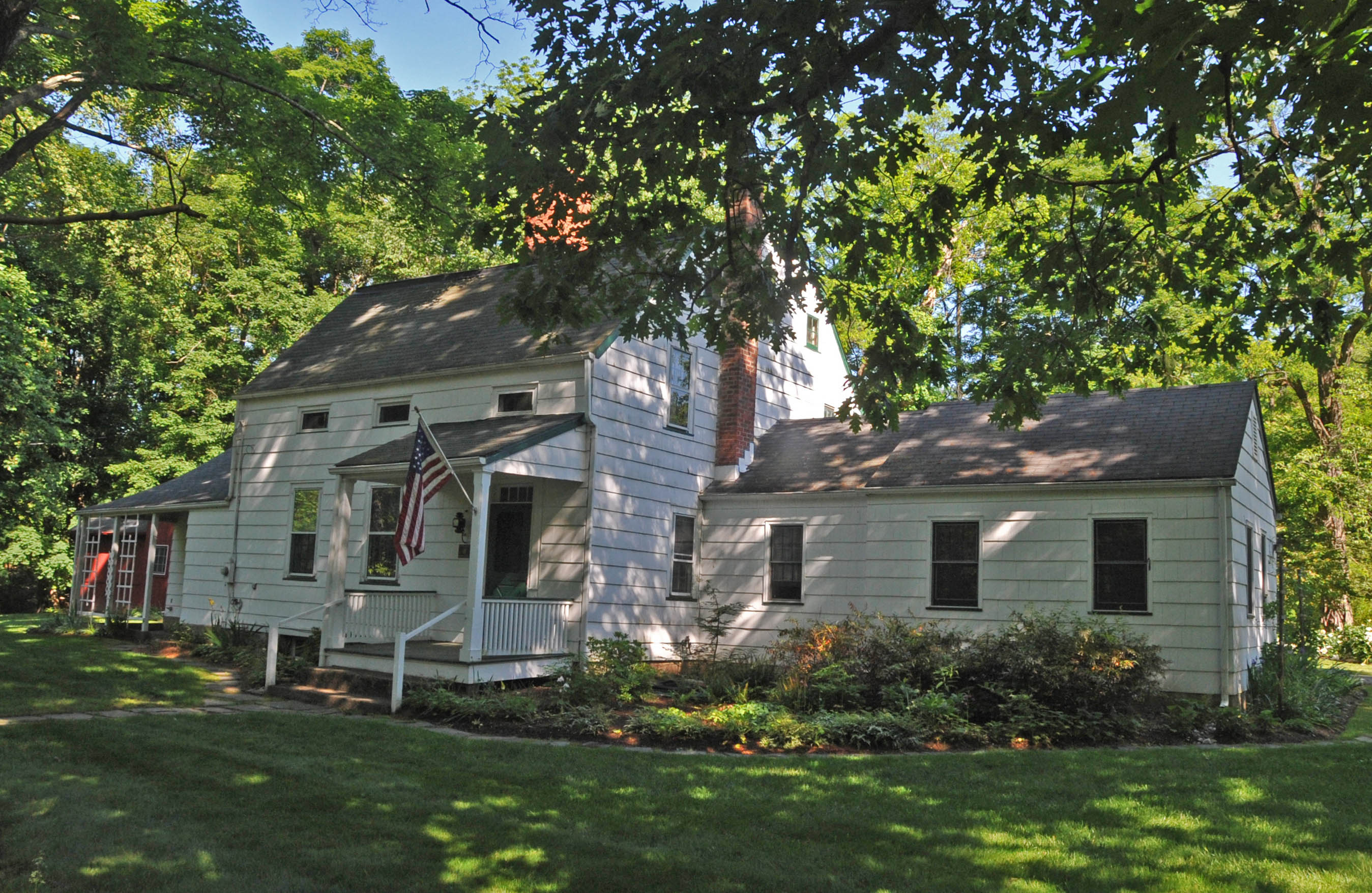

- Location within Morris County, New Jersey Location within New Jersey Location within the United States
- Location: 445 Vreeland Avenue, Boonton, New Jersey
- Coordinates: 40°54′2″N 74°23′13″W
- Area: 7 acres (2.8 ha)
- Built: c. 1740
- Built by: Johannes Miller
- NRHP reference No.: 73001120
- NJRHP No.: 2088

Significant dates
- Added to NRHP: July 24, 1973
- Designated NJRHP: June 13, 1973

The Miller-Kingsland House is located at 445 Vreeland Avenue in the town of Boonton in Morris County, New Jersey, United States. The house was built around 1740 and documented by the Historic American Buildings Survey (HABS) in 1938. It was added to the National Register of Historic Places on July 24, 1973, for its significance in architecture and exploration/settlement.

== History and description ==
The Miller-Kingsland House is the oldest recorded home in Boonton. The original Dutch house was one-room with a sleeping attic, built by Johannes Miller around 1740. This room, which is complete with a large cooking fireplace and beehive oven, makes up the west wing of the current structure. The property was sold to Isaac Kingsland in 1798. He added the two and one-half story main section in 1808. It features Dutch style and a gambrel roof.

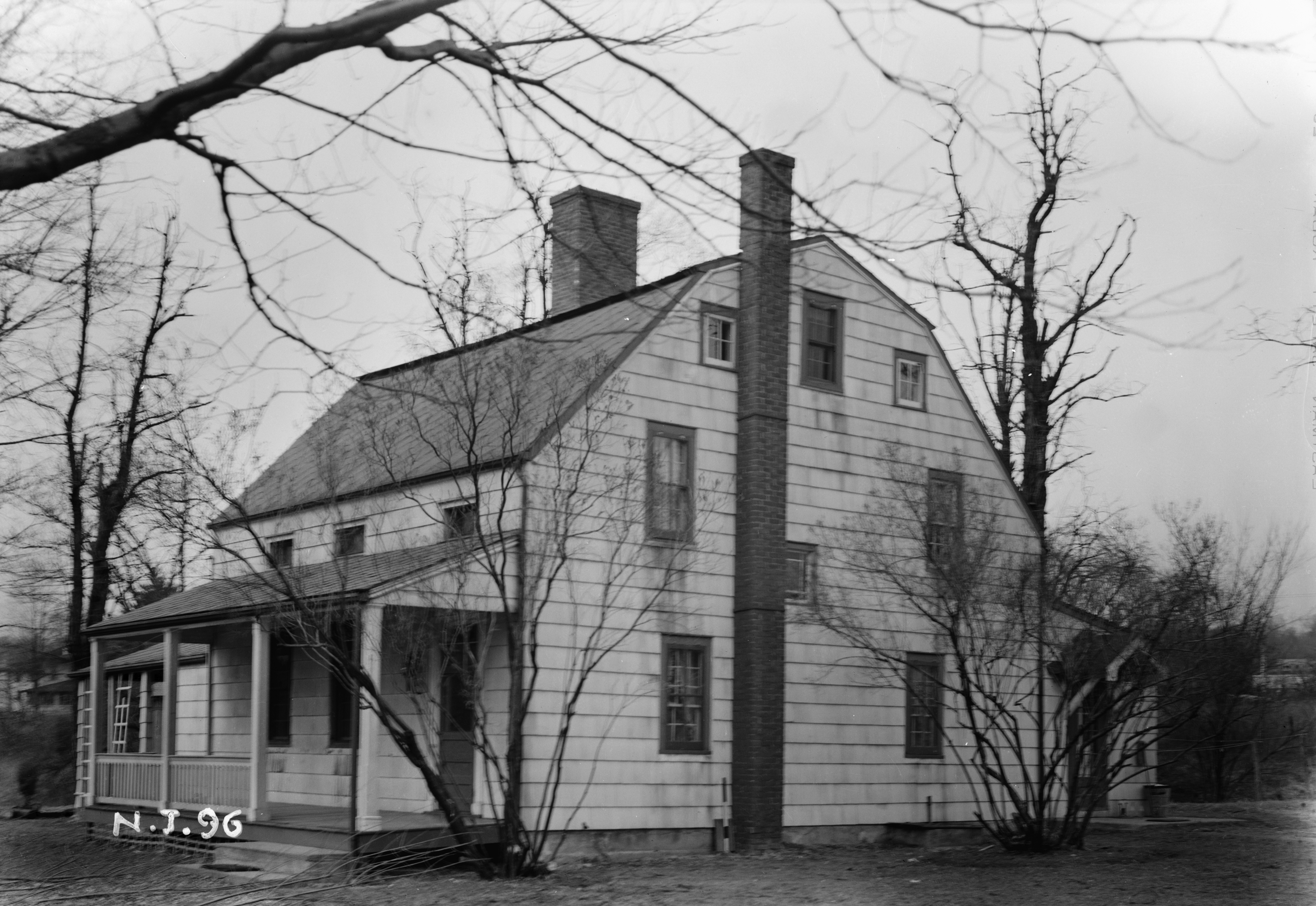
HABS photo from 1938

== See also ==
- National Register of Historic Places listings in Morris County, New Jersey
