= Craft–Clausen House =

Historic house in New Jersey, United States

- U.S. National Register of Historic Places
- New Jersey Register of Historic Places
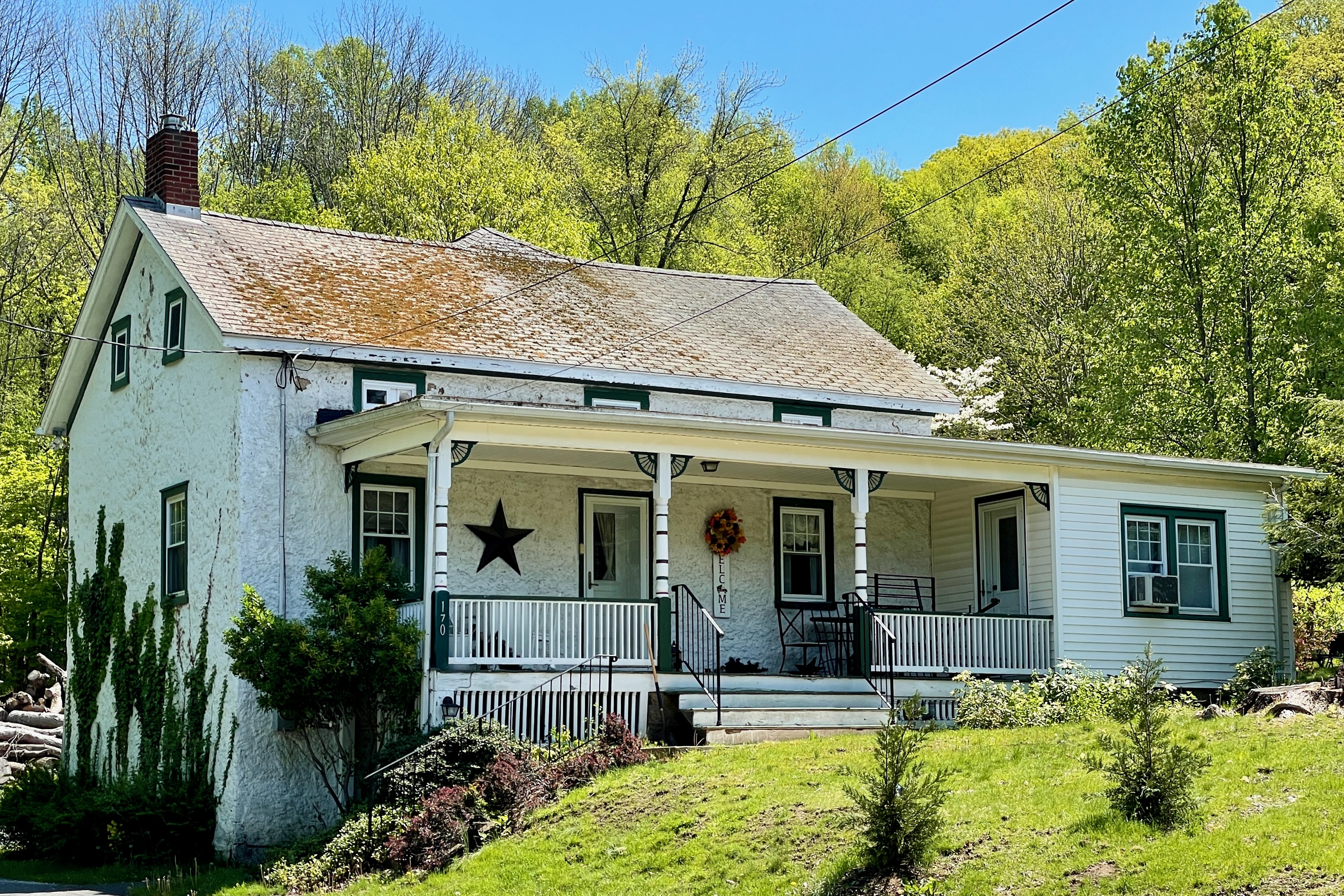
- Craft–Clausen House in 2021

- Location within Morris County, New Jersey Location within New Jersey Location within the United States
- Location: 170 Fairmont Road, Washington Township, New Jersey
- Coordinates: 40°46′06″N 74°46′07″W
- Area: 4.1 acres (1.7 ha)
- Architectural style: Mid 19th Century Revival
- MPS: Stone Houses and Outbuildings in Washington Township
- NRHP reference No.: 92000372
- NJRHP No.: 2257

Significant dates
- Added to NRHP: May 1, 1992
- Designated NJRHP: March 9, 1992

The Craft–Clausen House is a historic stone house located at 170 Fairmont Road in Washington Township, Morris County, New Jersey. It was added to the National Register of Historic Places on May 1, 1992, for its significance in architecture. The house is part of the Stone Houses and Outbuildings in Washington Township Multiple Property Submission (MPS).

== History ==
John Craft bought the property here in 1848 and likely built the house soon after. The property was then sold to William Clausen in 1869. The next owner was Walter Parley in 1924.

== Description ==
The house is a 1 1/2-story stone building with a gable roof and Victorian architecture details. It was enlarged in 1924 with a small frame addition. The property also includes two outbuildings: a wagon house and a chicken coop.

== See also ==
- National Register of Historic Places listings in Morris County, New Jersey
