= Flocktown Schoolhouse =

- U.S. National Register of Historic Places
- New Jersey Register of Historic Places
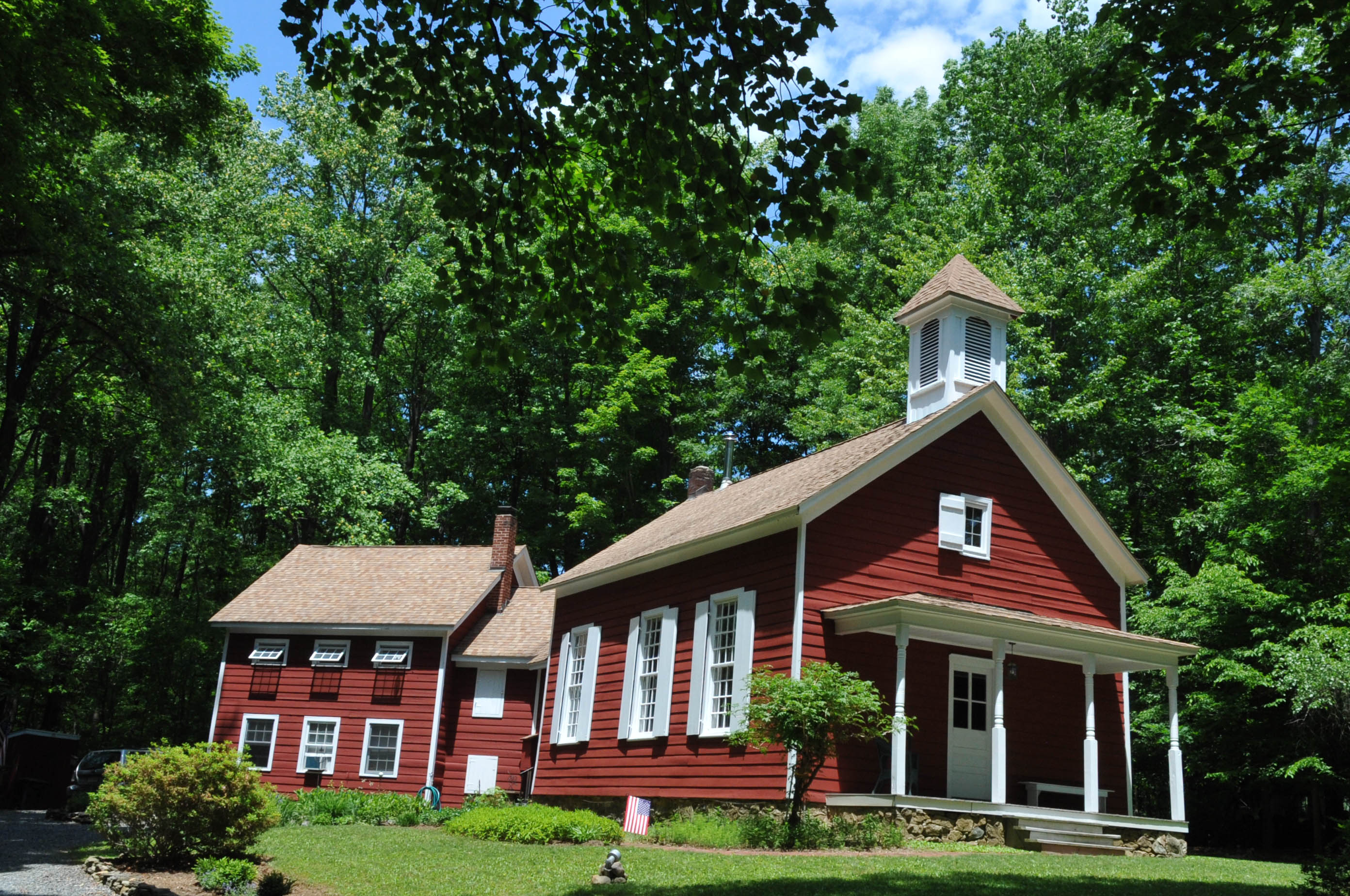

- Location within Morris County, New Jersey Location within New Jersey Location within the United States
- Location: Intersection of Flocktown and Naughright Roads, Washington Township, New Jersey
- Coordinates: 40°48′57″N 74°47′13″W
- Area: 1.1 acres (0.45 ha)
- Built: c. 1869
- NRHP reference No.: 82001046
- NJRHP No.: 2259

Significant dates
- Added to NRHP: November 30, 1982
- Designated NJRHP: September 13, 1982

Flocktown Schoolhouse is located near the intersection of Flocktown and Naughright Roads in Washington Township, Morris County, New Jersey. The schoolhouse was built c. 1869 and was added to the National Register of Historic Places on November 30, 1982, for its significance in architecture and education.

== See also ==
- National Register of Historic Places listings in Morris County, New Jersey
