= Mount Freedom Presbyterian Church =

Historic church in New Jersey, United States

- U.S. National Register of Historic Places
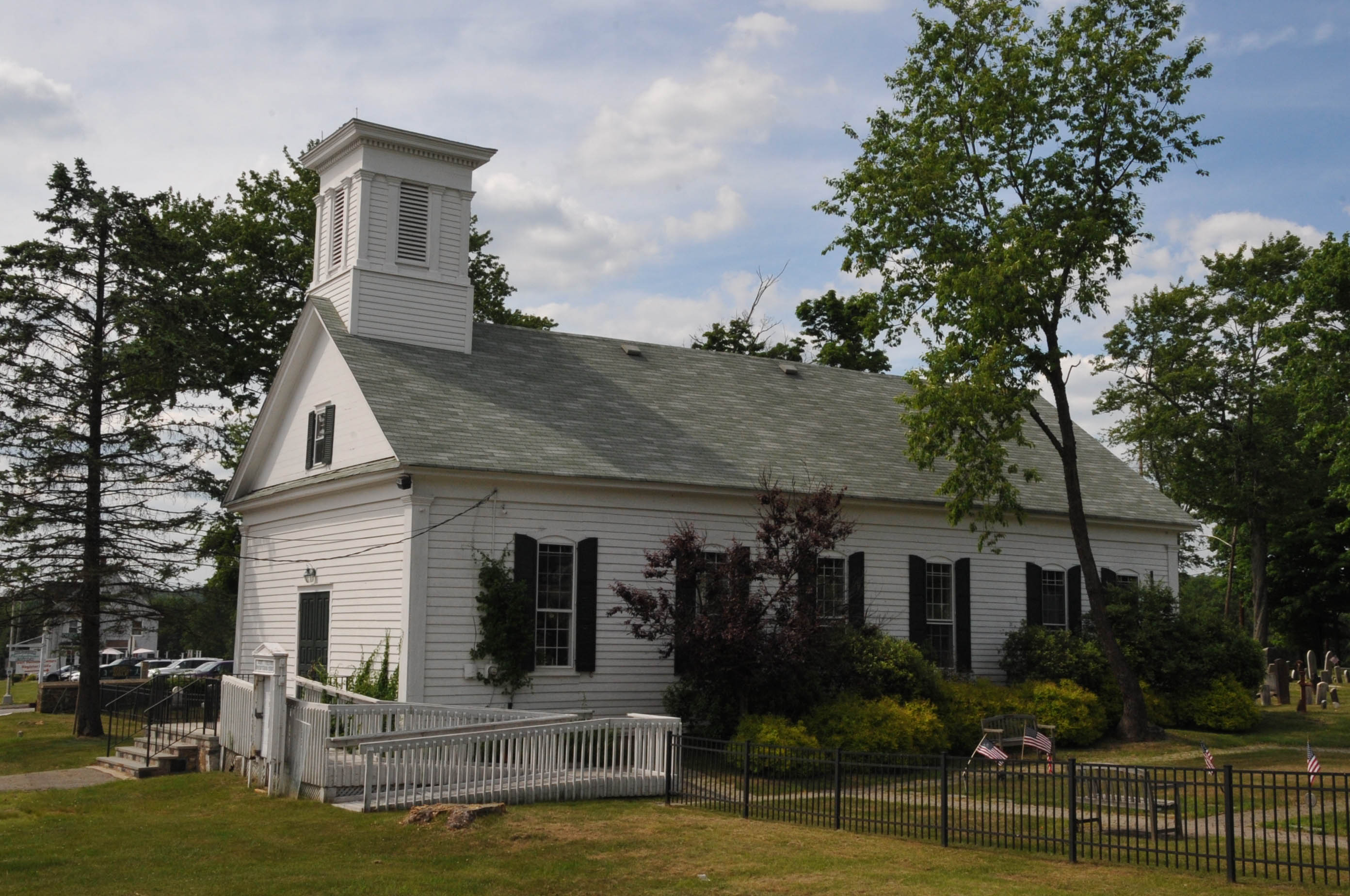

- Location within Morris County, New Jersey Location within New Jersey Location within the United States
- Location: Jct. of Sussex Tpk. and Church Rd., Randolph Township, Mount Freedom, New Jersey
- Coordinates: 40°49′38″N 74°34′56″W
- Area: 7.2 acres (2.9 ha)
- Built: 1868
- Architectural style: Mid 19th Century Revival, East Jersey cottage
- NRHP reference No.: 91001484
- Added to NRHP: October 11, 1991

Mount Freedom Presbyterian Church is a historic Christian house of worship affiliated with the Presbyterian Church (U.S.A.) and located at the intersection of Sussex Turnpike and Church Road in the Mount Freedom section of Randolph Township in Morris County, New Jersey, United States. This congregation was overseen by the Presbytery of Newton. This church was closed for a few years. It is now Faithfulness Church, a Chinese Protestant Church.

The church building was built in 1868 and added to the National Register of Historic Places in 1991.
