= Schooley =

Schooley may refer to:

== People ==
- Bob Schooley, American television producer
- Derek Schooley (born 1970), American hockey player
- Roy Schooley (1880–1933), Canadian-American hockey referee

== Places ==
- Schooley, Ohio, a community in the United States
- Schooley's Mountain, a mountain ridge in New Jersey
- Schooley's Mountain, New Jersey, a community in New Jersey
  - Schooley's Mountain Historic District, listed on the NRHP in Morris County, New Jersey

== See also ==
- Schoolies (disambiguation)
- School (disambiguation)
