= Scholar (ship) =

Scholar has been the name of several ships:

- Scholar (1886), a cargo ship of the Harrison Line built in 1886
- Scholar (1922), a cargo ship of the Harrison Line built in 1922
  sunk by the U-boat U-100 while convoying with HX 72 in 1940 at (55°11'N,17°58'W)
- Scholar (1944), a cargo ship of the Harrison Line built in 1944
  this Liberty ship was Samidway prior to 1947, and name changed in 1964 to Konstantinos Yemelos
- Scholar (1954), a cargo ship of the Harrison Line built in 1954
  was Cunard's Samaria prior to 1969 and after 1979 became Steel Trader

== See also ==
- The Scholar Ship, an academic programme run by Royal Caribbean aboard cruise ships
  - MV Oceanic II, the "ScholarShip" aboard which the programme was run
- Ship's scholar, the naturalist-aboard-ship during the Age of Exploration, see naturalist
- Scholar (disambiguation)
