= Schooler =

Schooler is a term used to identify people by their level of education. It may also refer to:

- Student, a school pupil
- Teacher, someone who schools pupils

== People ==
- Aaron Schooler (born 1985), Canadian cyclo-cross cyclist
- Brenden Schooler (born 1997), American football player
- Carmi Schooler (1933–2018), American psychologist
- Colin Schooler (born 1999), American football player
- Eve Schooler, American computer scientist
- Jonathan Schooler (born 1959), American professor and son of Carmi
- Nina Schooler (born 1934), American psychiatrist, widow of Carmi, and mother of Jonathan
- Mike Schooler (born 1962), American baseball player

== Other uses ==
- Schooler Creek Group, a stratigraphical unit of Ladinian to Norian age in the Western Canadian Sedimentary Basin.

== See also ==
- School (disambiguation)
- Scholar (disambiguation)
