= Schooling (disambiguation) =

Schooling is the use of schools in education

Schooling may also refer to:

- Education or teaching
- Shoaling and schooling of fish
- Schooling (surname), a surname and people by that name
- Schooling bannerfish (Heniochus diphreutes)
- "Schooling" (Not Going Out), a 2019 television episode

== See also ==
- Unschooling, an educational philosophy and method
- Micro-schooling in education
- Homeschooling in education
- School (disambiguation)
