= Verbal overshadowing =

Verbal overshadowing is a phenomenon where giving a verbal description of sensory input impairs formation of memories of that input. This was first reported by Schooler and Engstler-Schooler (1990) where it was shown that the effects can be observed across multiple domains of cognition which are known to rely on non-verbal knowledge and perceptual expertise. One example of this is memory, which has been known to be influenced by language. Seminal work by Carmichael and collaborators (1932) demonstrated that when verbal labels are connected to non-verbal forms during an individual's encoding process, it could potentially bias the way those forms are reproduced. Because of this, memory performance relying on reportable aspects of memory that encode visual forms should be vulnerable to the effects of verbalization.

== Initial findings ==
Schooler and Engstler-Schooler (1990) were the first to report findings of verbal overshadowing. In their study, participants watched a video of a simulated robbery and were instructed to either verbally describe the robber or engage in a control task. Those who engaged in giving a verbal description were less likely to correctly identify the robber from a test lineup, compared to those who engaged in the control task. A larger effect was detected when the verbal description was provided 20, rather than 5, minutes after the video, and immediately before the test lineup. A meta-analysis by Meissner and Brigham (2001) supported the effects of verbal overshadowing, showing a small but reliably negative effect.

== General effects of verbal overshadowing ==
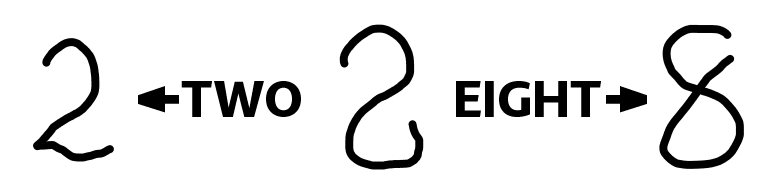
Example of experiment by Carmichael et al. (1932)

The effects of verbal overshadowing have been generalized across multiple domains of cognition that are known to rely on non-verbal knowledge and perceptual expertise, such as memory. Memory has been known to be influenced by language. Seminal work by Carmichael and collaborators (1932) demonstrated that labels attached to, or associated with, non-verbal forms during memory encoding can affect the way the forms were subsequently reproduced. Because of this, memory performance that relies on reportable aspects of memory that encode visual forms should be vulnerable to the effects of verbalization. Pelizzon, Brandimonte, and Luccio (2002) found that visual memory representations appear to incorporate visual, spatial, and temporal characteristics. It is explained as follows:

With the temporal code (where the only information available is the sequence of the stimuli), performance levels remain high, unless participants are required to retrieve the stimuli in a different order from that used at encoding (visual cue). In this case, performance is significantly impaired, even in the presence of a visual cue. The study showed that order information acts as a link between the two separate representations of figure and background, hence preventing verbal overshadowing at encoding (temporal component) or attenuating its influence at retrieval (spatial component).(p. 960)

Hatano, Ueno, Kitagami, and Kawaguchi found that verbal overshadowing is likely to occur when participants verbally described targets in detail. Detailed verbal descriptions resulted in more frequently inaccurate descriptions that in turn created inaccurate representations in the memories of participants. Inaccuracies are also likely to occur when face recognition comes immediately after verbalization. Other forms of non-verbal knowledge affected by verbal overshadowing include the following:

[Verbal overshadowing] has also been observed when participants attempt to generate descriptions of other 'difficult-to-describe' stimuli such as colors (Schooler and Engstler-Schooler, 1990) or abstract figures (Brandimonte et al., 1997), or other non-visual tasks such as wine tasting (Melcher and Schooler, 1996), decision making (Wilson and Schooler, 1991), and insight problem-solving. (p. 871) (Schooler et al., 1993)

Verbalization of stimuli leads to the disruption of non-reportable processes that are necessary for achieving insight solutions, which are distinct from language processes. Schooler, Ohlsson, and Brooks (1993) found that face recognition requires information that cannot be adequately verbalized, giving rise to difficulty in describing factors in recognition judgments. Subjects were less effective in solving insight problems when compelled to put their thoughts in words, which suggests that language may interfere with thought.

The verbal overshadowing effect was not seen when participants engaged in articulatory suppression. Performance was reduced in both the verbal and non-verbal description conditions. This is evidence that verbal encoding plays a role in face recognition.

By testing with distracting faces presented between study and test, Lloyd-Jones and Brown (2008) suggested a dual-process approach to recognition memory took place, that verbalization influenced familiarity-based processes at first, but its effects were later seen on recollection, when discrimination between items became more difficult.

== Verbal overshadowing in facial recognition ==
The verbal overshadowing effect can be found for facial recognition because faces are predominately processed in a holistic or configurable manner. (Tanaka & Farah, 1993; Tanaka & Sengco, 1997) Verbalizing one's memory for a face is done using a featural or analytic strategy, leading to a drift from the configurable information about the face and to impaired recognition performance. However, Fallshore & Schooler (1995) found that the verbal overshadowing effect was not found when participants described faces of races different from their own.

A study by Brown and Lloyd-Jones (2003) found that there was no verbal overshadowing effect found in car descriptions; it was only seen in facial descriptions. The authors noted that descriptions were no different on any measure including accuracy. It is suggested that less expertise in verbalizing faces rather than cars invokes a stronger shift in verbal and featural processing. This supports the concept of a transfer inappropriate retrieval framework and addresses some limitations of the effect.

Wickham and Swift (2006) suggested that the verbal overshadowing effect is not seen in describing all faces, and one aspect that determines this is distinctiveness. Results showed that typical faces produce verbal overshadowing, while distinctive faces did not. In studies of eyewitness reports, variation in response criteria given by participants influenced the quality of the descriptions generated and accuracy on identification task, known as the retrieval-based effect.

Face recognition was also impaired when subjects described a familiar face, such as a parent, or when describing a previously seen but novel face. Dodson, Johnson, and Schooler (1997) found that recognition was also impaired when participants were provided with a description of a previously seen face, and they were able to ignore provided versus self-generated descriptions more easily. This finding of verbal overshadowing suggested that eyewitness recognition is not only affected by their own descriptions, but of descriptions heard from others, such other eyewitness testimonies.

== Voice recognition ==
The verbal overshadowing effect has also been found to affect voice identification. Research shows that describing a non-verbal stimuli leads to a decrease in recognition accuracy. In an unpublished study by Schooler, Fiore, Melcher, and Ambadar (1996), participants listened to a tape-recorded voice, after which they were asked either to verbally describe it or to not do so, and then asked to distinguish the voice from 3 similar distractor voices. The results showed that verbal overshadowing impaired accuracy of recognition based on gut feeling, suggesting an overall verbal overshadowing for voice recognition.

Due to the forensic relevance of voices heard over the telephone and harassing phone calls that are often a problem for police, Perfect, Hunt, and Harris (2002) examined the influence of three factors on accuracy and confidence in voice recognition from a line-up. They expected to find an effect, because voice represents a class of stimuli that is difficult to describe verbally. This meets Schooler et al.'s (1997) modality mismatch criterion, meaning that describing the speakers age, gender, or accent is difficult, making voice recognition susceptible to the verbal overshadowing phenomenon. It was found that the method of memory encoding had no impact on performance, and that hearing a telephone voice reduced confidence but did not affect accuracy.

They also found that providing a verbal description impaired accuracy but had no effect on confidence. The data showed an effect of verbal overshadowing in voice recognition and provided yet another disassociation between confidence and performance. Although there was a difference in confidence level, witnesses were able to identify voices over the telephone as accurately as voices heard directly. The authors stated, "This effect is useful in the respect that it demonstrates that the lack of a confidence effect with verbal overshadowing is not due to low sensitivity of the confidence measure". (p. 979) The data from the study suggested that the main effect of verbal overshadowing was seen mainly in the telephone voices. They also stated, "However, because of the statistical limitations, it is perhaps best not to over-interpret this finding until it is replicated in a larger sample". (P.979)

Perfect, Hunt, and Harris (2002) did a small-scale study that showed a reliable verbal overshadowing effect on voice identification, thus confirming previous research that showed verbally describing a to-be-recognized (non-verbal) stimulus leads to decrease in recognition accuracy without reducing confidence. This disassociation between performance and confidence offers scope to test theoretical accounts of the verbal overshadowing phenomena, and it is an issue that has been neglected so far. A more recent study by Wilson, Seale-Carlisle, and Mickes (2017) found that confidence is predictive of accuracy in verbal overshadowing. They found that high confidence identifications are lower in accuracy compared to what was observed in the lineups. Other results from their study concluded that police should encourage reporting crimes immediately and take down descriptions of perpetrators as soon as possible in order to reduce the effects of verbal overshadowing.

== Recognition criteria ==
The verbal overshadowing effect may effect changes in recognition criteria rather than in processing style or underlying memory. One explanation for the effect is based on a shift in a person's recognition criteria, or increased hesitancy in choosing someone from a lineup. Verbalization leads witnesses to use more precise or exact recognition criteria, therefore lowering identification rates, the phenomena can be captured by a shift in recognition criteria.

Placement of recognition criteria affects performance. With conservative criteria, people are unwilling to identify anyone in a lineup, but with liberal criteria, identification rates are greater. The criterion effect is persistent and known to play a large part in recognition paradigms that allow voluntary responses, moreso when there is a tradeoff between quantity and accuracy. However, with the criterion effect controlled, confidence and perceived difficulty cannot account for the effects of verbalization.

The verbal overshadowing effect is caused by strict recognition criteria that only affect identification rates when a "not present" response is possible. Clare and Lewandowsky (2004) found that verbalization can have a positive effect on identification. Although resulting in fewer correct identifications from lineups, it also reduced the number of false identification rates within lineups. Because of this, verbalization may protect innocent suspects from being falsely identified as perpetrators, suggesting that not all effects of verbalization on eyewitnesses are bad.

With the standard description instructions in place, verbal overshadowing occurs because people have become more reluctant to identify someone from a lineup after they provide a description of the perpetrator. The criterion-effect explanation is one that accounts for a large verbal overshadowing effect in optional lineups, the absence of a verbal overshadowing effect with forced choice identification, and the advantageous effect of verbalization with optional-choice lineups.

== Retrieval-based interference theory ==
Some researchers (e.g. Hunt and Carroll, Clare and Lewandowsky) hypothesize that verbal overshadowing is caused by retrieval-based interference, which is a change to the original memory trace made during verbalization of the given memory. Verbalizing of a non-verbal stimulus brings a verbal memory representation of that stimulus. When tested, this interferes with the original perceptual memory representation on which accurate recognition performance depends. The content of verbalization influences the outcome of identification by retroactively interfering with the original memory trace.

Studies have found that when participants were forced to provide detailed descriptions of perpetrators, even if this involved guessing, a larger verbal overshadowing effect resulted than when they were discouraged from guessing. The inaccuracy is thought to be caused by descriptions interfering with the earlier memory. Finger and Pezdek (1999) took this as a retroactive interference effect on memory, caused by higher verbalization when participants completed a complicated rather than an easy task. Meissner and Brigham (2001) showed that when participants were allowed to guess when forced to provide a detailed description of a robber, the size of the verbal overshadowing effect was greater than when they were discouraged from guessing.

Verbalization interfered with performance on new and familiar faces, but it did not interfere with priming. They argued that verbalization encouraged a long-lasting shift toward greater visual processing of individual facial features at the expense of more global visual processing (which is, for the most part, beneficial in recognition of faces and important for discriminating faces from non-faces in the face-decision task. Verbally describing a visual memory of a face can interfere with subsequent visual recognition of that face.

Retrieval-based interference has been challenged by several findings and by the fact that verbal overshadowing can have an effect on description beyond a specific face, to other, undescribed faces.

== Recoding interference hypothesis ==
According to the recoding interference hypothesis, verbalizing non-verbal memory makes the visual representations less accurate. The recoding interference hypothesis predicts that verbal overshadowing will occur more readily if participants generate less accurate verbal descriptions. A computational model detected core processing principles of the recoding interference hypothesis to simulate facial recognition, and it reproduced these behavioral phenomena as well as verbal overshadowing, providing an account as to why target description accuracy does not linearly predict recognition accuracy. The study addressed the replicability issues in verbal overshadowing. Hatano et al. (2015) stated:

Our hypothesis is that this is due to (a) the use of single-trial testing methods, (b) individual differences, and (c) relatively uncontrolled extraneous variables (e.g., how many distinctive facial features the target and distractors share). (p. 4)

The study found that verbalization changed the nature of representations, rather than shifting the types of processing. Then, this recoded representation was used for (or affected) subsequent visual recognition and resulted in a failure in computing item-specific information. The phenomena from the study are predictable from the recoding interference hypothesis. It is explained as follows by the authors:

… by verbalizing irrelevant information (e.g., non-target face), the network settles down into an attractor that captures information ir- relevant to the target face. That is, given that the attractor states in the hidden layer captured the visual similarity of inputs, the resultant internal representation by verbalization was dissimilar from that required for recognition of the target face. As a result, the network was captured by a distant attractor state, and it was difficult to travel into the correct attractor basin in order to compute target-specific information. Thus, verbalization induces noise in the hidden layer activities. In such a situation, the "old" items lose an advantage of training, and the resultant polarity distributions for the "old" and "new" items overlap to a greater extent, thereby reducing the "old"/"new" judgment accuracy". (p.16-17)

The researchers found that generated verbal descriptions affected not just the polarity (familiarity) values of "old" items but also those of "new" items, as a function of how accurately the descriptions captured the distractor faces. This was the reason why target-description accuracy in isolation does not necessarily predict the effect of verbal overshadowing in a linear fashion. The model links verbal and visual code as in the face-recognition model. Verbal descriptions predicted recognition impairment and indicated that theory about interference in the memory domain is potentially useful when discussing the verbalization effect on non-verbal recognition. The study also noted that it did not consider whether this account can be extended to the visual-imagery domain beyond facial recognition.

Brandimonte and Collina (2008) conducted three experiments that support a retrieval based, recording-interference explanation of verbal overshadowing. They found that the effects of verbal overshadowing can be attenuated by reactivating featural aspects of a stimulus, with any cues that trigger the activation of featural representations.

== Transfer inappropriate retrieval hypothesis ==
The transfer inappropriate retrieval (TIR) hypothesis states that activation of the verbal processes needed for a description stops the following application of nonverbal face recognition processes without changing the memory of the perpetrator. TIR theory does not expect the accuracy of verbalization to be related to accuracy of identification. All that is required for verbal overshadowing to happen is the act of verbalizing, to put a description into words, which produces an expected processing shift to an inappropriate style. This explains the generalization of interference to non-described faces as well as to described ones.

The TIR hypothesis assumes the original memory trace of the target remains and becomes temporarily inaccessible, rather than being permanently changed by verbalization. Verbalization leads cognitive processing to an inappropriate style, which stops retrieval of the non-verbal information needed for facial recognition. Verbal overshadowing comes solely because "verbalization indices inappropriate processing operations which area incommensurate with the processes required for successful recognition performance, that is, there is a transfer inappropriate processing shift". A shift is not tied to a particular item that has been previously coded, but rather generalizes to new stimuli that have not been encountered before.

It is proposed that verbalization requires a shift to verbal processing, and this shift obstructs the application of non-verbal (face-specific) processing in the following face recognition test. The key difference from other hypotheses is whether an operation-specific representation is postulated or not.

Also referred to as the processing shift account, TIR proposes that verbal overshadowing does not comes from conflicting representations, but from the effect that verbal description has in leading participants to switch from an appropriate to an inappropriate mode of processing, which carries over to the recognition test. Hunt and Carroll (2008) reported results supporting this interpretation. They found that,

[...] participants who described the face and then imagined their life in the near or proximal future were markedly less accurate in their later identification of the face compared to proximal imagining participants who did not describe the face beforehand. As predicted, participants who imagined their proximal future subsequent to describing the face suffered greater impairment to face recognition memory, relative to both those who imagined their distal future and to the no-imagining control group. In contrast, there was no evidence of VO for the distal imagining condition, with those participants who described the face not showing a significantly poorer level of accuracy when compared to those who did not describe the face". (p. 91)

According to this hypothesis, participants in the proximal imagining condition were more impaired because they encoded the target face at first using a holistic, non-verbal, and non-analytic process. After, a switch was made to explicit, analytic processing, to write or verbalize their description. They then failed to revert to critical non-verbal, holistic mode, which is more effective in making a recognition decision. Contrary to that, participants in the distal imagining condition experienced less disruption from having verbalized the faces prior to the recognition test, adopting instead a distal time perspective, which is known to facilitate abstract or holistic thinking. (Forster et al., 2004) The study found a verbal overshadowing effect when participants were forced to engage in extensive verbalization by making them fill out a blank, lined page with a description of the previously seen face. This effect was not observed when participants were not forced to engage in this extensive verbalization. This suggested that prevention of verbal overshadowing in real life situations can be effected with a manipulation, such as encouraging global thinking.

Consistent with TIR, a study by Dehon, Vanootighem, and Bredart (2013) showed the absence of correlation between descriptor accuracy, vocabulary performance, and correct identification. Neither quality nor quantity of descriptors affected identification accuracy, which was only impacted by the act of verbally describing a face. The results held for the immediate test condition, "post-encoding delay", consistent with the hypothesis. This suggested that the content of description is irrelevant and that the verbal overshadowing effect occurred due to a shift in featural processing caused by the verbalization, thus supporting the TIR.

Westerman and Larsen (1997) suggested that verbal overshadowing effects are more pervasive that initially believed. They showed that verbal description can impair face recognition when the described object is not the recognition target. This extends findings from Dodson et al. (1997) to a situation where face recognition is impaired by the description of a non-face object. Consistent with TIR, this points to a general shift in face-recognition processing as a result of producing a description of any object.

Some problems with this theory are that identification accuracy can be affected even if no retrieval operations are involved and that unrelated nonverbal processes can alleviate the effect of verbalization on identification.

== Signal detection theory ==
Signal detection theory views impaired recognition as caused by a reduced ability to discriminate, that reduced discriminability in test suspects is a consequence of describing the robber or perpetrator.

== Who is susceptible? ==
The verbal overshadowing effect on face identification was found in children as well as adults, with neither accuracy of description, delay, nor target presence in lineup being found to be associated with accuracy. Age increased the number of accurate descriptors produced but not incorrect ones, suggesting that children produce less detailed but not less accurate descriptions than adults. This study holds for 7-8, 10-11, and 13-14 year olds. Further research is needed to detect under which conditions this phenomenon may hold, even in more "ecologically valid" situations.

Older adults have been found to be less affected than young adults by the verbal overshadowing effect. In a study similar to Schooler et al. (1990), Kinlen, Adams-Price, and Henley (2007) showed the following:

The results indicated that the older adults were better at recognizing the criminal when a recognition measure taking confidence into account was employed. The results also indicated that older adults were more accurate than young adults in the facial description condition only, suggesting that they were less affected by verbal overshadowing". (p.976-977)

The findings suggested that verbal expertise, as seen in older adults, may decrease effects of verbal overshadowing in a face recognition task.

== See also ==
- Articulatory suppression
- Cognitive interview
- Decline effect
