= Floating University =

Floating University may refer to:

- Flying University, Uniwersytet Latający, sometimes also translated "Floating University"
- Oceanic II (ship), an ocean liner being refitted for use as ocean-going educational vessel
