= Oak Cottage =

- U.S. Historic district – Contributing property
- Location within Morris County, New Jersey Location within New Jersey Location within the United States
- Location: Schooley's Mountain, New Jersey
- Coordinates: 40°48′8″N 74°49′7″W
- Part of: Schooley's Mountain Historic District (ID91000677)
- Added to NRHP: June 14, 1991

Oak Cottage is a historic home built around 1820 and located in the Schooley's Mountain section of Washington Township in Morris County, New Jersey. The property includes a mill and carriage house built in 1828 and is a contributing property to Schooley's Mountain Historic District, which was listed on the National Register of Historic Places in 1991.

== History ==
Oak Cottage is a three-story home constructed as a 'General Grant' or Second Empire style Victorian with a Mansard roof. The home has 13 rooms including 6 bedrooms and 4 bathrooms.

The carriage house and mill on the property was used as an 'apple cider distillery'. It was constructed while the home was owned by Ephraim Marsh and was powered by a water wheel. Marsh was a hotel owner, judge, and president of the Morris Canal.

A historic photo of the home in 1908 can be seen in a photograph from The Roads Home by Henry Charlton Beck and in its 2008 real estate ad. The property was for sale in 2008.

The home was nicknamed 'The Gem of the Mountain' and was located in an area of health resorts, due in part to the local mineral springs. There were several large hotels with more than 300 rooms. Many prominent Americans visited the area including Thomas Edison, Vice President George Dallas, Governor Edward Coles, General J. Chadwalader, Governor William Pennington, E.D. Morgan, the Vanderbilts, C.V.S. Roosevelt and Ulysses S. Grant.
