= Decline effect =

The decline effect may occur when scientific claims receive decreasing support over time. The term was first described by parapsychologist Joseph Banks Rhine in the 1930s to describe the disappearance of extrasensory perception (ESP) psychic experiments conducted by Rhine over time. More generally, Cronbach, in his review article "Beyond the two disciplines of scientific psychology" referred to the phenomenon as "generalizations decay." The term was once again used in a 2010 article by Jonah Lehrer published in The New Yorker.

== Examples ==
In his article, Lehrer gives several examples where the decline effect is allegedly showing. In the first example, the development of second generation anti-psychotic drugs, reveals that the first tests had demonstrated a dramatic decrease in the subjects' psychiatric symptoms. However, after repeating tests this effect declined and in the end it was not possible to document that these drugs had any better effect than the first generation anti-psychotics.

A well-known example of the decline effect can be seen in early experiments conducted by Professor Jonathan Schooler examining the effects of verbalization on non-verbal cognition. In an initial series of studies Schooler found evidence that verbal rehearsal of previously seen faces or colors markedly impaired subsequent recognition. This phenomenon is referred to as verbal overshadowing. Although verbal overshadowing effects have been repeatedly observed by Schooler, as well as other researchers, they have also proven to be somewhat challenging to replicate. Verbal overshadowing effects in a variety of domains were initially easy to find, but then became increasingly difficult to replicate indicating a decline effect in the phenomenon. Schooler has now become one of the more prominent researchers examining the decline effect. He has argued that addressing the decline effect may require a major revision to the scientific process whereby scientists log their protocols before conducting their research and then, regardless of outcome, report their findings in an open access repository (such as Brian Nosek's "Project Implicit"). Schooler is currently working with the Fetzer Foundation to organize a major meeting of scientists from various disciplines to consider alternative accounts of the decline effect and approaches for rigorously addressing it.

In 1991, Danish zoologist Anders Møller discovered a connection between symmetry and sexual preference of female birds in nature. This sparked a huge interest in the topic and a lot of follow-up research was published. In three years following the original discovery, 90% of studies confirmed Møller's hypothesis. However, the same outcome was published in just four out of eight research papers in 1995, and only a third in next three years.

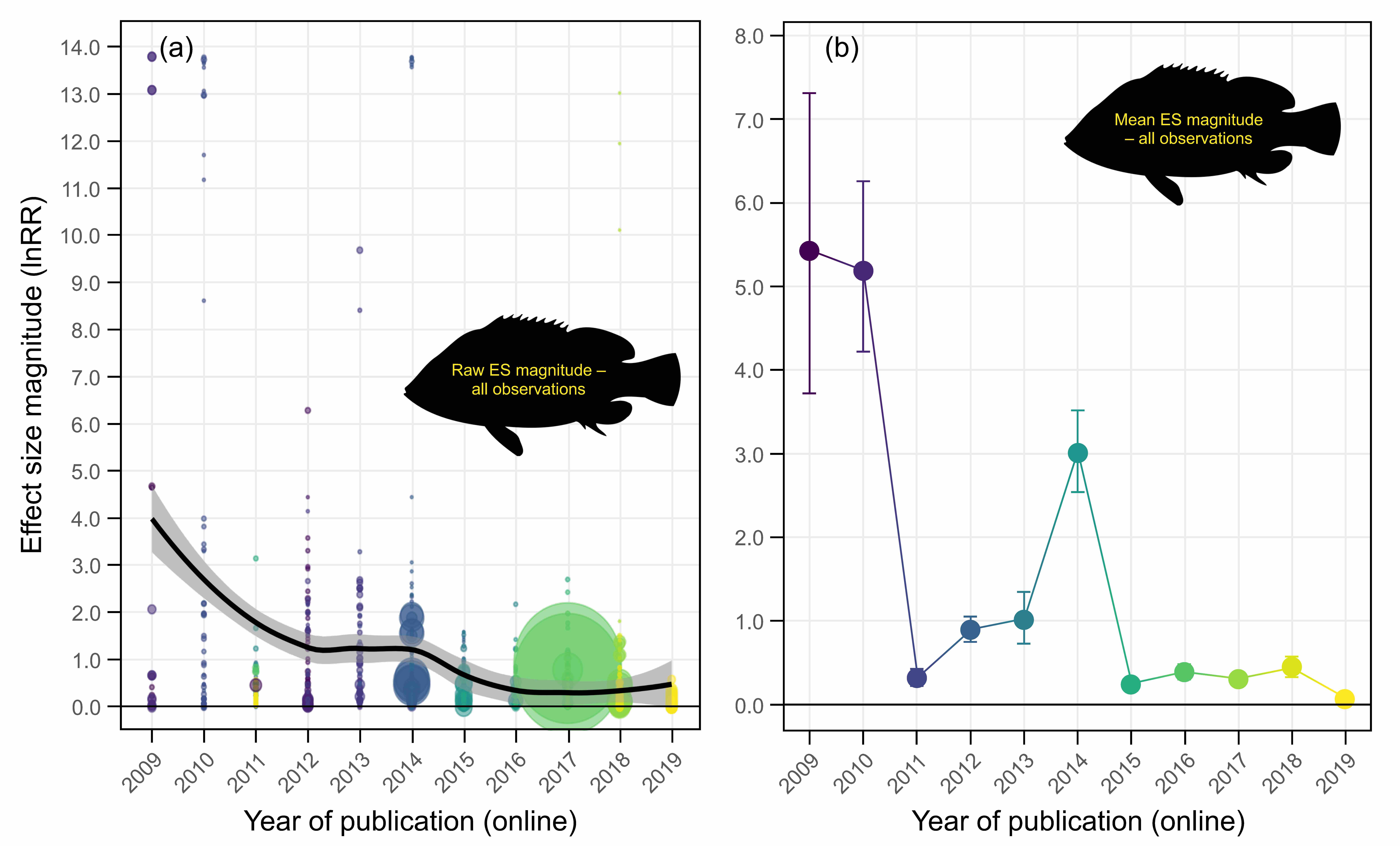
The decline effect in ocean acidification effects on fish behavior. The strength of effect declined by an order of magnitude over a decade of research on this topic. The decline effect in this field appears to be driven by publication bias, citation bas, sample sizes, and particular investigators publishing large effect sizes.

A study published in 2022 reported perhaps one of the most striking examples of the decline effect in the field of ecology, where effect sizes of published studies testing for ocean acidification effects on fish behavior have declined by an order of magnitude over a decade of research on this topic.

== Explanations ==
The decline effect has different types, each with different causes.

=== False positive ===
If the initial publication is a false positive, i.e. the null hypothesis is true, but the initial publication mistakenly rejected it, then subsequent attempts at replication would necessarily discover that the effect size is not significantly different from zero. This is the simplest type of decline effect.

For example, statistically significant phenomena in parapsychology are false positives, and so is facilitated communication. The estimated effects of these phenomena become closer to zero with more experimental data, giving a decline effect.

=== Under-specification ===
If the initial publication discovered a genuine effect, but did not identify certain relevant variables, then the effect size might be smaller.

Concretely, consider this example. The effect $Y$ depends on $X, Z$ according to $Y = X + Z + \epsilon$ where $\epsilon \sim \mathcal N(0, 1)$ is a standard gaussian noise. Suppose in the initial publication, due to the experiment setup, $Z = X$, so the initial publication mistakenly thought that $Y = 2X + \epsilon$.

In an attempt at replication, the uncontrolled variable $Z$ no longer correlates with $X$, but varies independently according to $Z \sim \mathcal N(0, 1)$. Now, the replication discovers that $Y = X + \epsilon'$ where $\epsilon' \sim \mathcal N(0, 2)$. Thus, the regression coefficient of $Y$ over $X$ declined 50%.

A real example is the drug Timolol for treating glaucoma. Its effect has steadily decreased. This was explained by noting that the early studies used patients with advanced glaucoma, while later studies used less advanced patients. Because less sick patients has less room for improvement, the effect size of Timolol decreased.

=== Regression to the mean ===
One of the explanations of the effect is regression toward the mean, also known as "inflated decline". This is a statistical phenomenon happening when a variable is extreme on the first experiments and by later experiments tend to regress towards average, although this does not explain why sequential results decline in a linear fashion, rather than fluctuating about the true mean as would be expected.

This is particularly likely when the initial study was stopped early when "the effect size is clearly large enough". If one stops the data collection as soon as the effect size is above a threshold that is higher than the true effect size, then subsequent replications will necessarily regress to the mean.

=== Underpowered studies ===
Interaction between sample size, effect size, and statistical power. Distributions of sample means under the null (θ=0) and alternative hypotheses are shown. The shaded red area represents significance (α), held constant at 0.05, while the shaded green area represents statistical power (1-β). As the sample size increases, the distributions narrow, leading to clearer separation between the hypotheses and higher power. Similarly, a larger effect size increases the distance between the distributions, resulting in greater power.

If the true effect size is small, but the initial study has low power (i.e., small sample size), then the null hypothesis will only be rejected if the effect estimate is far from zero, as illustrated in the figure. This means that subsequent replications, with larger sample sizes, will discover effect estimates that are closer to the true effect, which is closer to zero than the initial estimate.

=== Publication bias ===
Another reason may be the publication bias: scientists and scientific journals prefer to publish positive results of experiments and tests over null results, especially with new ideas. As a result, the journals may refuse to publish papers that do not prove that the idea works. Later, when an idea is accepted, journals may refuse to publish papers that support it.

=== Experimenter effect ===
In the debate that followed the original article, Lehrer answered some of the questions by claiming that scientific observations might be shaped by one's expectations and desires, sometimes even unconsciously, thus creating a bias towards the desired outcome. This is known as the experimenter effect. For example, in parapsychology, the "experimenter effect" is used to explain how an experimenter who does not believe in psi would discover no evidence for psi, while the same experiment would when performed by an experimenter who does believe in psi.

A significant factor contributing to the decline effect can also be the sample size of the scientific research, since smaller sample size is very likely to give more extreme results, suggesting a significant breakthrough, but also a higher probability of an error. Typical examples of this effect are the opinion polls, where those including a larger number of people are closer to reality than those with a small pool of respondents. This suggestion would not appear to account for the observed decrease over time regardless of sample size. Researcher John Ioannidis offers some explanation. He states that early research is usually small and more prone to highly positive results supporting the original idea, including early confirmatory studies. Later, as larger studies are being made, they often show regression to the mean and a failure to repeat the early exaggerated results.

=== Genuine decline ===
A 2012 report by National Public Radio's show "On The Media" covered scientists who are exploring another option: that the act of observing the universe changes the universe, and that repeated measurement might actually be rendering earlier results invalid. In other words, antipsychotic drugs did work originally, but the more we measured their effectiveness, the more the laws governing those drugs changed so they ceased to be effective. Science fiction author Geoff Ryman explores this idea and its possible ramifications further in his 2012 short story What We Found, which won the Nebula Award for Best Novelette in 2012.

Another reason for some decline effects may be that certain researchers tend to publish larger effect sizes than others. For example, alongside publication bias and sample size effects, the decline effect in ocean acidification effects on fish behavior was largely driven by outstanding effect sizes reported by two particular investigators from the same laboratory who are currently under investigation for potential scientific misconduct and data fabrication.

== Contesting views ==
Several commenters have contested Jonah Lehrer's view of the decline effect being a problematic side of the phenomenon, as presented in his New Yorker article. "The decline effect is troubling because it reminds us how difficult it is to prove anything. We like to pretend that our experiments define the truth for us. But that's often not the case. Just because an idea is true doesn't mean it can be proved. And just because an idea can be proved doesn't mean it's true. When the experiments are done, we still have to choose what to believe."

Steven Novella also challenges Lehrer's view of the decline effect, arguing that Lehrer is concentrating on new discoveries on the cutting edge of scientific research and applying the conclusions to all areas of science. Novella points out that most of the examples used by Lehrer come from medicine, psychology and ecology, scientific fields most influenced by a complex human aspect and that there is not much evidence of the decline effect in other areas of science, such as physics.

Another scientist, Paul Zachary Myers, is also contesting Lehrer's view on the decline effect being a surprising phenomenon in science, claiming that: "This isn't surprising at all. It's what we expect, and there are many very good reasons for the shift."

Lehrer's statements about the difficulty of proving anything and publication bias find support from Jerry A. Coyne. Coyne holds that in the fields of genetics and evolutionary biology, almost no research is replicated and there is a premium motivation offered for publishing positive results of research studies. However, he also contests Lehrer's approach of applying conclusions on all fields of science, stating that in physics, chemistry or molecular biology, previous results are constantly repeated by others in order to progress in their own research.

== Criticism ==
One concern that some have expressed is that Lehrer's article may further fuel people's skepticism about academic science. It was long believed that Lehrer's article originally hinted that academic science is not as rigid as people would like to believe. It is especially the article's ending that has upset many scientists and led to broad criticism of the article. Lehrer ends the article by saying: "Just because an idea is true doesn't mean it can be proved. And just because an idea can be proved doesn't mean it's true. When the experiments are done, we still have to choose what to believe." This has upset scientists in the scientific community. Many have written back to Lehrer and questioned his agenda. Some have characterized Lehrer's assertion as "absurd", while others claiming that Lehrer is trying to use publication bias as an excuse for not believing in anything.

As an answer to the many comments Lehrer received upon publishing the article, Lehrer published a comment on his blog, The Frontal Cortex, where he denied that he was implicitly questioning science and scientific methods in any way. In the same blog comment, Lehrer stated that he was not questioning fundamental scientific theories such as the theory of evolution by natural selection and global warming by calling them "two of the most robust and widely tested theories of modern science".

A further clarification was published as a follow-up note in The New Yorker. In this note, entitled "More Thoughts on the Decline Effect", Lehrer tries mainly to answer the critics by giving examples where scientific research has both failed and succeeded. As an example, Lehrer uses Richard Feynman's commencement speech at Caltech in 1974 as a starting point. In his commencement speech, Feynman used Robert Millikan's and Harvey Fletcher's oil drop experiment to measure the charge of an electron to illustrate how selective reporting can bias scientific results. On the other hand, Feynman finds solace in the fact that other scientists will repeat other scientists' experiments and hence, the truth will win out in the end.

Lehrer once again uses the follow-up note to deny that his original intention was to support people denying well verified scientific theories such as natural selection and climate change. Instead, he wishes that "we'd spend more time considering the value of second-generation antipsychotics or the verity of the latest gene-association study". In the other parts of the follow-up note, Lehrer briefly discusses some of the creative feedback he has received in order to reduce publication bias. He does not give explicit support to any specific idea. The follow-up article ends with Lehrer once again stating that the decline effect is a problem in today's science, but that science will eventually find a tool to deal with the problem.

== See also ==
- Cargo cult science
- Hundredth monkey effect
- Replication crisis
