= Carmi Schooler =

American social psychologist (1933–2018)

- Born: 1933; The Bronx, New York City, New York
- Died: May 11, 2018 (aged 84–85)
- Education: Hamilton College; New York University
- Known for: Personality; Structural equation modeling
- Spouse: Nina Schooler (m. 1956–2018)
- Children: Jonathan Schooler; Lael Schooler
- Awards: Member of the Sociological Research Association; Fellow of the American Psychological Society
- Scientific career
- Fields: Social psychology Sociology
- Institutions: National Institute of Mental Health; University of Maryland, College Park
- Thesis: Social influence on perceptual judgments of chronic schizophrenics (1959)
- Doctoral advisor: Marie Jahoda
- Other academic advisors: Robert K. Merton

Carmi Schooler (1933 – May 11, 2018) was an American social psychologist known for his work on personality and structural equation modeling.

== Early life and education ==
Schooler was born in the Bronx, New York City, New York, in 1933. He was educated at the Bronx High School of Science and later attended Hamilton College and New York University (NYU). He received his Ph.D. from NYU in 1959 under the supervision of Marie Jahoda. Another one of his advisors in graduate school was Robert K. Merton.

== Academic career ==
Schooler began working at the National Institute of Mental Health's Socioenvironmental Studies Laboratory in 1959, and continued to work there until 2007. For his last twenty-two years there, he was the laboratory's chief. In 2007, he joined the University of Maryland, College Park, where he became a senior scientist in the Department of Sociology. He was a fellow of the American Psychological Society and a member of the Sociological Research Association. He was elected chair of the American Sociological Association's Social Psychology Section in 2003 and received their Cooley-Mead Award for Distinguished Scholarship in 2016.

== Personal life ==
Schooler married his wife, Nina, in 1956. They had two sons: Jonathan and Lael. Carmi Schooler died on May 11, 2018, at the age of 84.
