= Scholastic =

Scholastic may refer to:

- a philosopher or theologian in the tradition of scholasticism
- Scholastic (Notre Dame publication)
- Scholastic Corporation, an American publishing company of educational materials
- Scholastic Building, in New York City
- Jan I the Scholastic (14th c. AD), Duke of Oświęcim

== See also ==
- Scholar (disambiguation)
- School (disambiguation)
- Applied Scholastics, U.S. Scientology non-profit corporation
- Neo-Scholasticism (Neo-Thomism) from the methods of St. Thomas of Aquinas
- Scholarism (學民思潮) Hong Kong political movement
- Scholarly method
- Scholasticism
