= Schooled =

Schooled may refer to:

- Schooled (magazine), a monthly magazine based in Provo, Utah
- "Schooled" (Modern Family), an episode of Modern Family
- Schooled (novel), written by Gordon Korman
- Schooled (TV series), a 2019 American comedy series, direct spin-off to The Goldbergs
- "Schooled!", an episode of the animated series The Loud House

== See also ==
- School (disambiguation)
