= Articulatory suppression =

Articulatory suppression is the process of inhibiting memory performance by speaking while being presented with an item to remember. Most research demonstrates articulatory suppression by requiring an individual to repeatedly say an irrelevant speech sound out loud while being presented with a list of words to recall shortly after. The individual experiences four stages when repeating the irrelevant sound: the intention to speak, programming the speech, articulating the sound or word, and receiving auditory feedback.

== Phonological loop and visuospatial sketchpad ==
When studying articulatory suppression, many researchers examine the phonological loop and the visuospatial sketchpad as well. The phonological loop is the process of hearing information, which has direct access to one's phonological store (i.e. one's short-term memory). The visuospatial sketchpad is information that is seen (visual information), which only has access to the phonological store through one's articulatory control process (i.e. when visual information can be phonologically encoded). Essentially, articulatory suppression is related to these two topics because it is what prevents visual information from being encoded into the phonological store.

A study done by Franssen, Vandierendonck and Van Hiel which addressed the question, to what extent is phonological working memory involved in time estimation processes. Their study used irrelevant speech and articulatory suppression to test whether time estimation is affected during a task condition or phonological load. The results showed that articulatory suppression had impaired time estimation. The results from this study tell us the effects of articulatory suppression and its involvement in the phonological loop.

== Irrelevant speech ==
Much research has been done to assess the relationship between articulatory suppression and irrelevant speech. One within-groups research study in particular examined whether articulatory suppression has an effect on the ability to encode information into memory and the relationship that articulatory suppression has with the irrelevant speech effect. Irrelevant speech, in this experiment, consisted of words being played on a speaker during the study. Participants were shown seven letters in a row and then asked to repeat the order of the letters by pushing buttons on a screen. There were two phases to this study, and in Phase I, the participants were either asked to remain quiet while the letters were shown or to repeat "123" while the letters were shown. In Phase II, the irrelevant speech was either absent or played on the speakers.

Results of this study concluded that memory performance was disrupted by both articulatory suppression and irrelevant speech, although the effect of articulatory suppression was larger. This is because they inhibit or eliminate the individual's ability to rely on the auditory cues that help encode information into memory. Another reason articulatory suppression inhibits memory performance more than irrelevant speech is because it prevents information from being represented in the mind and is unable to be rehearsed. In both phases, an overwhelming majority of participants did the best when the information was encoded in the quiet trial. This information could be helpful to everyone because it lends evidence to the statement that a quiet environment is the best environment for people to learn or commit any sort of information to memory.

An additional study sought to determine what types of articulatory suppression reduce the strength of encoding items into an individual's memory. Researchers manipulated participants by engaging them in multiple kinds of articulatory suppression (i.e. some were rather easy, such as saying "the", and some were more difficult, such as spelling a word out loud) and showing them lists to remember. Results showed that articulatory suppression of any kind reduced the strength in which an individual encoded visual information into their memory. However, participants who were in the more difficult articulatory suppression group remembered much less of the list of words than did those with an easier articulatory suppression task. The reason for this finding is because if an individual is using more effort in remembering how to do something (i.e. spell a word), they are obligated to pay less attention to additional visual information that is presented at the same time.

Hanley and Shah looked at the role of irrelevant sound effect under articulatory suppression. During this experiment, participants wore stereo headphones when being tested. During the testing, participants heard an experimental list of items through the right headphone spoken by a female voice. Participants were instructed to repeat the word "the" at a rate of approximately two repetitions per second. There was a retention interval of 10 seconds between the final item and the recall of target items. Irrelevant sound took place when a male voice was spoken in the left headphone throughout the retention interval, right before the recall of items. The results from this study showed that there was a significant effect of irrelevant sound under articulatory suppression when the list items were followed by an auditory tone, but the effect was abolished when followed by a spoken suffix.

== In the real world ==
Articulatory suppression can have many relevant uses in the 'real world', especially when looking at people that are bilingual or learning a second language. Overall, researchers have found that the ability to memorize or recall anything while using articulatory suppression is significantly reduced. This is because the repeating of nonsense syllables prevents the individual from committing the information to memory. When learning languages, the ability to hear a word and then add that word to an individual's vocabulary is crucial to progressing in that language. Studies are being done to investigate the mechanism by which articulatory suppression inhibits that ability. With increased understanding of how that process works, improved learning and studying strategies may be able to be developed to help people with second languages or with other aspects of memory.

One study looked at interpreters, their impressive working memories and the effects that articulatory suppression can have on their ability to translate and interpret language. Specifically, researchers wanted to look at the differences between simultaneous interpreting and articulatory suppression as they relate to working memory. To do this, thirty Dutch university students with English as a second language participated and were read a story in English and then were asked to translate to Dutch as they listened, but only translate the meaning, not the exact words.

Then, another experiment was performed with the same participants. In this study there were two important variables that were under the control of the researcher: the articulatory suppression variable (no articulatory suppression, articulatory suppression or complex articulatory suppression) and whether the story that was read to the students was coherent or not. Participants in the articulatory suppression condition said "de, de, de" while the story was read and in the complex articulatory suppression condition, they said 'hond, kat, muis' (i.e. dog, cat, mouse) while listening to the story. After the story was read, each participant was told to recall and write down as much of the story as they could remember in exact wording.

From this study, researchers came to the conclusion that articulatory suppression inhibits the ability for the participants to recall the story, as many other studies have shown. However, interpreters are somewhat immune to the effects of articulatory suppression. This could be because interpreters are quicker to transfer information to their episodic buffer, which may allow them to bypass the rehearsal that most people find necessary to retain information. Articulatory suppression interferes with rehearsal, which is why most people show poor recall when engaging in articulatory suppression.

=== Verbal overshadowing and face identification ===
A study by Wickham & Swift looks at the role that articulatory suppression can have on verbal overshadowing and face identification. Verbal overshadowing is the phenomenon that verbally describing a face between presentation and test can impair identification of the face (Schooler & Engstler-Schooler, 1990). This study had the goal of looking to see how important verbal encoding is to face recognition and also how it interacts with verbal overshadowing by using articulatory suppression to force the individual to rely on their visual code instead of the phonological code. Participants were asked to perform a procedure that included studying a face carefully for five seconds. During these five seconds, they were repeating the word 'the'. Then, participants were either given one minute to write down a description of the face they just saw or were given a crossword puzzle to complete to distract them. Then, participants were shown ten faces, of which there were nine faces that were very similar and one face that was considered the target, or the one they just studied. This procedure was repeated twelve times for each participant. Researchers found several interesting conclusions from their study. First, they found that "articulatory suppression significantly reduced the identification scores of no description participants but not the description participants." This means that articulatory suppression has an effect on facial identification in that it impairs one's ability to recognize a face. This study also found that when participants were using articulatory suppression, the verbal overshadowing effect did not occur. This would seem to suggest that the encoding of faces and the verbal overshadowing effect comes from a problem with the verbal code, not the visual code. Because having that distracter syllable did not hinder the individual's ability to recognize the face more than describing it did, it would not be a problem with disrupting what the participants encoded visually, but the verbal aspects that interferes and creates the verbal overshadowing effect.

From these studies, it can be seen how this information can be used in everyday life to help understand and improve memory. As discussed before, the studies shown that information is best encoded when there is no auditory information to interfere with the rehearsal of the information. This could be helpful to students who like to listen to music while studying or to anyone trying to encode information. The second study suggests that the ability to simultaneously interpret language might enable individuals to bypass the effects of articulatory suppression. Perhaps researchers would be able to investigate if being multi-lingual helps with this or if there is some brain process that makes it easier for them to encode information to memory and therefore to learn multiple languages and then easily interpret between them. Lastly, the study regarding face recognition and identification reinforces the notion that articulatory suppression interferes with an individual's ability to encode information.

=== Task switching ===
In our every day-to-day life, articulatory suppression can affect our ability to switch between tasks. A study by Liefooghe, Vandierendonck, Muyllaert, Verbruggen and Vanneste looked at the role of articulatory suppression can have on task switching. During their study, they conducted three experiments. In the first experiment, participants were asked to sort cards and were instructed either to perform the task silently or to repeat the word "de". The results indicated that articulatory suppression affected how quick participants were to switching between the sorting tasks. The reaction time increased for participants who were under articulatory suppression compared to those who were not. The remaining two experiments also received results indicating articulatory suppression had an effect on task switching.

Results from Saeki and Saito's study concluded the effect of articulatory suppression on mixing cost during task switching but not on the actual switch cost. Their study tested participants in their verbal representation in sequential task decisions. The results indicated the use of verbal representation is effective in sequential task decision, which could be affected by articulatory suppression. Saeki, Saito and Kawaguchi tested the effects of three concurrent task conditions on task switching (control, articulatory suppression, and tapping). The results obtained from their study concluded that articulatory suppression had a greater effect compared to the control and tapping conditions.

From the current studies, one can see that articulatory suppression does affect the ability and reaction time in task switching conditions. Wallace, Silvers, Martin, & Kenworthy conducted experiments to see if individuals with autism use inner speech in task completion. The results from this study also provided information on the effect of articulatory suppression on task switching and completion. Further studies can look at the effect of articulatory suppression on certain professions and the correlations between their experience in task switching and the effect of articulatory suppression.

=== False memories ===
A study by Macé and Caza looked at the role of articulatory suppression on immediate false recognition. During their first experiment, they created two groups of participants randomly. Participants in both groups were asked to listen to a list of words through headphones; and were instructed to point to "yes" or "no" during the second list in whether they recalled that word from the first list. Participants in the articulatory suppression group were instructed to count 1 to 10 during both presentations of the lists and until completion of responding to the second list. Results from this study indicated, the effects of articulatory suppression increased false recognition of mismatching words on the second list.

A current study done by Van Damme, Menten and d'Ydewalle looked at the effects of articulatory suppression on explicit false memory. The study consisted of an experiment, which looked at the effects on explicit memory compared to implicit and veridical memory. The results of their study showed that articulatory suppression, during encoding information, eliminated implicit false memory and heightened explicit false memory.

Results from both of these studies, indicate that articulatory suppression has an effect on how we retain information and in increasing our false recognition of memories. Further studies can look at how this effect can contribute to eyewitness testimonies and in recall of events.

=== Effects on working memory ===
A study by Hayes and Chenoweth looks at the role of articulatory suppression in working memory. The articulatory suppression condition group asked participants to repeat the word "tap" aloud to a metronome while they transcribed text. The control group had to tap their foot to the metronome as they transcribed the text. The results of the study indicated, that participants who were under articulatory suppression condition had a significant reduction in typing rate and significant increase in the number of uncorrected errors. In summary, this study shows how articulatory suppression interfered with verbal working memory.

Working memory works with both phonological loop and the visuospatial sketchpad, in the study performed by Jalbert and Saint-Aubin. They looked at the effects of articulatory suppression on visual similarity recall for where and when. Their experiment consisted of participants placing a series of colored squares into their appropriate locations, as presented before. During the experiment, participants who experienced articulatory suppression were hindered by similarity in recalling the location of the colored squares.

Information from both of these studies indicated that articulatory suppression has an effect on working memory in performing tasks. In the first study, the effects of articulatory suppression took place as participants transcribed text, which included using their working memory. In the second experiment, participants were asked to use their visuospatial sketchpad to recall the location of colored squares, but articulatory suppression took a great deal of their working memory in performing these tasks, which hindered participants.
