= Schooley peneplain =

American low-relief plain

The Schooley peneplain is a peneplain in the eastern Appalachians extending from the US state of New Jersey into Pine Mountain in Kentucky. The peneplain takes name from Schooley's Mountain where it can be appreciated as a flattish surface. The age of formation of the peneplain and its extent have been subjects of a protracted debate. Some 20th century geologists and geographers considered that the peneplain dipped east under the Atlantic Plain as an unconformity underlying Cretaceous sediments. Consequently, they posited an Early Cretaceous or Jurassic age. Various authors, including Douglas Wilson Johnson, have however objected to the equivalence of the peneplain to the unconformity. Since the 2000s, an Oligocene to middle Miocene age has been proposed for the peneplain. According to this last view, the uplift and dissection of the peneplain started in the late Miocene.

Schooley peneplain is one of the four main peneplains identified in the Appalachians, the others being Fall Zone, Harrisburg and Sommerville.
