= Scholar (disambiguation) =

A scholar is a person who is a researcher or has expertise in an academic discipline.

Scholar or The Scholar' may also refer to:

== People ==
- Michael Scholar (born 1942), British civil servant
- Tom Scholar (born 1968), British civil servant

== Literature ==
- The Scholar (journal), St. Mary's Law Review on Minority Issues
- The Scholars (poem), by W. B. Yeats, 1914/15
- The Scholars (novel), by Wu Jingzi, 1750
- The Scholar (novel), by Dervla McTiernan, 2019

== Music ==
- Scholars (album), by Buke and Gase, 2019
- Scholars, a 1950s Texas music group with Kenny Rogers
- The Scholars (vocal group), a British a cappella group
- The Scholars (album), a 2025 album by Car Seat Headrest

== Film and television ==
- The Scholar (film), (1918 film) an American film featuring Oliver Hardy
- The Scholar (TV series), a 2005 American reality television series

== Other uses ==
- Scholar, a student with a scholarship, a form of financial aid
- Google Scholar, Google scholarly papers search engine

== See also ==
- Category:Scholars and academics
- Schooler (disambiguation)
- School (disambiguation)
- Scholastic (disambiguation)
- Scholarism, a Hong Kong political movement
- Scholarly method
- Scholasticism
- Scholar-official, a bureaucrat official of Imperial China
- Scholars Academy, in South Carolina, U.S.
- Scholars' Academy, in New York, U.S.
- Academic degree
- Academic staff
- Expert
- Intellectual
- Professor
- Research
- Student
- The Scholar Ship, a 2007–08 academic program on a ship
