= Schoolies =

Schoolies may refer to:

- Schoolies week, an Australian high-school graduate tradition
- Skoolies, people who convert school buses into recreational vehicles

== See also ==
- Schooley (disambiguation)
- School (disambiguation)
