= Nina Schooler =

American psychologist

- Born: July 26, 1934 (age 91); New York City, New York
- Education: City College of New York (B.S.S., 1951); Columbia University (Ph.D., 1969)
- Spouse: Carmi Schooler (m. 1956–2018)
- Scientific career
- Fields: Psychiatry; Psychopharmacology
- Institutions: SUNY Downstate Medical Center
- Thesis: Transformational distinctions and the comprehension of sentences; the effects of schizophrenia and education (1969)

Nina R. Schooler (born July 26, 1934) is an American psychologist. She is a professor in the Department of Psychiatry and Behavioral Sciences at SUNY Downstate Medical Center, as well as a founding member of the Brain and Behavior Research Foundation's scientific council. She is known for her research on the treatment of schizophrenia, as well as tardive dyskinesia and first-episode psychosis. She is a past president of the American Psychopathological Association and of the Association for Clinical Psychosocial Research. She previously worked at the National Institute of Mental Health and the University of Pittsburgh. The American Society of Clinical Psychopharmacology established the Nina Schooler Early Career Research Award in her honor.
