= Schooley's Mountain Historic District =

Historic district in New Jersey, United States

- U.S. National Register of Historic Places
- U.S. Historic district
- New Jersey Register of Historic Places
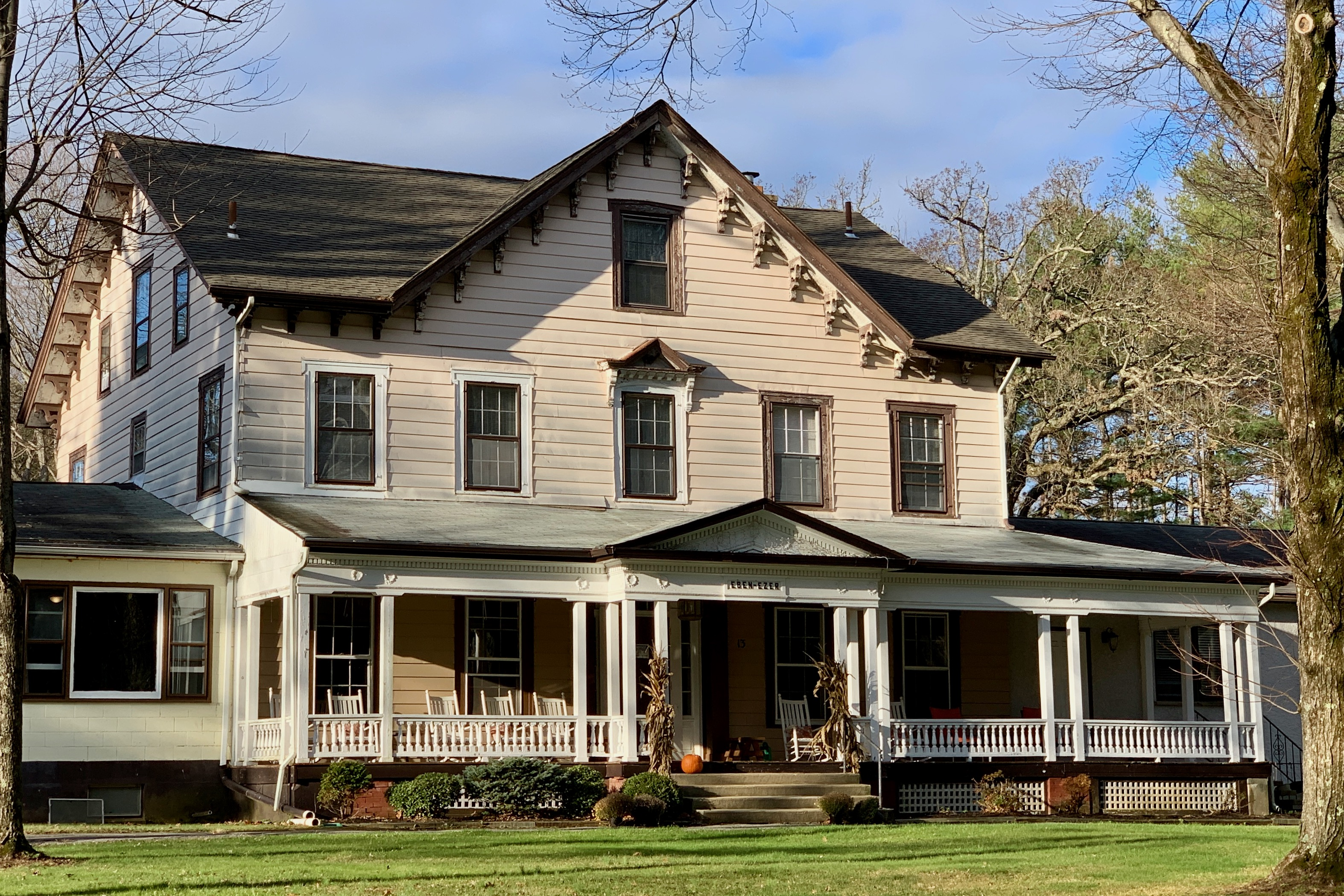
- Eben-Ezer, Liebenzell Mission, 13 Heath Lane

- Location within Morris County, New Jersey Location within New Jersey Location within the United States
- Location: Schooley's Mountain, Pleasant Grove, and Flocktown Roads, and Heath Lane, Schooley's Mountain, New Jersey
- Coordinates: 40°48′7″N 74°48′53″W
- Area: 237.2 acres (96.0 ha)
- Architectural style: Greek Revival, Italianate, Queen Anne
- NRHP reference No.: 91000677
- NJRHP No.: 2265

Significant dates
- Added to NRHP: June 14, 1991
- Designated NJRHP: April 17, 1991

Schooley's Mountain Historic District is a historic district along Schooley's Mountain, Pleasant Grove, and Flocktown Roads, and Heath Lane in the Schooley's Mountain section of Washington Township, Morris County, New Jersey. It was added to the National Register of Historic Places on June 14, 1991 for its significance in architecture, entertainment/recreation, and health/medicine. The district includes 71 contributing buildings, such as the Oak Cottage, site of schoolhouse No. 5, Schooley's Mountain Store, the William W. Marsh House, Christadelphian Bible Camp, the former Heath House Hotel, former Forest Grove Hydropathic Institute, Mine Hill Farm, the Marsh Mine and several private residences and commercial buildings.

== History ==
The area grew as a nineteenth century summer resort built around a mineral spring on Schooley's Mountain near a brook that flowed to the Musconetcong River. Schooley's Mountain Springs were rich in iron, termed chalybeate, and said to have healing powers.

== Description ==
The Highlands Presbyterian Church on Heath Lane was built in 1870 and has a three-story bell tower. The William W. Marsh House at 13 Heath Lane was built c. 1865 with Italianate style and is now used by the Liebenzell Mission and named Eben-Ezer. The Strawbridge House at 2 Pleasant Grove Road was built c. 1880, also with Italianate style. The Terriberry House at 4 Pleasant Grove Road was built with Shingle style architecture. The gentleman's farmhouse at 18 Pleasant Grove Road was built c. 1840 and remodeled c. 1910 in Neoclassical style. It was once a stop on the stagecoach line between Morristown and Easton.

== Gallery of contributing properties ==
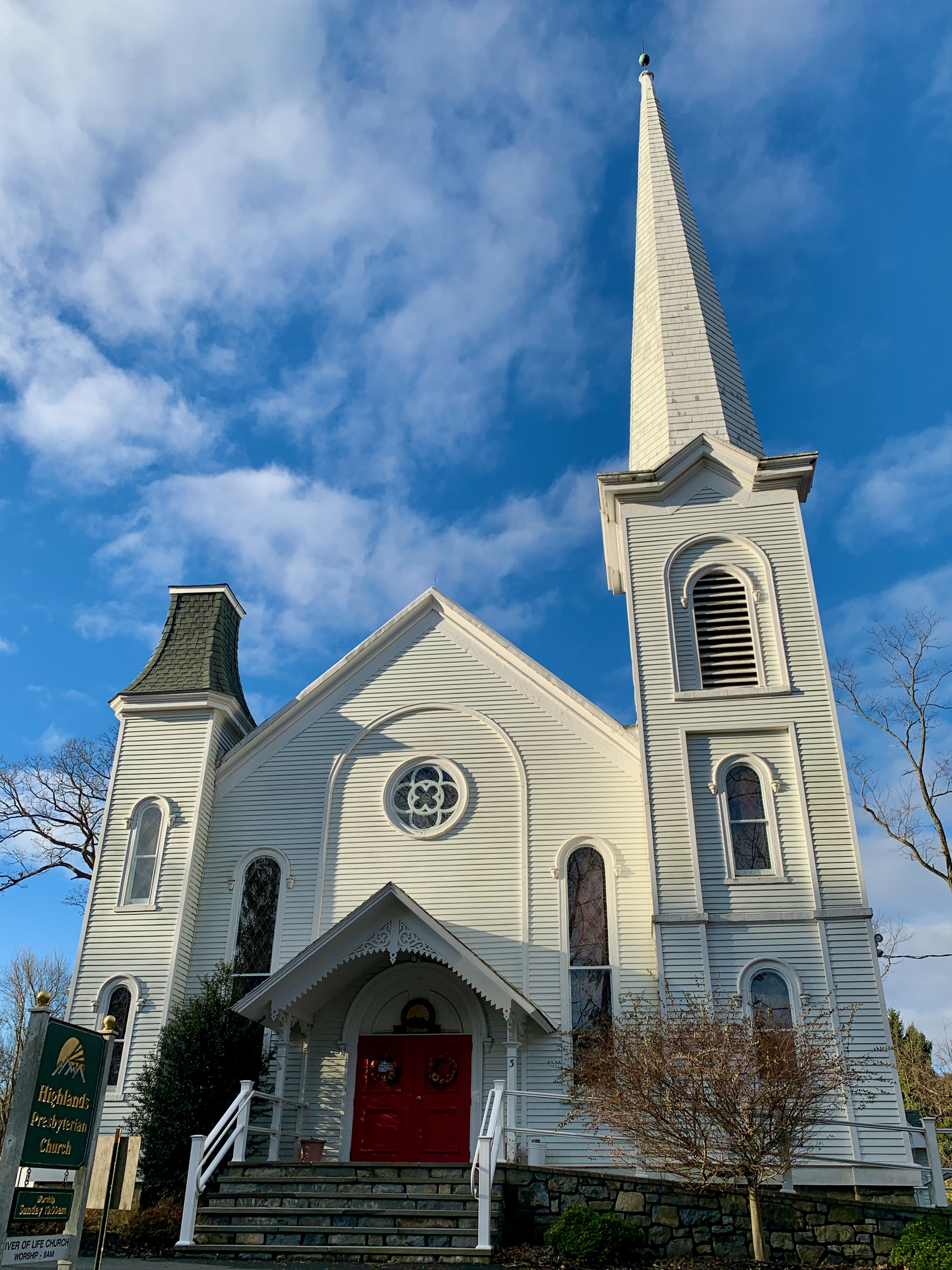
Presbyterian Church on Heath Lane

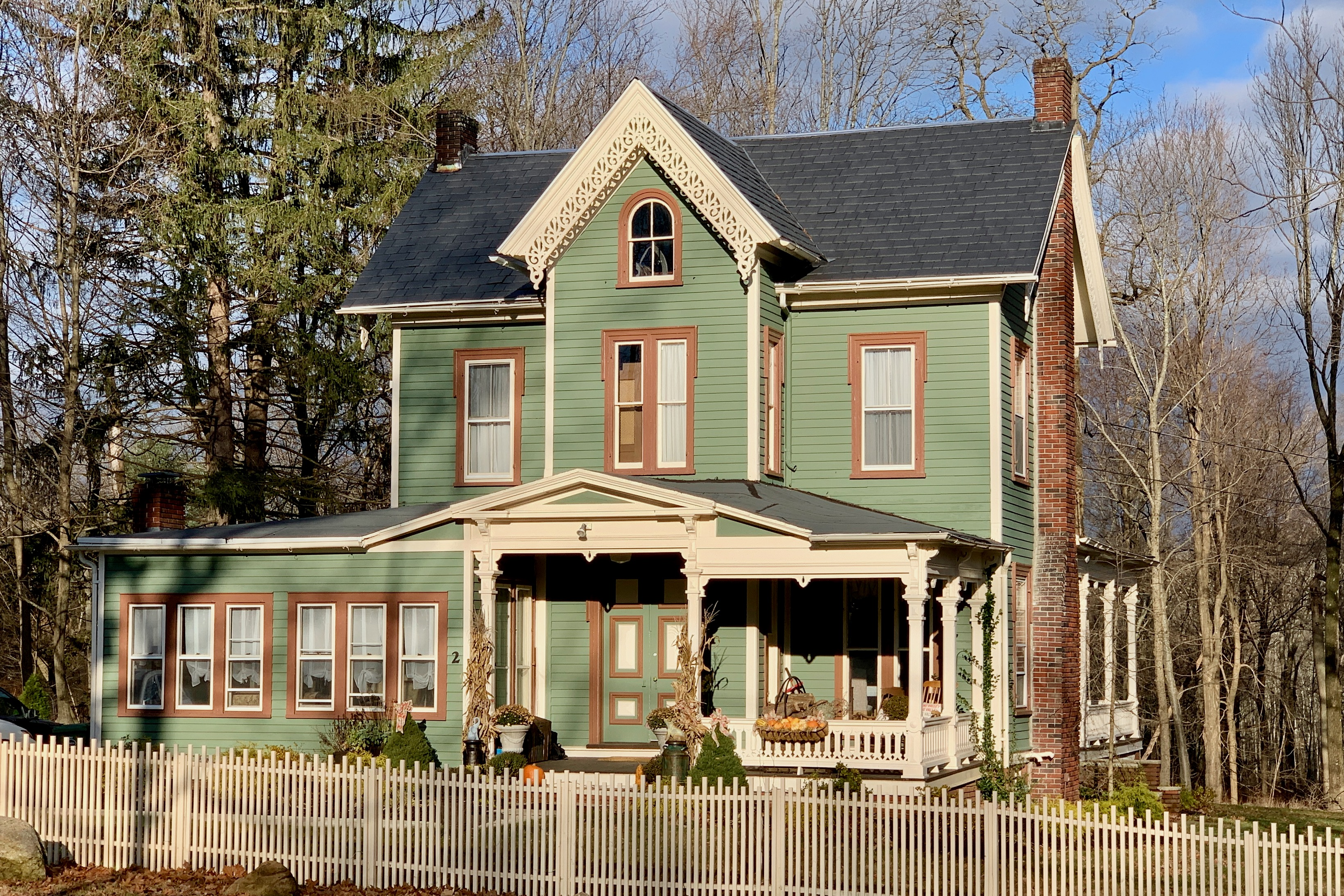
Italianate style house at 2 Pleasant Grove Road

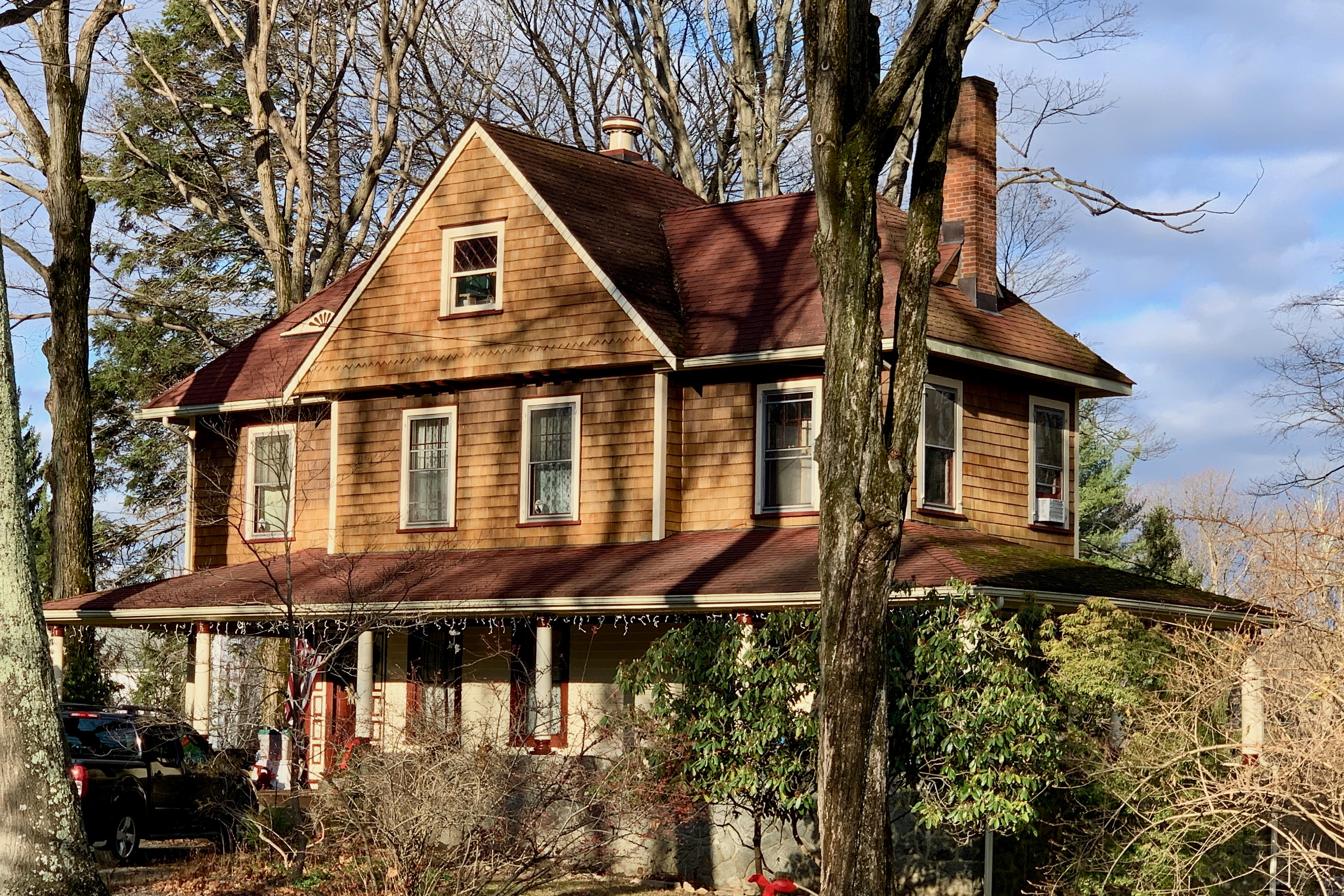
Shingle style house at 4 Pleasant Grove Road

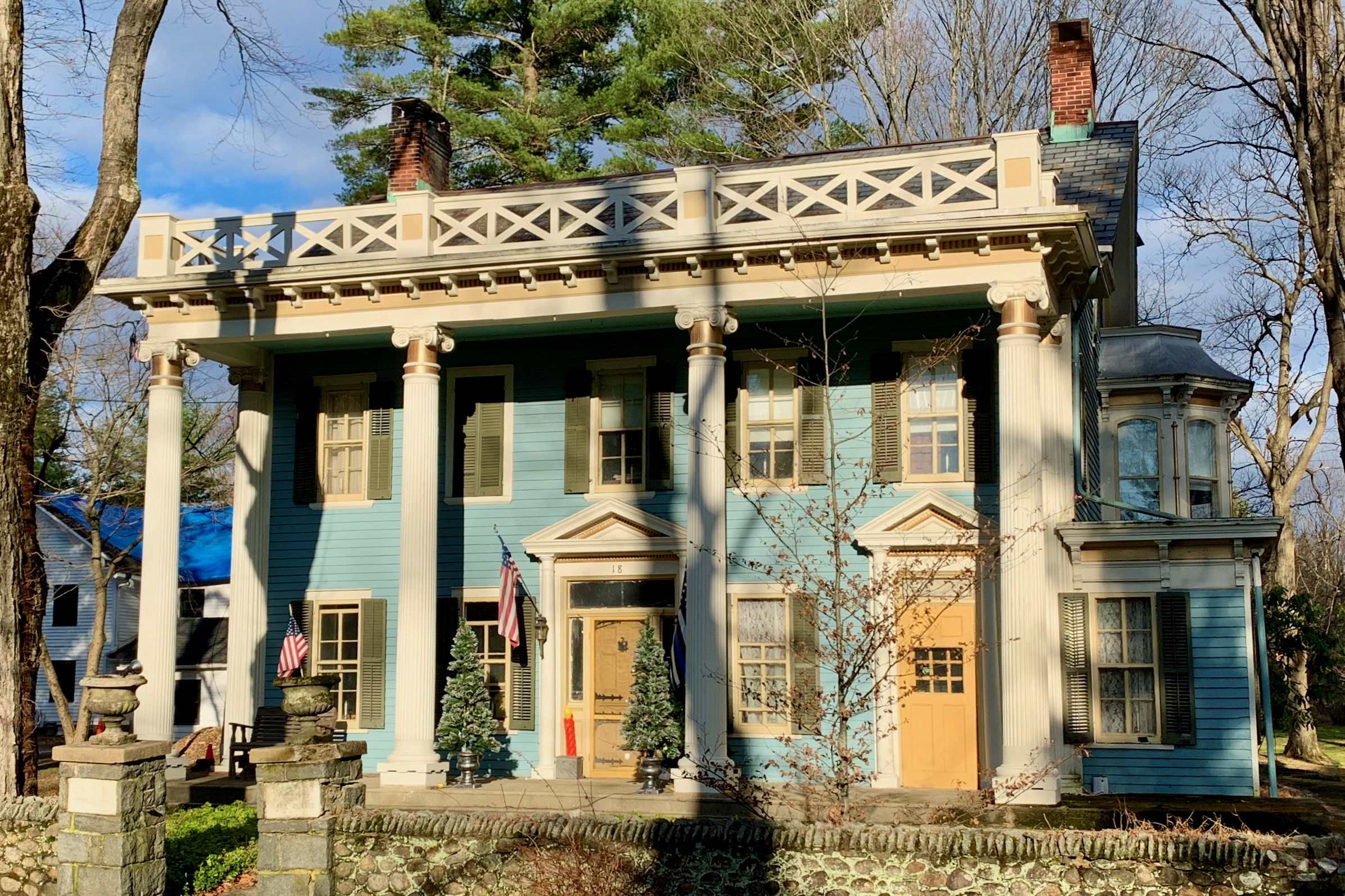
Neoclassical style house at 18 Pleasant Grove Road

== See also ==
- National Register of Historic Places listings in Morris County, New Jersey
