= Schooling (surname) =

Schooling is a surname. Notable people with the surname include:

- Elisabeth Schooling (1915–1998), British ballet dancer
- Herbert W. Schooling (1912–1987), American educator
- Joseph Schooling (born 1995), Singaporean swimmer
- William Schooling (1860–1936), British insurance expert
