= Schooley's Mountain =

Mountain ridge in New Jersey, United States

Schooleys Mountain
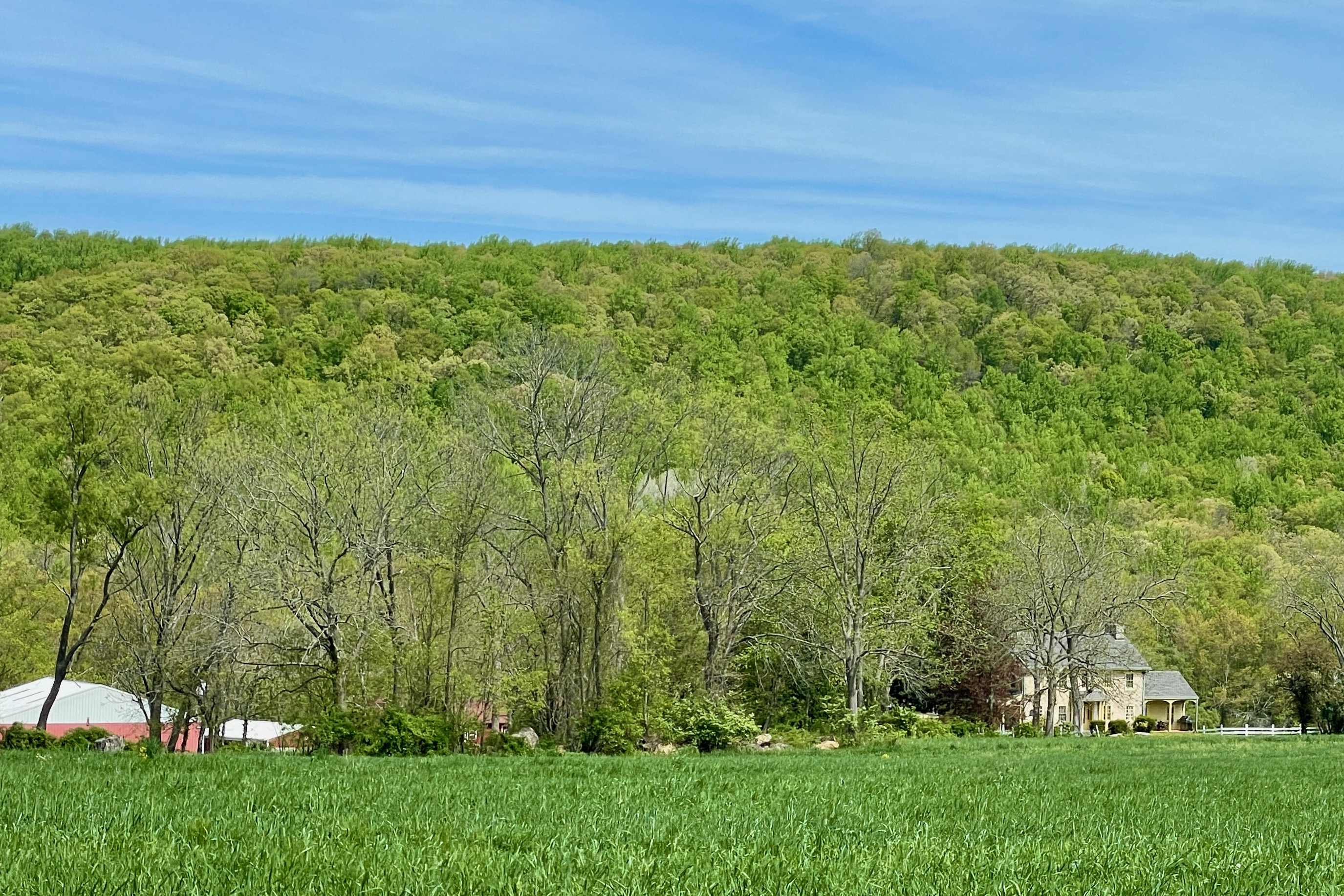
- Schooley's Mountain, view from Long Valley, New Jersey

Highest point
- Elevation: 1,200 feet (366 m)
- Coordinates: 40°49′45″N 74°47′37″W

Geography
- Location: Washington Township, Morris County, New Jersey, U.S.
- Topo map: USGS Hackettstown

Climbing
- Easiest route: Road

Schooley's or, officially, Schooleys Mountain is a mountain ridge in northern New Jersey that stretches from Lake Hopatcong in the north to Hampton in the south. It is centrally located within the southern Highlands, positioned almost equidistantly from the Kittatinny Valley in the west and the Piedmont plateau in the east. Schooley's Mountain is also one of the largest ridges in a group of geologically similar and parallel mountains, which include Allamuchy Mountain, Pohatcong Mountain, Scotts Mountain, and Jenny Jump Mountain.

== Geography ==
Schooley's Mountain is separated from Musconetcong Mountain by a gap and the valley of Spruce Run, which bifurcates the mountain itself higher in its course. The mountain ridge extends about 20 miles northeast, being separated by Budd Lake and the South Branch Raritan River from Mooney Mountain. The northeasternmost point looks out upon Waterloo and the Musconetcong River, the valley of which lies upon its northwestern side; on the southeastern side is Washington Township, Morris County, New Jersey, drained by the South Branch Raritan River.

Prominent subsidiary peaks include Mount Kipp (951 feet (290 m)), at the southeastern tip, and Point Mountain (935 feet (285 m)), overlooking Anderson in the Musconetcong Valley. The summit of the ridge proper lies in an area of private homes on Kim Lane, on the northeastern part of the ridge.

The community of Schooley's Mountain is on top and in the middle of the ridge, which rises about 400 to 800 feet (120 to 240 m) above the surrounding valley.

== History ==
The mountain is named for the Schooley family, Quaker landowners in the area during the 1790s.

The mountain air and the chalybeate springs on the mountain once made it a fashionable summer destination. For similar reasons, a state tuberculosis sanatorium was once located around Mount Kipp in Lebanon Township.

Many small iron mines were worked on the mountain in the late 19th century. Granite was also quarried from the mountain.

The main crossing at the mountain is Schooley's Mountain Road, formerly Washington Turnpike. General George Washington noted in his diary that he considered the route from "Dutch Valley to Schooley's Mountain a hazardous and round about thoroughfare."

== Recreation ==
While much of the flatter terrain on the ridge has been cultivated or, more recently, developed for residential housing, much of Schooley's Mountain is still wooded. On the northwest side, Cataract Park, along Schooleys Mountain Road (Route 24), preserves a waterfall and an old mine opening on the steep side of the ridge. Schooley's Mountain County Park, home of Randolph YMCA's Camp Washington, encloses the valley of Long Valley and small Lake George on the southeastern side of the mountain. Lake George has been drained and dredged but swimming is no longer permitted. The Electric Brook runs from Lake George over several waterfalls in the park before it reaches the south branch of the Raritan River. The park offers once offered boat rentals and currently has a baseball field and gazebos beyond hiking. One of the completed segments of Patriots' Path runs through the park.

== See also ==
- Schooley peneplain
- Schooley's Mountain, New Jersey
- Schooley's Mountain Historic District
- High Bridge Branch, mostly abandoned railroad line running in the valley along the South Branch Raritan River.
