= Irrelevant speech effect =

The irrelevant speech effect (ISE) or irrelevant sound effect is the degradation of serial recall of a list when sounds, especially speech sounds, are presented. This occurs even if the list items are presented visually. The sounds do not need to be a language the participant understands, or even a real language; human speech sounds are sufficient to produce this effect.

The theory covers speech as well as music or other background sounds. There have been many studies on this theory and it has been consistently proven that unrelated or irrelevant background sounds inhibits one's ability to perform well at serial recall.

== Interference hypothesis ==
It is possible that the visual stimuli (the list of items) is held in working memory as a phonological code. The phonological loop is composed of the articulatory rehearsal loop and the phonological store. If that is the case, the irrelevant speech could interfere with the articulatory rehearsal process, degrading the information in the phonological store. This would result in degraded performance on trials where irrelevant speech is presented. However, the effect should be greater for words rehearsed longer (i.e., presented earlier in the series) since they are rehearsed more often, hence having more opportunity for degradation.
