= School (disambiguation) =

A school is an institution for learning.

School or the school may also refer to:

- School of thought, a number of individuals with shared styles, approaches or aims
- School (fish), a group of fish swimming in the same direction in a coordinated manner

== Education ==
- School (division), a division of a college or university focused on related subjects
- The School at Columbia University ("The School") The Columbia University primary school

== Arts, entertainment, and media ==
=== Art ===
- School of art, not in the educational sense but as a school of thought; an art movement

=== Film ===
- School (2025 film), an Indian Tamil-language horror film
- The School (film), a 2018 Australian horror film

=== Music ===
==== Groups ====
- The School (British band)
- The School (Norwegian band)

==== Songs ====
- "School" (Supertramp song), 1974
- "School" (Madonna song), 2026
- "School", by Nirvana from Bleach, 1989
- "School", by Toby Fox from Deltarune Chapter 1 OST from the video game Deltarune, 2018

=== Television ===
- School (South Korean TV series) a South Korean anthology series
- School (2011 TV series), a 2011 Japanese serial drama
- JKT48 School, an Indonesian variety show
- The School (Sapphire & Steel), an audio serial based on the TV series Sapphire & Steel

== See also ==
- Old school (disambiguation)
- Scholar (disambiguation)
- Scholastic (disambiguation)
- Scholasticism, a method of learning taught by the academics of medieval universities c. 1100–1500
- Schooled (disambiguation)
- Schooler (disambiguation)
- Schoolies (disambiguation)
- Schooling (disambiguation)
- Types of educational institutions
