= Schooley's Mountain, New Jersey =

Populated place in Morris County, New Jersey, US

Schooleys Mountain, New Jersey
- Unincorporated community
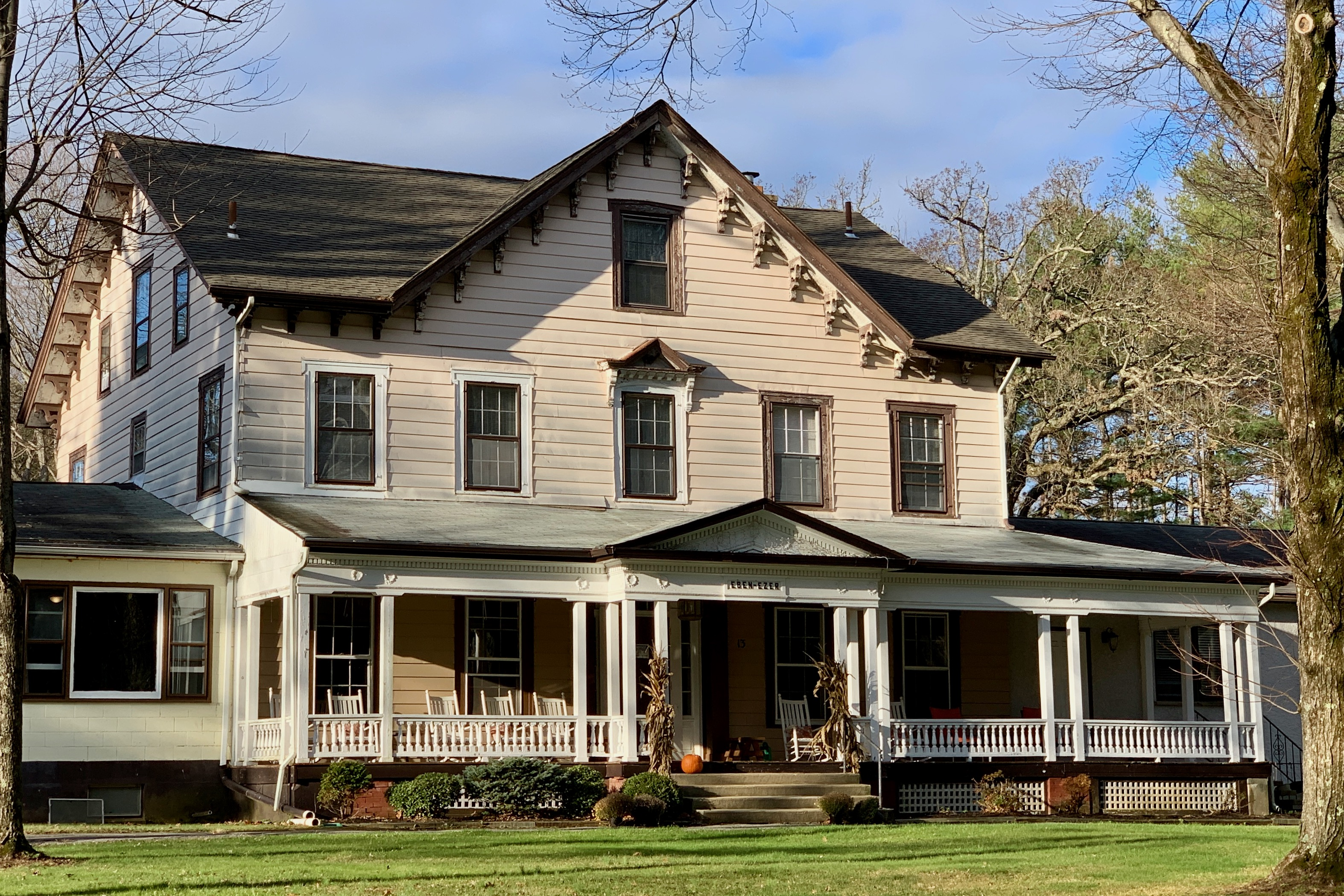
- Eben-Ezer Building in the Schooley's Mountain Historic District

- Location in Morris County (Inset: Morris County in New Jersey) Schooleys Mountain (New Jersey) Schooleys Mountain (the United States)
- Coordinates: 40°47′57″N 74°48′50″W
- Country: United States
- State: New Jersey
- County: Morris
- Township: Washington
- Named after: Schooley family
- Elevation: 1,020 ft (310 m)
- ZIP Code: 07853
- GNIS feature ID: 0880418

Schooley's Mountain is an unincorporated community located within Washington Township in Morris County, in the U.S. state of New Jersey. Named for the Schooley family who owned a considerable amount of land there in the 1790s, the community is on Schooley's Mountain, a mountain with an elevation of about 1,000 feet (300 m) directly north of Long Valley. Located about 45 miles (72 km) from New York City, the community is situated 600 feet (180 m) above the surrounding valley. It contains many housing developments and Schooley's Mountain Park, a recreational area with an overlook, a waterfall, and numerous hiking paths, as well as Lake George. In its past, Schooley's Mountain was a resort and an estate.

The earliest residents were the Lenape Native Americans, who called it home. The Vanderbilts were among the numerous New York City socialites who trekked to the mountain for its restorative waters. The rich chalybeate-infused waters were thought to improve health, and detoxify the system.

Schooley's Mountain County Park offers active and passive recreation on 797 acres (3.23 km^{2}). The park was acquired by the Morris County Parks Commission in 1969 and opened to the public in 1974.

Schooley's Mountain General Store opened in 1803 and is the oldest continuously operating general store in the state as of 2023. Notable visitors include Ulysses S. Grant, William Henry Harrison, Franklin D. Roosevelt and Robert De Niro.

== Historic district ==
The Schooley's Mountain Historic District encompassing the community was added to the National Register of Historic Places in 1991 for its significance in architecture, entertainment/recreation, and health/medicine.

== Gallery ==
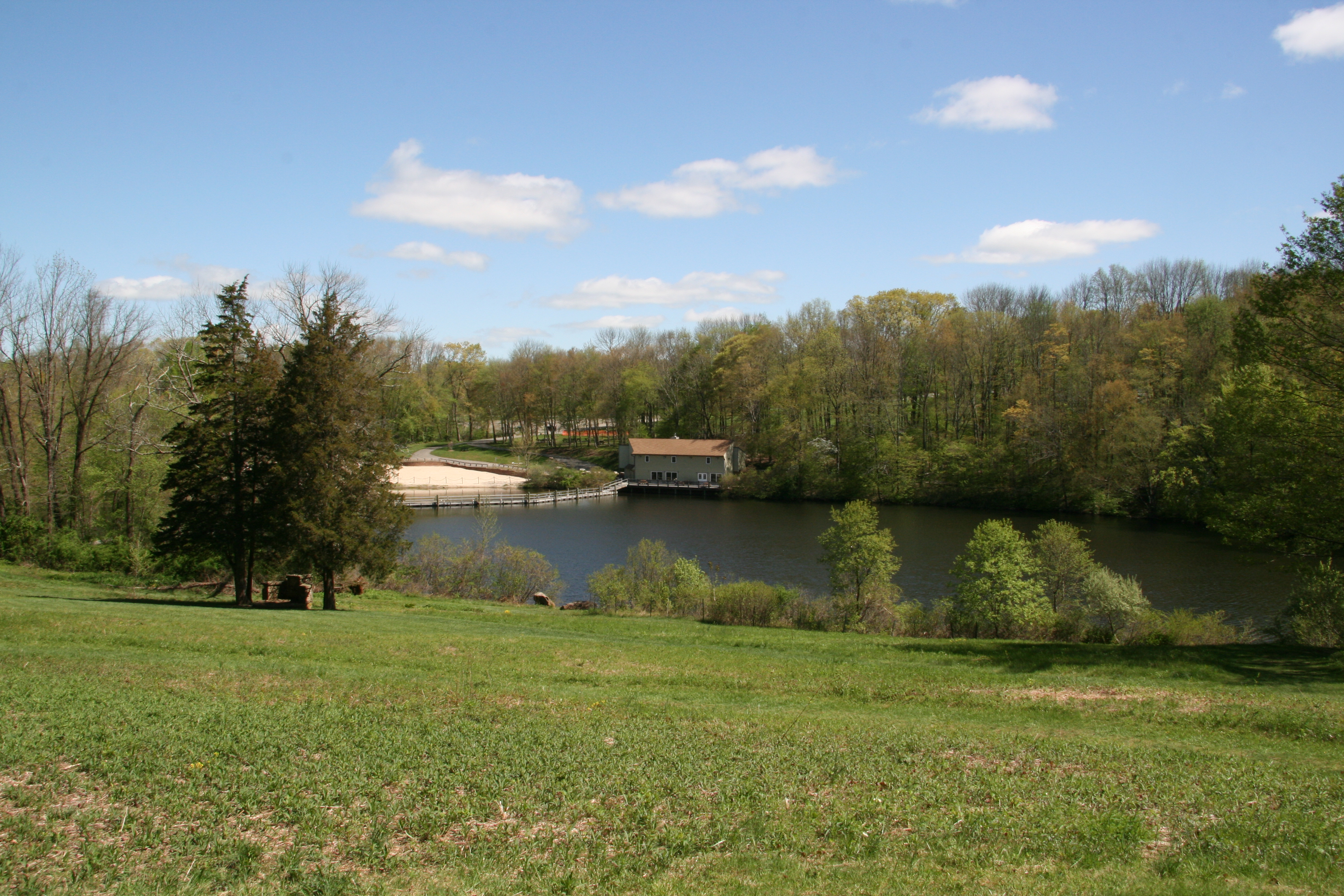
Field House and Lakefront, Schooley's Mountain Park

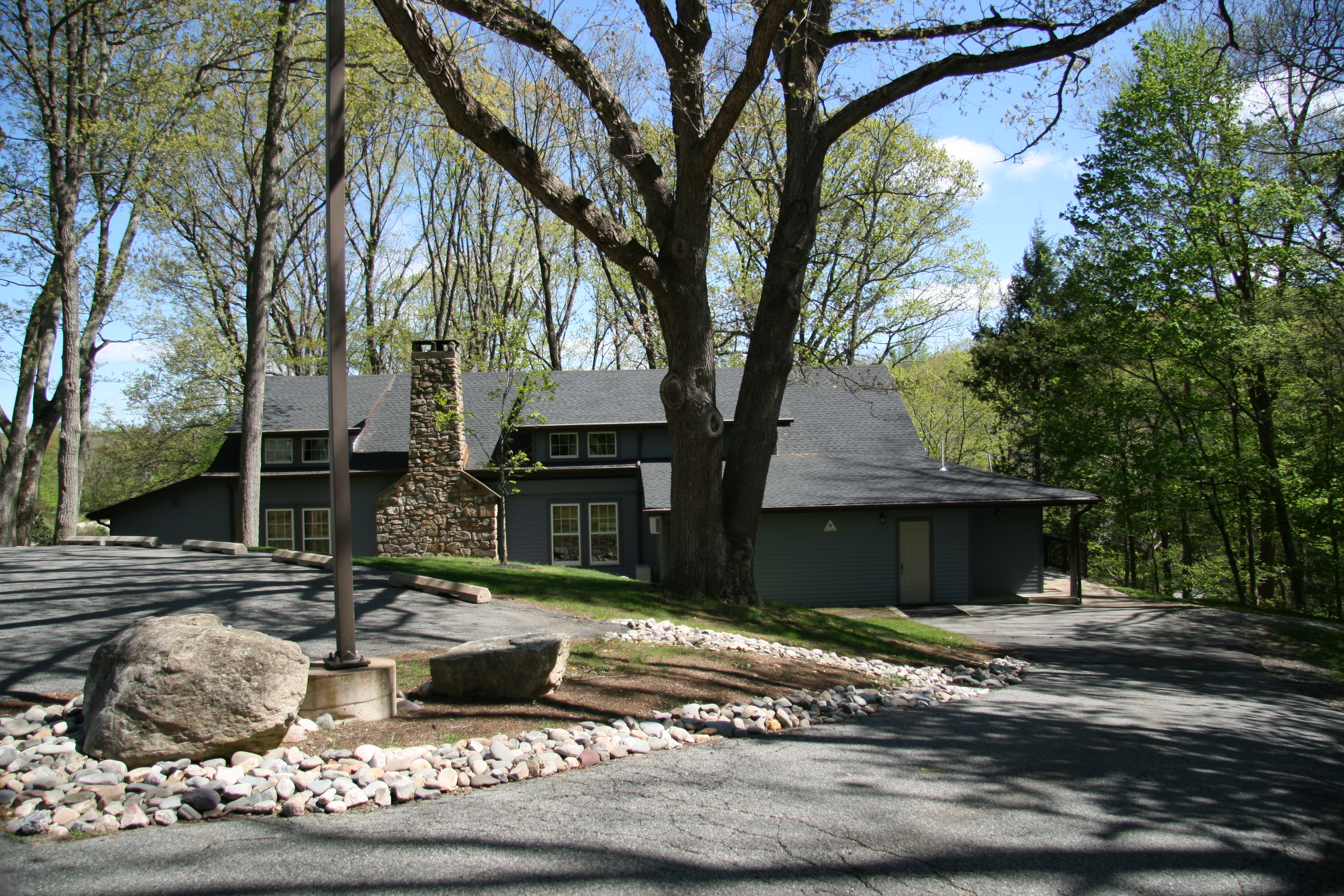
The Lodge at Schooley's Mountain Park

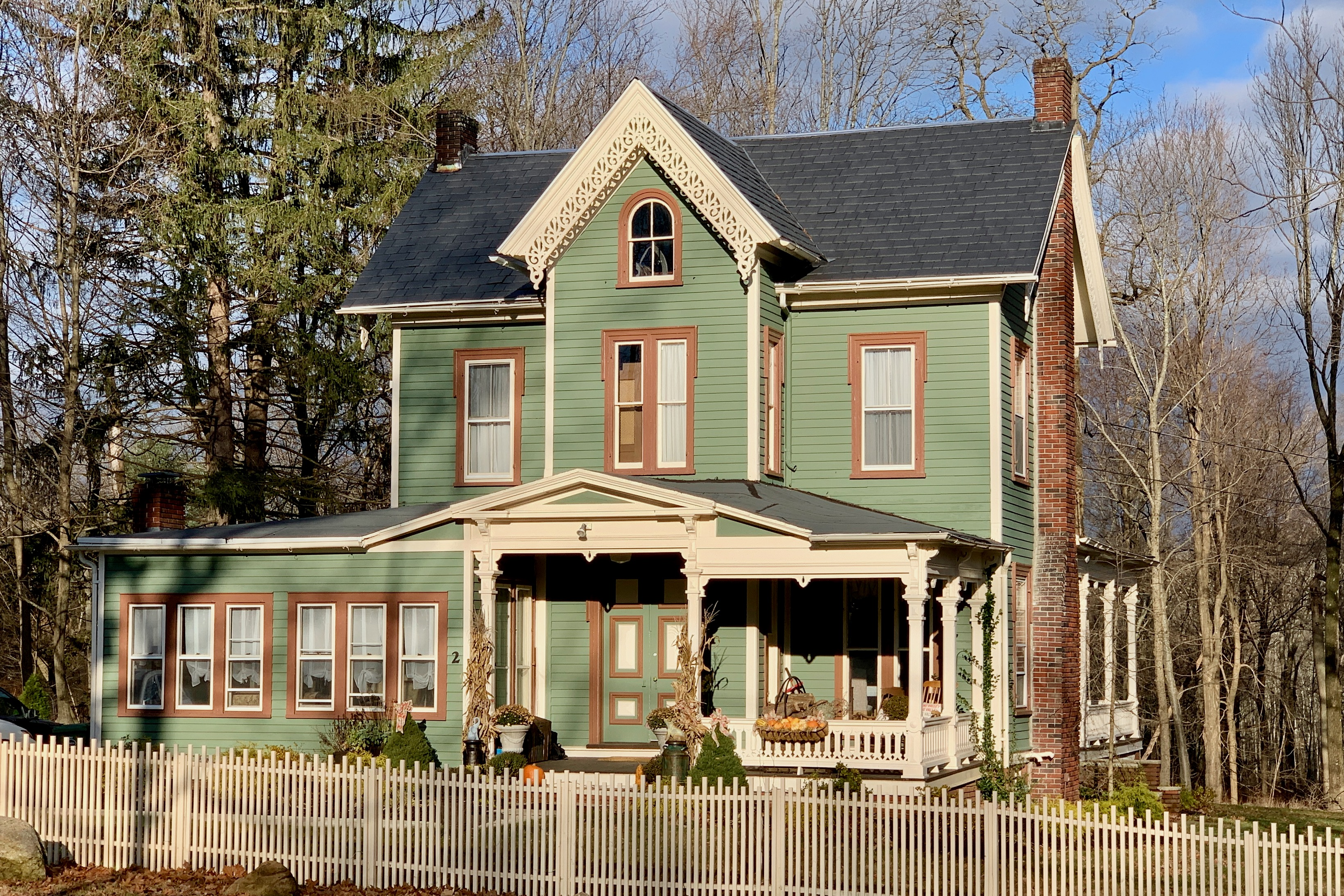
2 Pleasant Grove Road

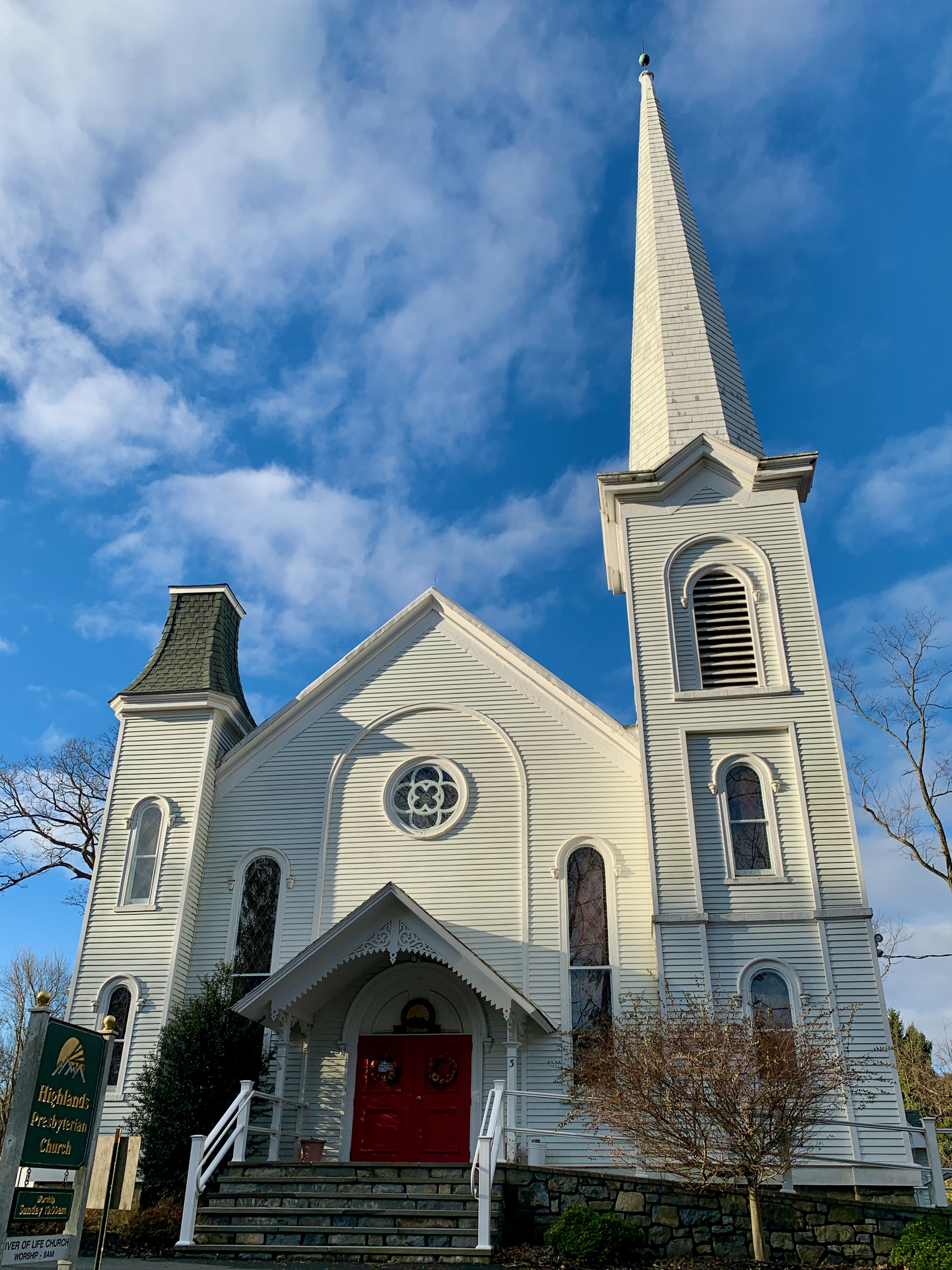
Highlands Presbyterian Church, 3 Heath Lane

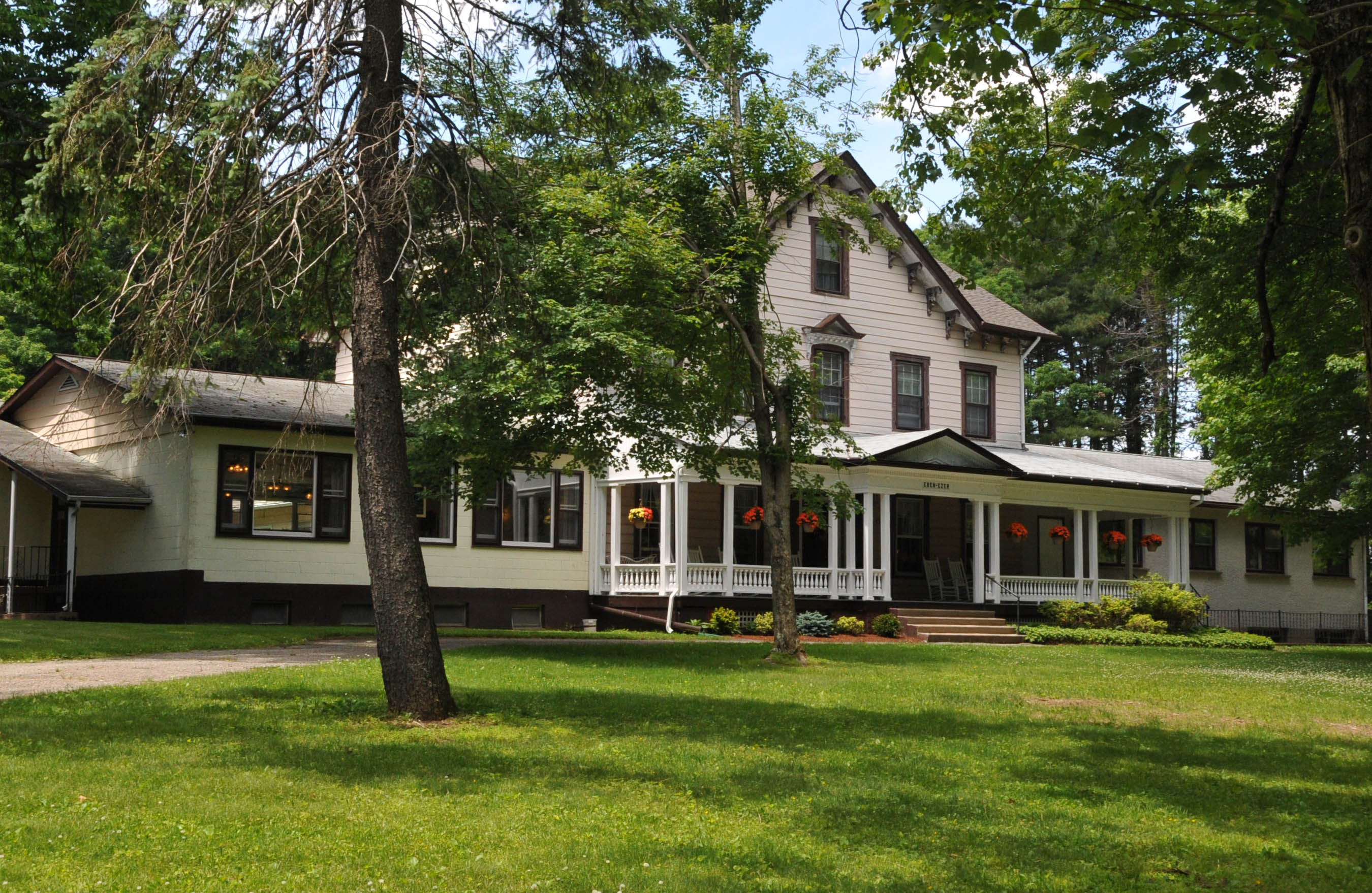
Liebenzell Mission

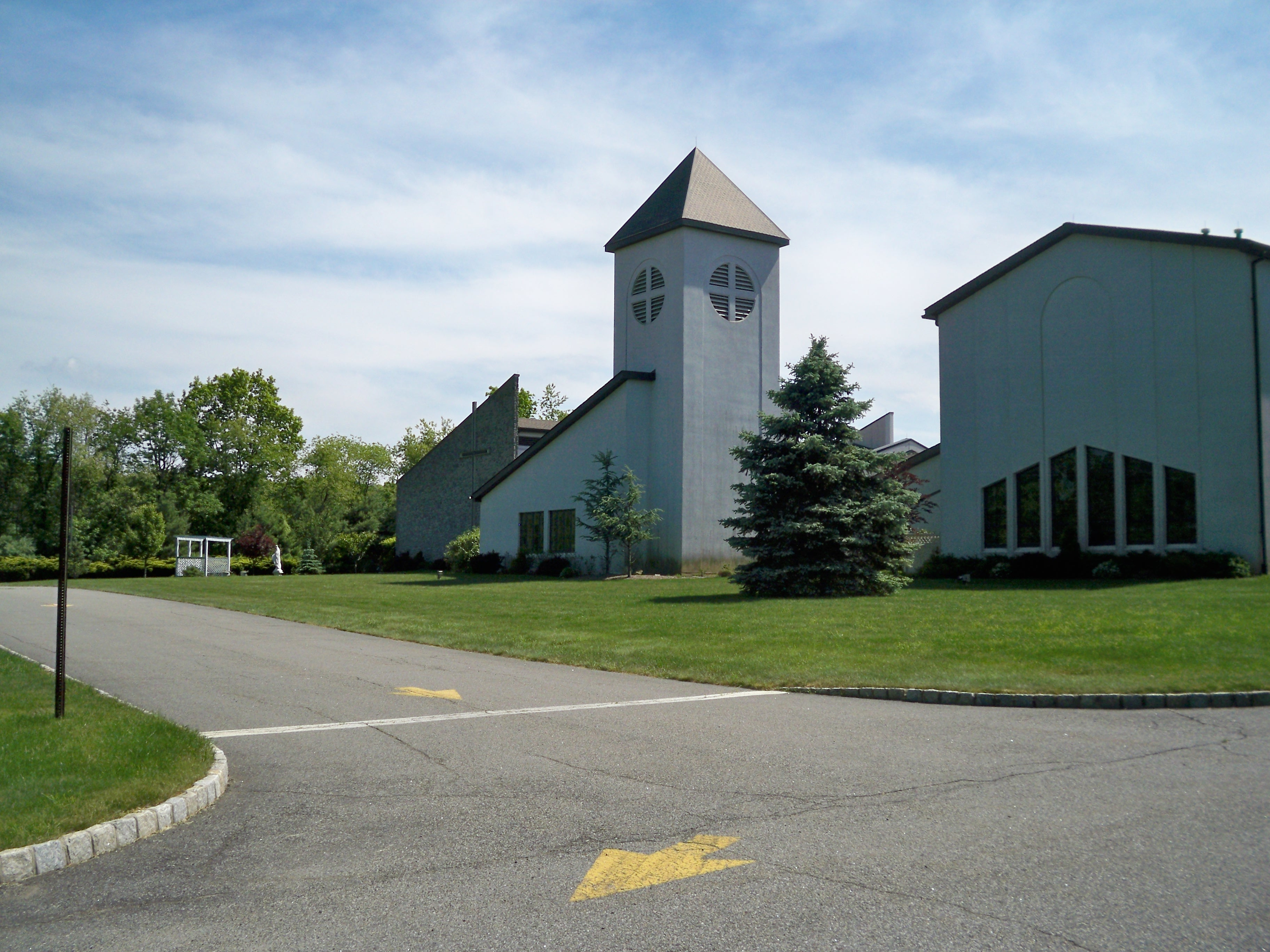
St. Mark the Evangelical Church, 59 Spring Lane
