= Jonathan Schooler =

American professor of psychology

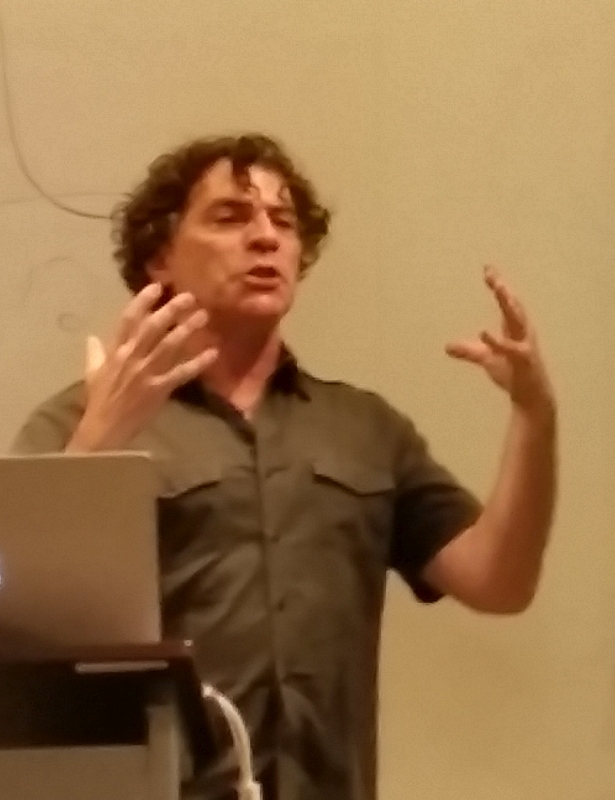
- Born: August 3, 1959 (age 67); United States
- Education: Hamilton College, University of Washington
- Known for: Consciousness studies

Jonathan Schooler (born August 3, 1959) is an American psychologist and Distinguished Professor of Psychological and Brain Sciences at the University of California, Santa Barbara, who researches various topics that intersect aspects of both cognitive psychology and philosophy such as: Belief in free will, Meta-awareness, Mindfulness, Mind-Wandering, Memory, Creativity, and Emotion. Schooler is also known for his sometimes controversial research on topics such as Anomalous Cognition and the decline effect.

== Early life and education ==
Schooler studied psychology at Hamilton College in Clinton, New York, where he graduated cum laude with B.A. in psychology in 1981. Schooler earned his master's degree and Ph.D. in psychology from the University of Washington in 1984 and 1987 respectively.

== Career ==
Schooler was hired as an assistant professor at the University of Pittsburgh, and he became a research scientist at Pittsburgh's Learning Research and Development Center. He earned the title of associate professor in 1993 and was named full professor of psychology in 2001.

In 2004 Schooler moved on to the University of British Columbia as professor of psychology, and served as the Canada Research Chair in Social Cognitive Sciences and Senior Investigator of the Brain Research Centre until 2007. Building on the writing of philosopher Francis Crick, Schooler began to pursue research related to philosophical world views such as beliefs about free will and their effect on behavior. In 2007 Schooler left UBC to join the faculty at the University of California, Santa Barbara where he is presently a Distinguished Professor of Psychological and Brain Sciences.

Schooler pioneered research on "verbal overshadowing" demonstrating that verbally describing events in one's life leads to less accuracy in the actual memory of the events.

== Selected works ==
=== Books ===
Cohen, J.C. and Schooler, J.W. (Eds.) (1997) Scientific Approaches to Consciousness Hillsdale, NJ: Lawrence Erlbaum.

=== Papers ===
- Schooler, J.W., Smallwood, J., Christoff, K, Handy, T.C., Reichle, E.D., & Sayette, M.A. (2011) Meta-awareness, perceptual decoupling and the wandering mind. Trends in Cognitive Sciences 15, 319–326.
- Schooler, J. W. (2011) Unpublished results hide the decline effect. Nature, 470(7335), 437.
- Schooler, J. W., Ohlsson, S., & Brooks, K. (1993). Thoughts beyond words: When language overshadows insight. Journal of experimental psychology: General, 122(2), 166.
- Schooler, J. W., Gerhard, D., & Loftus, E. F. (1986). Qualities of the unreal. Journal of Experimental Psychology: Learning, Memory, and Cognition, 12(2), 171.

== Honors, awards, and grants ==
Schooler is a former holder of a Tier 1 Canada Research Chair, a Fellow of a variety of scientific organizations such as the Association for Psychological Science, Society for Personality and Social Psychology, Osher Fellow at the Exploratorium Science Museum in San Francisco, as well as a member of a number of professional organizations including The Psychonomic Society, American Psychological Association, American Psychological Society, Midwestern Psychology Association, and Sigma Xi.

Schooler's work has been supported by grants from the United States and Canadian Governments as well as the United States Office of Education, the Canadian Institute for Health Research, National Institute of Mental Health, the Unilever Corporation, the John Templeton Foundation, the Canada Foundation of Innovation, Canada's Social Sciences and Humanities Research Council, and The Fetzer Institute.
