= The Scholar Ship =

Defunct cruise ship academic program

The Scholar Ship was an academic program aboard a modified Royal Caribbean Cruises passenger ship hosting both undergraduate and postgraduate students on semester-long voyages around the world. The discontinuation of the program was announced in June 2008.

Programs aboard the Scholar Ship were 16 weeks in duration. One was run in 2007 and another in 2008. Approximately 200 students from 35 countries participated in the inaugural voyage, which sailed on September 5, 2007.

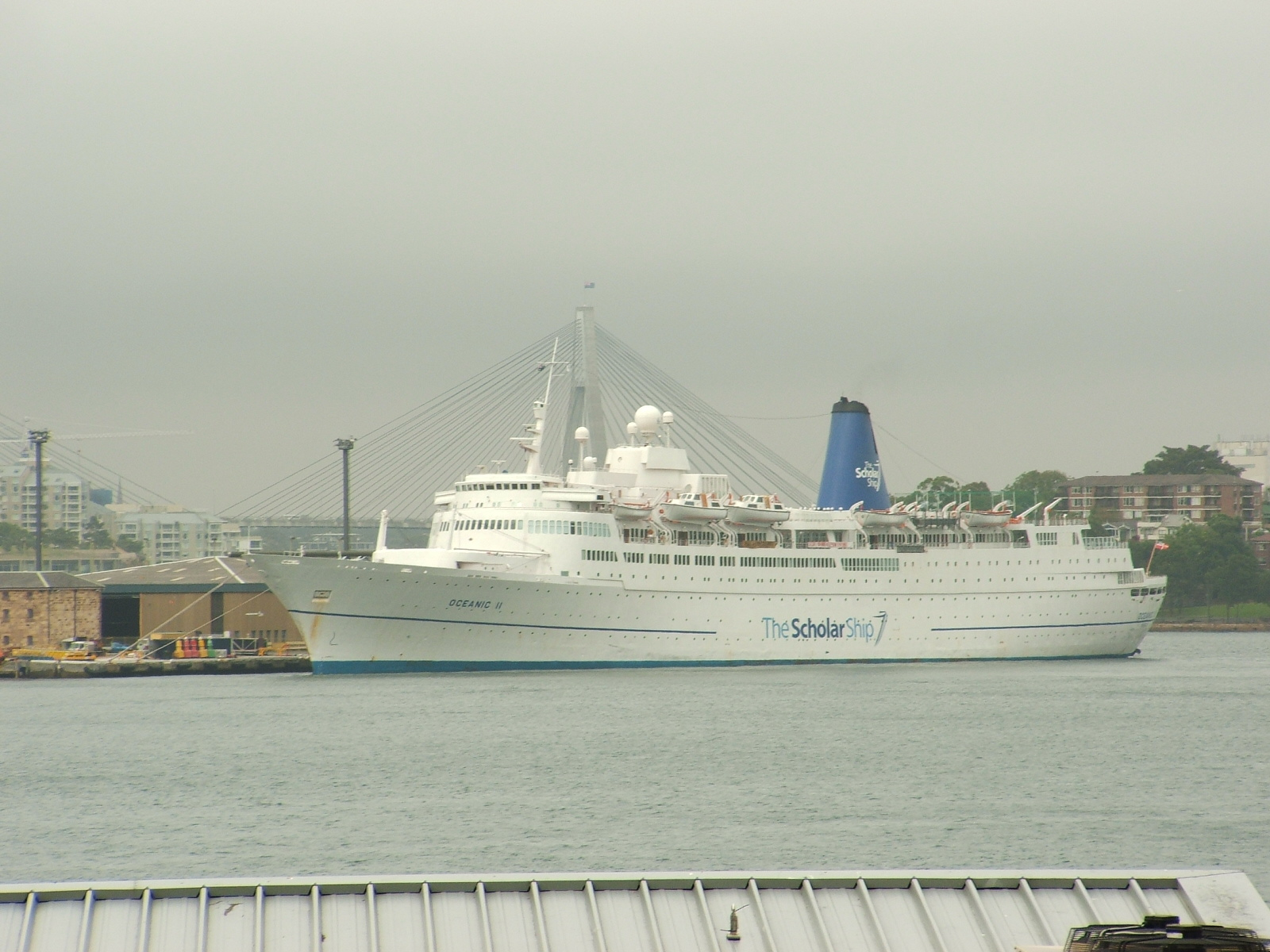
Oceanic II docked in Sydney Harbour in November 2007

The ScholarShip vessel was the MV Oceanic II. She is a 29,000 ton, 201 meter ocean liner with 398 staterooms that could accommodate 796 students, faculty and staff. The ship could also accommodate 416 crew members.

On June 11, 2008, the Scholar Ship indefinitely canceled all future voyages due to difficulties in raising the necessary finances. Efforts are underway to reorganize the program and raise the necessary funds to launch future voyages.

== See also ==
- Semester at Sea
