= MV Kungsholm =

Ship

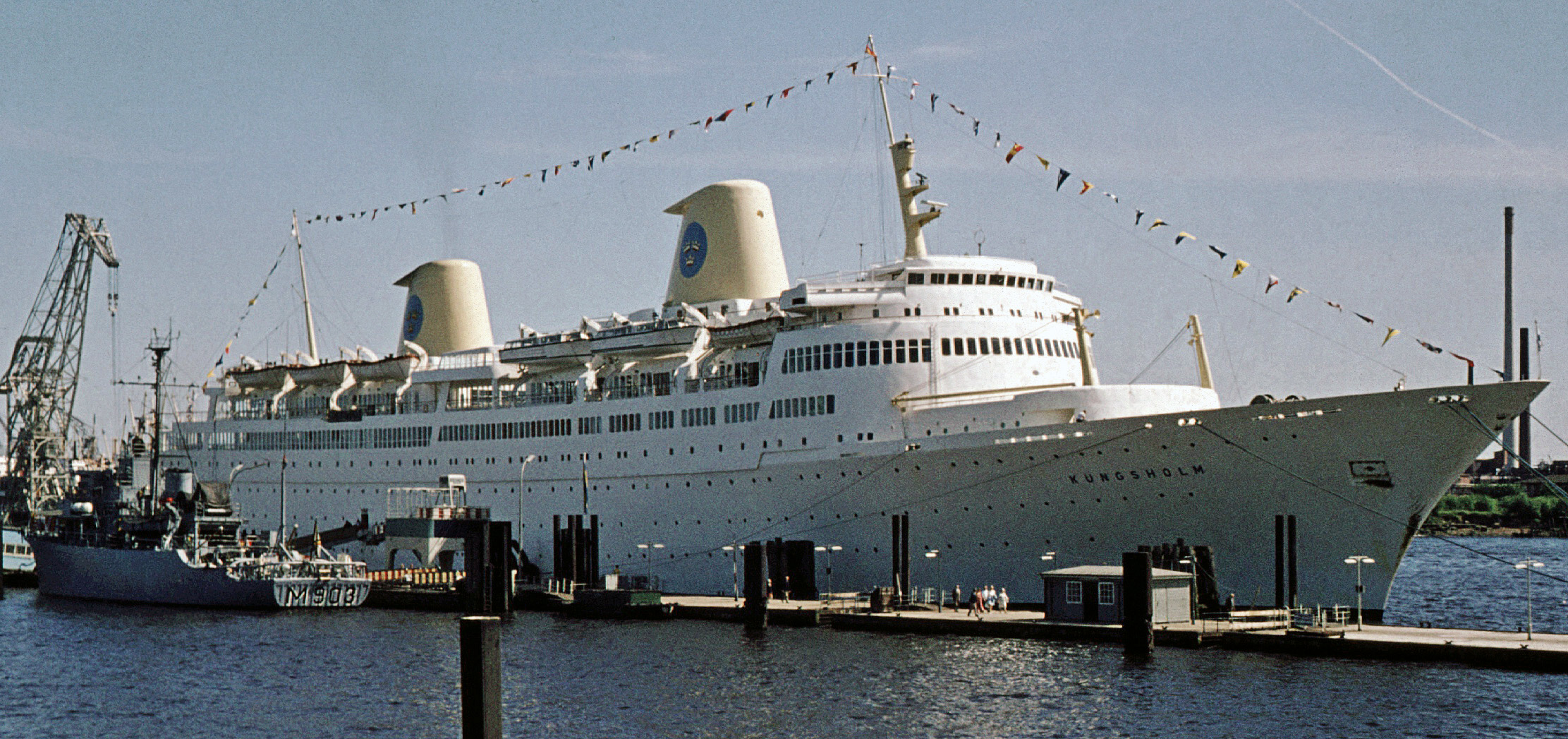
- Kungsholm at Hamburg, West Germany in 1973

History
- Name: 1966–1979: Kungsholm; 1979–1995: Sea Princess; 1995–2002: Victoria; 2002–2007: Mona Lisa; 2007–2008: Oceanic II; 2008–2010: Mona Lisa; 2010–2016: Veronica
- Owner: 1966–1975: A/B Svenska Amerika Linien (Swedish America Line); 1975–1978: Flagship Cruises; 1978–2000: P&O; 2000–2002: P&O Princess Cruises; 2002–2010: Leonardo Shipping; 2010–2015: DMSE-Oman
- Operator: 1966–1975: Swedish America Line; 1975–1978: Flagship Cruises; 1978–1999: P&O Cruises/Princess Cruises; 2000–2002: P&O Cruises; 2002–2006: Holiday Kreuzfahrten; 2007: Louis Cruise Lines; 2007: Pullmantur Cruises; 2007–2008: Royal Caribbean Cruises (The Scholar Ship); 2008: Lord Nelson-Seereisen; 2008–2009: Peace Boat; 2009–2010: Lord Nelson-Seereisen
- Port of registry: 1966–1975: Gothenburg, Sweden; 1975–1978: Monrovia, Liberia; 1978–2002: London, United Kingdom; 2002–2010: Nassau, Bahamas
- Builder: John Brown & Company, Clydebank, Scotland
- Yard number: 728
- Laid down: January 1964
- Launched: 14 April 1965 by Mrs. Annabella Broström
- Completed: November 1965
- Maiden voyage: 22 April 1966
- Out of service: September 2010
- Identification: IMO number: 6512354; Call sign C6RU6; MMSI number: 311192000
- Fate: Scrapped at Alang, India in 2016

General characteristics
- Tonnage: As built: 26,678 GRT; 1975: 18,174 GRT; 1978: 27,670 GRT; as of 2008: 28,891 GT
- Length: 201.33 m (660 ft 6 in)
- Beam: 26.57 m (87 ft 2 in)
- Draught: 8.56 m (28 ft 1 in)
- Installed power: 25,200 SHP
- Propulsion: Two Gotaverken diesels, twin screw
- Speed: 20 knots (37 km/h; 23 mph) (service); 25 knots (46 km/h; 29 mph) (maximum)
- Capacity: 108 1st class, 605 tourist class (Transatlantic service); 450 (cruising as built); 782 (as of 2008)
- Crew: 417

MV Kungsholm was built in 1964-65 by the John Brown & Company shipyard in Clydebank, Scotland as a combined ocean liner / cruise ship for the Swedish American Line. She was later rebuilt as a full-time cruise ship, sailing under the names Sea Princess, Victoria, Oceanic II and Mona Lisa. In September 2010 she was retired from service, as she did not fulfill requirements to SOLAS 2010, becoming the floating hotel Veronica, before being scrapped in 2016.

== Design and construction ==
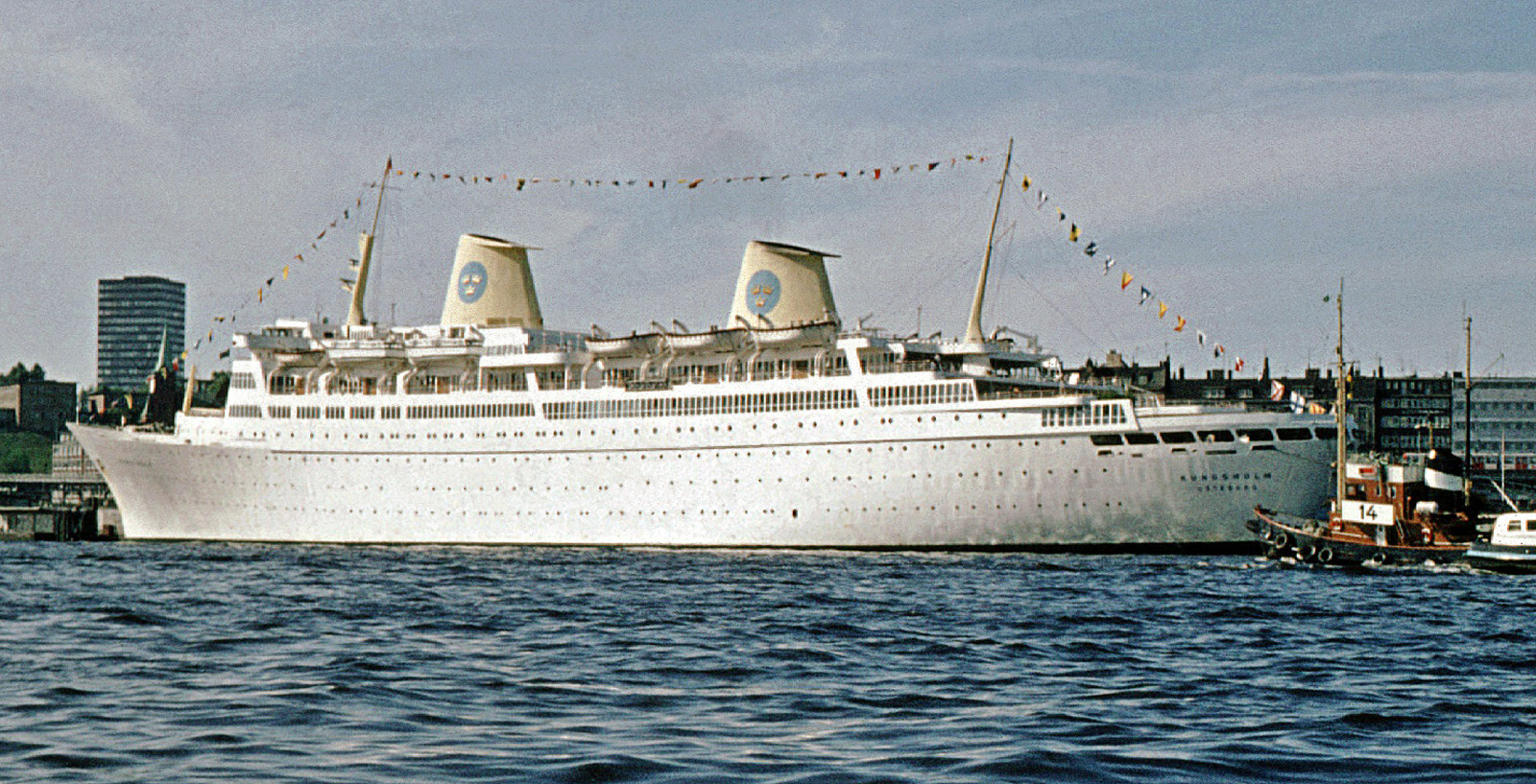
Kungsholm in Hamburg

The Kungsholm was designed by the longtime Swedish American Line technical director Eric Christiansson, who had designed all Swedish American Line new-builds since 1938, and introduced the trademark double stack, streamline profile to the majority of the new ships. John Brown & Company of Clydebank, Scotland was selected to construct the new Kungsholm, and she was launched in 1965. She was fitted with two Swedish-built Götaverken nine-cylinder engines have a combined output of 25,200 shaft horsepower (18,800 kW), which gave her a service speed of 21 knots (39 km/h; 24 mph), although she achieved 25 knots (46 km/h; 29 mph) during her sea trials. The ship was equipped with Denny Brown stabilizers and was one of the handful of British-built liners to have a bulbous bow. The vessel met all updated SOLAS requirements as of the 1992 modifications.

The ship was originally measured at 26,678 gross register tons (GRT). After rebuilding for service with P&O, her tonnage increased to 27,670. Later she was measured at 28,891 gross tonnage (GT). She is 201 metres (659 ft 5 in) long with a breadth of 26.5 metres (86 ft 11 in).

The ship's passenger capacity was 713 as a transatlantic liner, but only 450 as a cruise ship before the addition of extra cabins increased the number of berths to 730. She carried 438 crew members. The maximum capacity utilizing upper (passenger) and lower (crew) berths is 994 persons.

== History ==
=== Kungsholm - Swedish American Line ===
As Kungsholm, the ship first entered service for the Swedish America Line in 1966 as a transatlantic ocean liner, the last liner built for the Gothenburg – New York City run. Although built for transatlantic service, she was also designed to spend a large proportion of the year cruising.

=== Kungsholm - Flagship Cruises ===
In 1975, the Swedish America Line closed its passenger services and Kungsholm was sold to Flagship Cruises, who retained her name and used her for cruising from the United States. She was re-registered in Liberia.

=== Sea Princess - P&O Princess Cruises ===
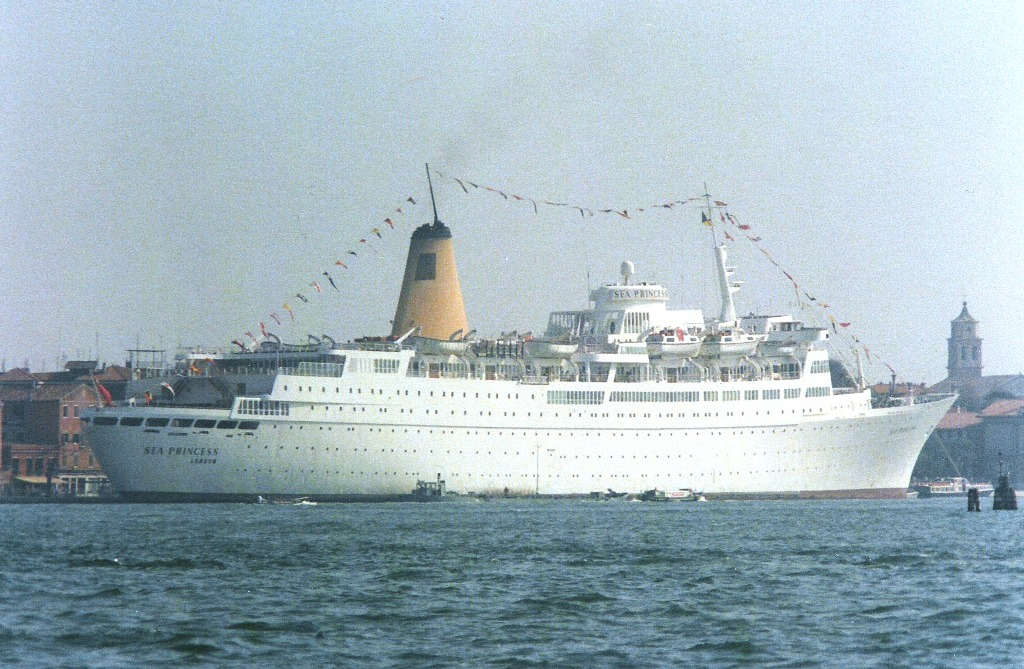
Sea Princess in Venice, Italy 1986

In 1978 she was purchased by P&O and was sent to Vegesack for rebuilding by Bremer Vulkan. She had her appearance dramatically altered by the removal of the dummy forward funnel, reshaping of the remaining funnel, and the addition of extra cabins. Under UK registry her tonnage increased to 27,670 GRT, and she had accommodation for 750 passengers.

She was renamed Sea Princess and initially based in Australia. From 1981 Sea Princess alternated between deployments with P&O's UK fleet and the subsidiary Princess Cruises fleet. Multiple episodes of The Love Boat were filmed on board when deployed in Australia. As her deployments changed, so did the colour of her funnel; buff (yellow) for P&O, white with the Sea Witch logo for Princess Cruises.

=== Victoria - P&O Cruises ===
In 1995 she was renamed Victoria and for the rest of her career with P&O Cruises operated out of Southampton. The name change was to allow a new addition to the Princess Cruises fleet to be named Sea Princess.

In 1999/2000 Victoria was chartered for the Union-Castle Line centenary voyage and had her funnel repainted in that company's livery.

=== Mona Lisa - Holiday Kreuzfahrten ===
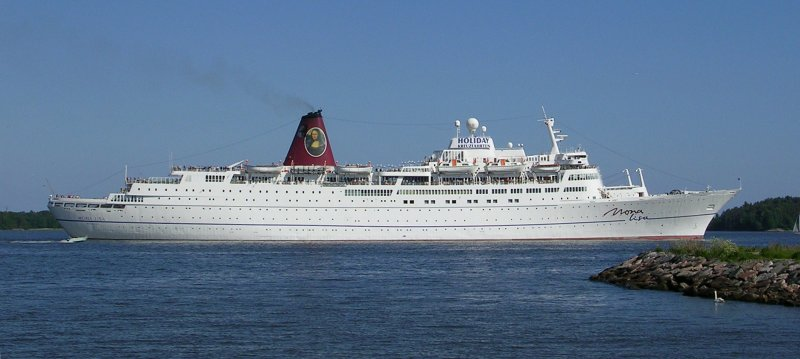
Mona Lisa departing Helsinki, Finland in 2005

In 2002 she was sold by P&O and sailed for Holiday Kreuzfahrten of Düsseldorf as Mona Lisa until 2006, bearing a large image of the painting of the same name on her funnel. On 12 May 2004, in heavy fog, the Mona Lisa got stuck in the San Marco basin in Venice, in front of St Mark's Square. Holiday Kreuzfahrten declared bankruptcy in September 2006. Following the bankruptcy of Holiday Kreuzfahrten, Mona Lisa was briefly laid up at Piraeus, but in November 2006 she was chartered for use as a hotel ship in Doha, Qatar for the duration of the Asian Games. The charter to Qatar ended on 1 January 2007.

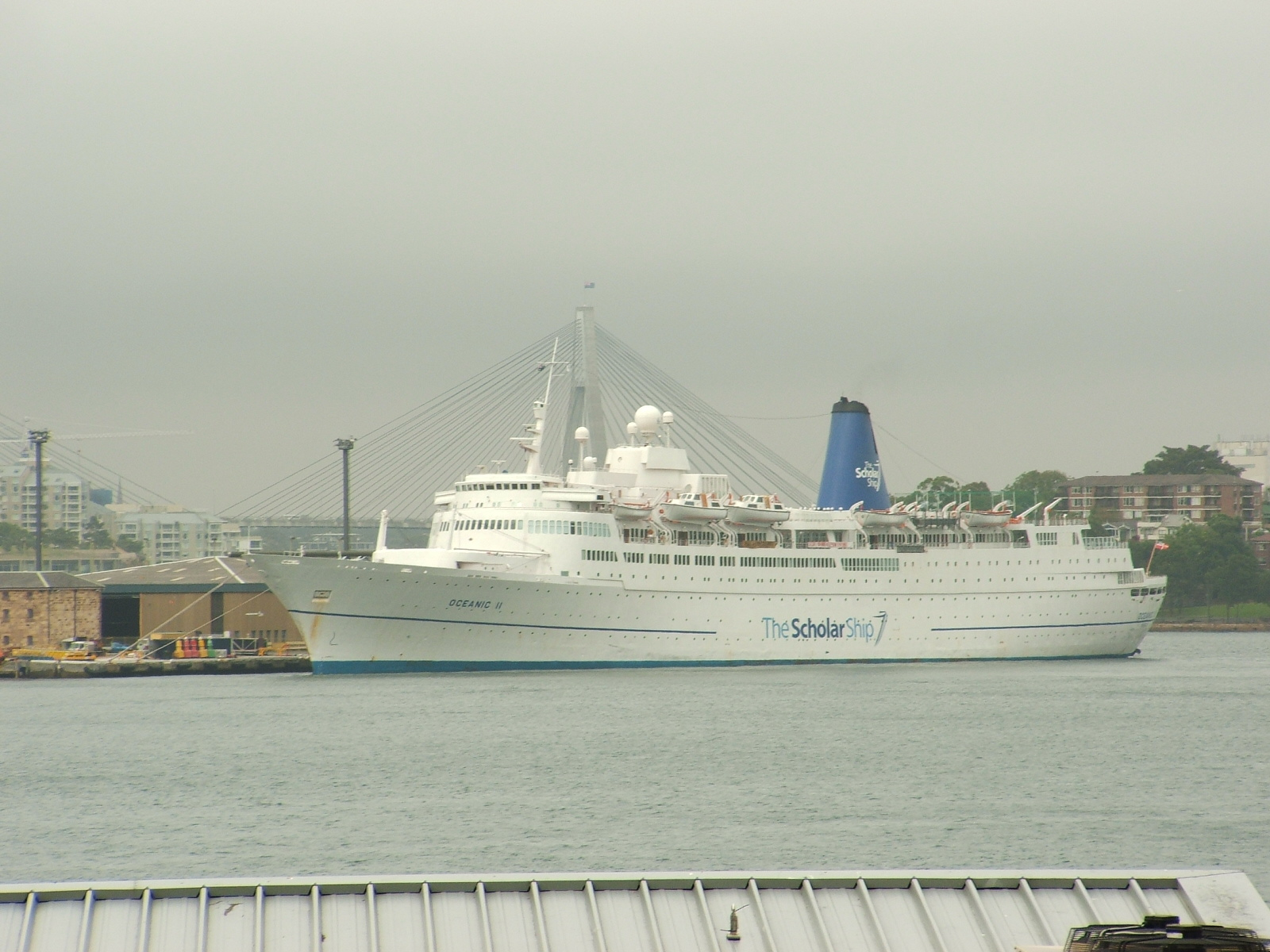
Oceanic II in Sydney Harbour in November 2007

=== Oceanic II ===
In 2007, the ship was chartered by Royal Caribbean Cruises (RCC) and was renamed Oceanic II. From 30 April to 28 May 2007, Louis Hellenic Cruises sub-chartered the ship as a temporary replacement for Sea Diamond, which went aground off the coast of Santorini, Greece and sank earlier in April. Following this she was operated by Pullmantur Cruises (a subsidiary of RCC) for the 2007 Northern Hemisphere summer season.

=== The Scholar Ship ===
The ship was refitted to become an educational vessel for The Scholar Ship international education program, a cooperative venture between seven major world universities and RCC. The Scholar Ship offered undergraduate and graduate semester programs during four-month voyages. The inaugural voyage embarked in September 2007, with a second voyage in early 2008. In June 2008 the discontinuation of the program was announced.

=== Mona Lisa - Lord Nelson Seereisen ===
Oceanic II reverted to the name Mona Lisa prior to her charter to German tour operator Lord Nelson-Seereisen of Erkelenz, Germany, which ran from 28 April to 31 August 2008. On 4 May 2008 Mona Lisa grounded in the Irbe Strait while leaving Riga. She suffered no major damage, but the passengers were evacuated from the ship on 5 May after unsuccessful efforts to free the ship from the sandbank. Mona Lisa was eventually pulled free on 7 May 2008. She subsequently sailed to a drydock in Ventspils, Latvia for inspection and returned to normal cruise traffic on 8 May 2008.

=== Peace Boat ===
Following the completion of her charter to Lord Nelson-Seereisen, Mona Lisa was chartered to Peace Boat for the duration of the 2008/2009 Northern Hemisphere winter season. For the 2009 northern summer season she again returned to Lord Nelson-Seereisen's program.

=== Vancouver Winter Olympics ===
From 26 January to 23 March 2010, Mona Lisa was used as floating accommodation at Squamish, British Columbia, Canada. During the 2010 Winter Olympics and Paralympics in Vancouver and Whistler, approximately 1,400 crew, volunteers and paid staff were housed aboard.

=== Final sailing years ===
She resumed her voyages with Lord Nelson-Seereisen during 2010 from May until August, when her charter ended. Her future was then uncertain as she did not comply with the new SOLAS passenger safety regulations coming into effect in October 2010.

== Retirement ==
=== Potential return to Sweden ===
A letter of intent was signed between the ship's owners and Swedish entrepreneur Lars Hallgren for the acquisition of the ship in 2010. Hallgren planned to use the ship as a floating hotel in Gothenburg. Had his plans been realized, certain features of the Kungsholm's original appearance, such as her two funnels, would have been restored. Hallgren withdrew his offer to purchase Mona Lisa, because the City of Gothenburg would only lease dock space for the ship to be berthed in Gothenburg for five years, and scrap buyers inspected her in the following weeks. However, the city of Stockholm expressed a sudden interest in letting Lars Hallgren berth and preserve Mona Lisa there, first for use as a student accommodation ship and then for use a permanently berthed hotel and museum. These plans ultimately fell through.

=== Veronica - floating hotel ===
After the failed attempt to return the ship to Sweden, she was bought by the Korean Daewoo company and moved to Duqm, Oman to become a floating hotel.Mona Lisa made her way from Germany to Piraeus, in September, 2010. Mona Lisa left Piraeus on October 11, bound for the Suez Canal and for use as an accommodation ship in Oman. She then arrived to Oman on October 26, 2010, where she was renamed Veronica, and spent the next three years until October 2013, as a luxury floating hotel in the wilayat of Duqm. She was then laid up for two years.

=== Scrapping ===
In November 2015 it was reported that although it was still hoped to take her back to Sweden as a hotel ship she had in fact already been sold for scrap and was being towed by the tug Kamarina to the ship breaking yard in Alang, India. She arrived in Alang in November and, after waiting for a high tide and permission to run aground, was scrapped in May 2016.
