= Van Duyne House =

Van Duyne House may refer to:

in Montville, New Jersey and listed on the National Register of Historic Places in Morris County, New Jersey:

- James Van Duyne Farmhouse
- Martin Van Duyne House
- Simon Van Duyne House
- Van Duyne–Jacobus House

Other locations:

- Mead–Van Duyne House, Wayne, New Jersey, formerly listed on the National Register of Historic Places in Passaic County, New Jersey
