= Hank Lyon =

Hank Lyon (born February 13, 1988) is an American Republican Party politician. Lyon joined the Morris County, New Jersey Board of Chosen Freeholders on March 10, 2012, and served a special one-year term on the board, becoming the youngest freeholder in the state at age 24. Lyon was reelected as Freeholder in 2014.

A resident of the Towaco section of Montville, Lyon majored in economics and physics at the College of the Holy Cross.

After a court battle in which Nordstron sought to overturn Lyon's victory in the Republican Party primary after his narrow ten-vote victory, Lyon was appointed to the seat that had been held by Margaret Nordstrom. The court battle was due to Lyon not following election rules regarding disclosing campaign finances. Lyon ran unopposed in the 2014 Republican primary. Lyon is a member of the Board of School Estimate for the County College of Morris and the Morris County School of Technology.

== Policy ==
During his tenure on the Morris County Board of Chosen Freeholders from 2012 to 2018, Lyon fought to stabilize taxes, reduce debt, and maintain funding for law enforcement, education, human services, and infrastructure improvements.

In 2012, Lyon was the only freeholder who voted against the proposed county budget, which included tax hikes.

As chairman of the Freeholder Budget Committee in 2013, Lyon authored a county budget that kept property taxes flat for the first time in a generation while maintaining funding for essential programs and reducing debt. Lyon successfully championed similar budgets with zero-percent county tax increases in 2014 and 2015 budgets.
