= Martin Van Duyne House =

- U.S. National Register of Historic Places
- New Jersey Register of Historic Places
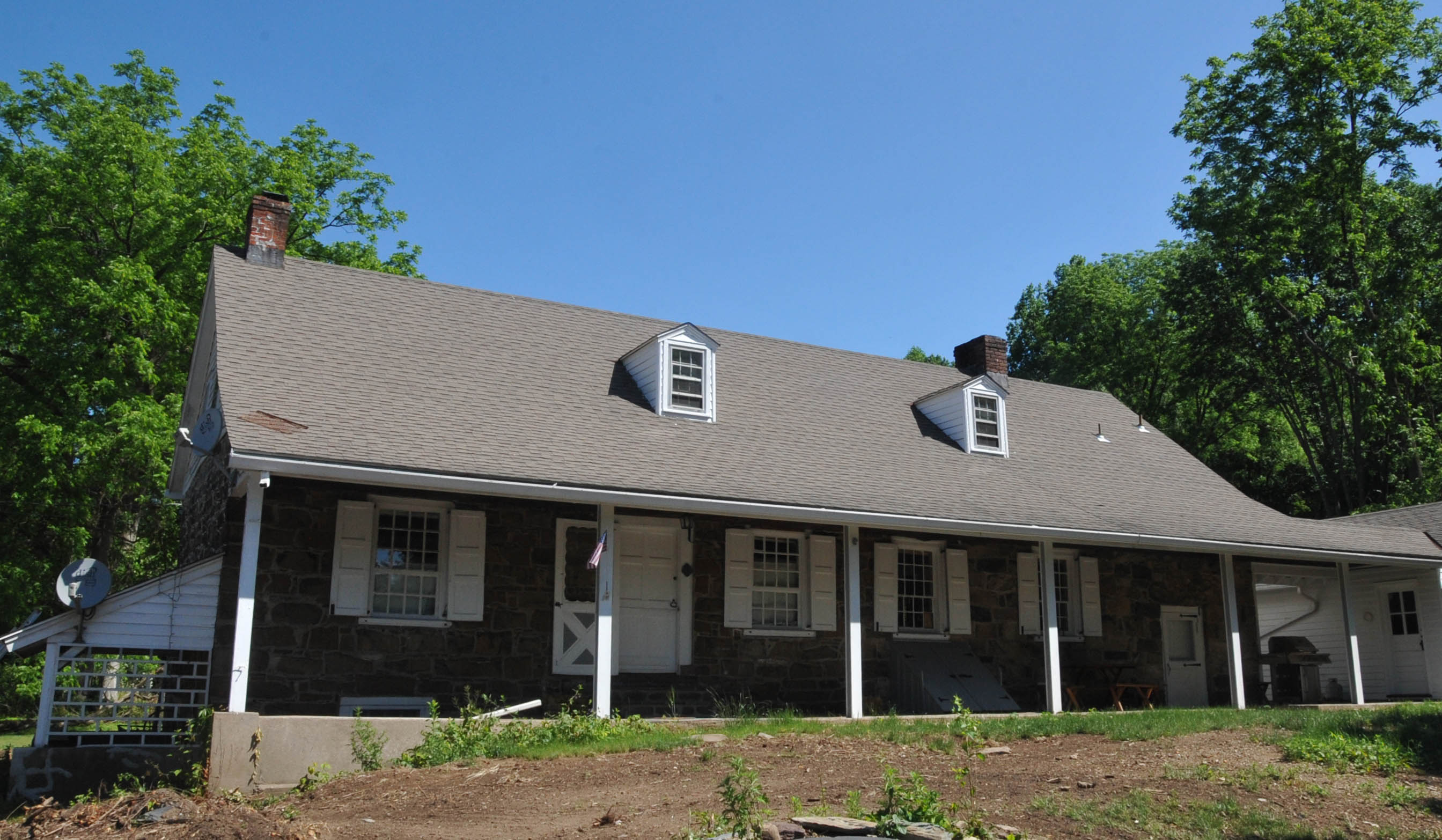

- Location within Morris County, New Jersey Location within New Jersey Location within the United States
- Location: 292 Main Road; Montville, New Jersey
- Coordinates: 40°54′59″N 74°22′15″W
- Built: c. 1750
- Architectural style: Colonial, Dutch Colonial
- MPS: Dutch Stone Houses in Montville MPS
- NRHP reference No.: 91001935
- NJRHP No.: 2163

Significant dates
- Added to NRHP: January 17, 1992
- Designated NJRHP: November 25, 1991

The Martin Van Duyne House is a stone farmhouse located at 292 Main Road (U.S. Route 202) in the township of Montville in Morris County, New Jersey. The oldest section was built around 1750. It was documented as the Abraham Van Duyne House by the Historic American Buildings Survey in 1938. It was added to the National Register of Historic Places on January 17, 1992, for its significance in architecture, and was listed as part of the Dutch Stone Houses in Montville Multiple Property Submission (MPS).

== History and description ==
James Van Duyne lived in the Towaco section of Montville. His son, Martin J. Van Duyne, inherited the property in 1811. The stone farmhouse was built around 1750 and features local Dutch Colonial architecture. It was extended around 1790 with a wing on the east side.

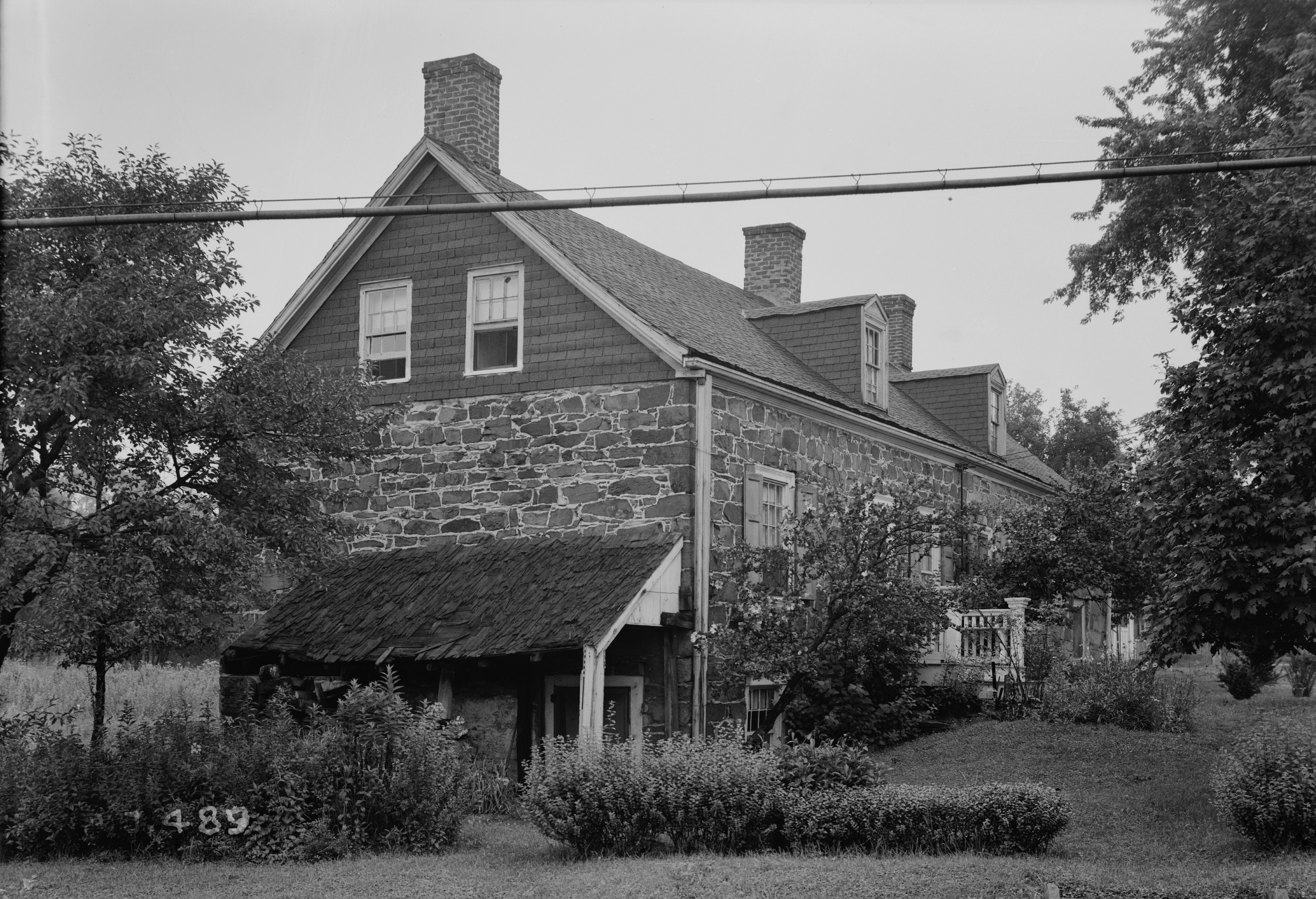
HABS photo from 1938

== See also ==
- National Register of Historic Places listings in Morris County, New Jersey
- List of the oldest buildings in New Jersey
