= Regan Ryzuk =

American composer and pianist

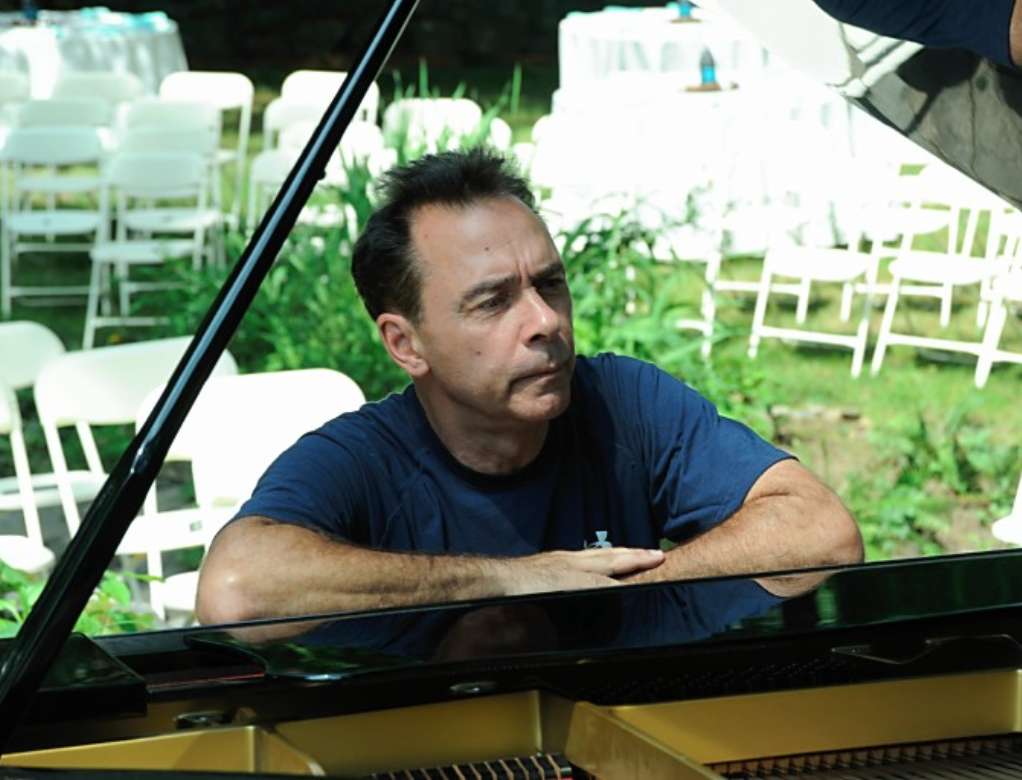
A photo of Regan Ryzuk, taken by photographer Eduardo Patino for Ryzuk's AllAboutJazz.com feature.

Regan Ryzuk (born Regan Onufry Ryzuk, March 29, 1955, New York) is an American composer and pianist. Ryzuk is the son of renowned painter, Onufry Ryzuk and published author and playwright, Mary S. Ryzuk, PhD. He is the elder of two children.

== Education ==
A graduate from Montville Township High School in Montville, New Jersey in 1973, Ryzuk studied with Robert Helps at Manhattan School of Music and attended The Juilliard School. Ryzuk's classical music studies led to jazz studies with Jaki Byard and Sir Roland Hanna. At Juilliard, he studied music theory and composition.

== Career ==
=== Development as a composer ===
During the 1980s, Ryzuk toured with various ballet companies – traveling through Europe and Latin America. This period enabled him to develop his improvisational techniques, which later laid the groundwork for one of his greatest compositional works,"48 Preludes and Fugues." Composed in the style Johann Sebastian Bach, Ryzuk developed "48 Preludes and Fugues" over the course of a year while living in Switzerland.

Upon his return to the United States in 1991, Ryzuk lived in New York and continued his compositional work. He developed a base of students, including Fountains of Wayne co-founder, Adam Schlesinger. Ryzuk periodically returned to Europe to study and develop compositions; for example he lived in Germany in 1994, where he wrote "Piano Fantasy in D♭," and made fairly frequent trip to London between 2000 and 2005 while writing a musical based on Jack the Ripper.

Around the year 2000 Ryzuk became a founding partner in a TV/film music production company known as SOUNDGUILD, which operated for approximately ten years. Ryzuk's work from this period is featured in over 500 television and movie projects through his work with Zomba Music, including Kissing Jessica Stein, Chasing Papi, The Night Listener, 60 Minutes, and American Idol. He also provided music for Extreme Music Library, LTD.

=== Musicals and theater ===
Ryzuk collaborated on a number of musicals with mother Mary S. Ryzuk, including some of Grimm's Fairy Tales and a full-length, fully orchestrated musical based on the novel The Lodger. The musical was initially titled Jack the Ripper, then was changed to share the name of the novel The Lodger, before finally receiving in current title, "Hunt: A Musical Thriller." Ryzuk also wrote the music and the book for Joe's Bar, with additional lyrics by Mary S. Ryzuk.

In about 1995, Ryzuk co-founded the theater company Enchanted Players, which operated until 2010. When the theater company moved to the Darress Theatre in Boonton, New Jersey in 2008, Ryzuk became Composer in Residence for the theater until the Enchanted Players became inactive.

== Associated acts ==
- Grover Kemble
- Ian David
- Emanuel Kallins
- Barbara McCarthy
- New Jersey Ballet
- Carmen Artis
- Rio Clemente
- Cindy Lee

== Awards and honors ==
- 1980 Kean College Jazz Composition and Performance Award
- 2004-2005 Perry Awards for Joe's Bar - Outstanding Musical Direction, Outstanding Production of an Original Musical,

== Education ==
- Manhattan School of Music
- Juilliard School of Music
- Studied Under: Jaki Byard, Steven Citron, Sir Roland Hanna, Robert Helps, Henry Rauch, Ernst Ulmer and Stanley Wolfe

== Films ==
- Chasing Papi
- Kissing Jessica Stein
- The Night Listener

== Partial List of Opus Numbers ==
- Op. 1, Prelude in C Major (1969)
- Op. 2, 5 Preludes for Piano (1974)
- Op. 3, Etude In F Major Essay For 5 Players (1974; lost)
- Op. 4, Phase Quartet works and Midnight Madness - Ostentation- Seven Eleven- Vibes- Axis- Irrational Funk- Coalescence (1978; lost)
- Op. 5, Duologues For Piano & Drums, Tangent Freeze- Wind Chimes, Michele, Dancing Colors, In a Wheat Field, Grandmother's Rocking Chair, Waltz, and Lydian Play (1979)
- Op. 6, 10 Pieces For Children (lost), Trio Comprovisations, and Felicity- Elena (1979)
- Op. 7, Angularities (1980)
- Op. 8, Arsis Atmospheres, Ballad Blue, Rollands Romp, and Elaine (1980)
- Op. 9, Amorphous Moment For Piano, Music For Flute and Piano, Brief Fantasy For Flute and Piano, Short Essay For String Quartet, and Games For Flute and Piano (1981)
- Op. 10, Chiaroscuro, Moment For String Quartet, Raindrops On The Water For Piano (1981)
- Op. 11, 6 Impromptus, Romanze For Strings, The Stress of Juilliard, Parlour Intrigues For Violin and Piano, Brief Fantasy For Clarinet and Piano, and Shadows For Clarinet and Piano (1981)
- Op. 12, Toccatina, 2 Short Pieces For Wind Quartet, Air For Clarinet, Pulse, Darkness For Piano, Tango, Sunshower, Swingerphism, Anabasis (1981 / 1982)
- Op. 13, Grand Grand Russian Fairytale For Two Pianos, Several Waltzes For Piano, Adagios For Piano, and 3 Mazurkas For Piano (1983)
- Op. 14, Etude In D♯ Minor, Scratch Counterpoint, At The Barre Again, Struggle On The Ivories, Tango Under The Fireworks (1984)
- Op. 15, Piano Fantasy In D♭ Major- Choreographed by Graziela Kozak (1985)
- Op. 16, Peridance Rag (1985)
- Op. 17, Lyric Setting For Winds and Strings (1985)
- Op. 18, Veil Of Dawn- Choreographed by Igal Perry (1986)
- Op. 19, String Quartet Miniatures and 4 Preludes For Piano B♭ Major, C♯ Minor E Minor, C Minor (1987)
- Op. 20, 3 Mazurkas For Piano More Adagios For Piano (1988)
- Op. 21, Prothalamion No. 1 In D♭ Major.....(4 Hands on 1 Piano) and The Fifth Wife- A Musical song contribution and Pas de deux- Choreographed by Igal Perry (1989)
- Op. 22, 48 Preludes & Fugues (1990)
- Op. 23, Fantasy For Flute and Piano (1991)
- Op. 24, The Devil & The Three Golden Hairs, Fortune's Favorite (1993)
  1. Near You-
  2. Good-bye Fortune's Favorite
  3. The Letter
  4. The Forest
  5. Sound The Wedding Bells
  6. Three Golden Hairs
  7. Meeting The Watchman
  8. The Devil's Song
  9. Finale
- Op. 25, Rapunzel: Full-Length Musical (1994)
  1. What's A Fairytale?
  2. If Only
  3. I Think I'll Die
  4. If I Steal
  5. Am I so Scary, Then?
  6. Rapunzel
  7. Come Sing With Me
  8. A Prince Of A Guy
  9. Was That A Dream I Heard?
  10. Let Down Your Hair
  11. What Is A Man?
  12. My Prince, My Love, My Own
  13. Miracle Of Love
  14. Like Me, Like You
  15. Finale
- Op. 26, Hansel & Gretel: Full-Length Musical
  1. We Get Along
  2. Bringing Famine
  3. Come Play With Me
  4. Thanksgiving Dinner
  5. There's A Wicked Witch
  6. Who's That?
  7. Abandoning The Children
  8. We Must Leave Them
  9. The Forest
  10. Why Are We Alone?
  11. Fly Beautiful Bird
  12. Who Is Nibbling On My House?
  13. Help Yourself
  14. Run For Your Life
  15. Don't Be Afraid
  16. What Sweet Children
  17. We Must Be In Heaven
- Op. 27, 3 Barcarolles (1994)
- Op. 28, Sleeping Beauty: Full-Length Musical (1995)
  1. Royalty Does Not Guarantee
  2. Useless
  3. Maybe A Wish
  4. Magic
  5. The Princess Rose Lullaby
  6. Sisters Are We
  7. The Threat
  8. The Gifts
  9. The Curse
  10. All The Spindles
  11. Take Heart
  12. Briar Rose
  13. Merry Maid
  14. The Seduction
  15. I've Won
  16. The Prince And The Hedge
  17. While You Sleep
  18. Grow Briar Hedge, Grow
  19. The Legend Of Briar Rose
  20. Beware Sweet Prince
  21. That's What Dreams Are Made Of
  22. Another Curse
  23. Finale
- Op. 29, Spy City (1995)
  1. Spy City
  2. 10 Original Big Band Charts Manhattan On The Rocks
  3. Crosstown Caper
  4. Dame With A Twist
  5. Private Dick
  6. Night Beat
  7. In Pursuit
  8. City Of Desire
- Op. 30, Etude in B♭ Major (1996)
- Op. 31, Little Red Riding Cap: Full-Length Musical (1996)
  1. These Dark Forbidding Woods
  2. Sweet Little Maid
  3. Little Red Riding Cap
  4. My Own Private Song
  5. The Big Bad Wolf
  6. Catching The Wolf
  7. The Wolf's Song
  8. A Visit To Granny
  9. Don't Stray From The Path
  10. It's Off To Granny's House
  11. All For Me
  12. The Forest Sequence
  13. Flowers, Lovely Flowers
  14. I'll Take This Road
  15. I'll Fool The Little Girl
  16. What Big Ears You Have
  17. The Rescue
  18. Getting Away
  19. Finale
- Op. 32, Rumpelstiltskin: Full-Length Musical (1997)
  1. Tiny Town
  2. I'm Somebody
  3. King Special's Song
  4. Always Boasting
  5. Poor Lass
  6. Lass Lament
  7. What Will You Give Me?
  8. Spinning Gold Sequence
  9. Avarice
  10. Give Me Your Child
  11. The Wedding
  12. Names
  13. Rumpelstiltskin
- Op. 33, Snow White & Rose Red: Full-Length Musical (1998)
  1. Heigh Ho Night Song
  2. Wake Up
  3. Fantasy Of Dreams
  4. A Little Warmth
  5. Spare My Life
  6. We'll Never Play Rough Again
  7. Wake Up
  8. Searching
  9. If Only You Could
  10. Please Don't Cry
  11. Gathering Berries
  12. The Gnome Sequence
  13. Don't Do It
  14. Peace, Be Here
  15. Gnome's Fury
  16. Finale
- Op. 34, Jack The Ripper: Full-Length Musical Fully orchestrated (1999)
- Op. 35, Making Snow, A Short Christmas Musical Christmas Eve Dinner, I'll Try To Stay Up For Santa, A Letter To Santa, Making Snow, Vocal Fugue 2000, and Only The Beauty Remains
- Op. 36, Trios for Oboe Bass & Piano, Birth Of A Child: an Art Song for Voice and Piano (2001)
- Op. 37, The Pied Piper: A Short Children's Musical, Aubade No.1 (2001)
- Op. 38, Endless Ages For Orchestra (2003)
- Op. 39, Barcarolle No. 4, 6 Mazurkas For Piano, Waltz For Piano, 6 Lyricisms For Piano (2005)
- Op. 40, Joe's Bar: Full-Length Musical- Music / Lyrics Jazz Quartet Arrangement, Joe's Bar: Full-Length Musical (2005)
  1. She's So Beautiful
  2. I Like You
  3. To Me
  4. Now And Then
  5. I Want
  6. Love's A Kick In The Pants
  7. Drinks
  8. Midnight In N.Y.
  9. Quitin' Time
  10. Just One Girl
  11. Maybe It's Me
  12. Why Doesn't He Call?
  13. Let Songs Fill Your Mind
  14. Hangover Blues
  15. Men
  16. Women
  17. All I know
  18. Should We Try
- Op. 41, Regan Ryzuk Septet: New Concepts (2007)
  1. Storm In The Desert
  2. Subterfugue
  3. Light Musik
  4. Mideast Rest
  5. Sharing Three Thoughts
  6. Be Bop To Go
  7. A Dubious Cafe In Dubai
  8. Unfamiliar Territory
- Op. 42, Prothalamion No. 2 In G♭ Major For Violin, Cello and Piano 20 Lyricisms For Piano Opus 43 2010 Standards Music and Lyrics, Tip Top, That Look, In A Lonesome Mood, Come On -My Dream, No Mystery To Me, Blue Sunday, Tell Me That You Love Me, Lovely Together, Love Song, and Stay (2009)
- Op. 44, 3 Sonatas (2008)
1. Sonata No. 1 1st Mvt ("Fanfare")
2. Sonata No. 1 2nd Mvt ("First Love")
3. Sonata No. 1 3rd Mvt ("The Magician")
- Op. 45, 3 Sonatas, (2008)
1. Sonata No. 2 1st Mvt ("A Night Carnival")
2. Sonata No. 2 2nd Mvt ("March In The Gulag")
3. Sonata No. 2 3rd Mvt ("Ostinato")
- Op. 46, 4 Sonatas (2009)
1. Sonata No. 3 1st Mvt ("A Winter Sleighride")
2. Sonata No. 3 2nd Mvt ("Surviving Hell")
3. Sonata No. 3 3rd Mvt ("The Busy Anthill")
4. Sonata No. 3 4th Mvt ("A Heroes Welcome")
- Op. 47, 3 Sonatas (2009)
1. Sonata No. 4 1st Mvt ("Dance Of The Gladiators")
2. Sonata No. 4 2nd Mvt ("After Rain On A Lake")
3. Sonata No. 4 3rd Mvt ("The Determined Matador")
- Op. 48, 3 Sonatas (2009)
1. Sonata No. 5 1st Mvt ("A Walk Through An Old Garden")
2. Sonata No. 5 2nd Mvt ("The Haunted Library")
3. Sonata No. 5 3rd Mvt ("Fountains")
- Op. 49, 3 Sonatas (2010)
1. Sonata No. 6 1st Mvt ("The Victorious Warrior")
2. Sonata No. 6 2nd Mvt ("Great Expectations")
3. Sonata No. 6 3rd Mvt ("Dragonflies On A Lake")

Epi-Cycles Beyond The Kuiper Belt (A Fugue For Large String Orchestra)

- Op. 50, 4 Sonatas (2010)
1. Sonata No. 7 1st Mvt ("A Silent Film")
2. Sonata No. 7 2nd Mvt ("The Relentless Clock")
3. Sonata No. 7 3rd Mvt ("A Ride In The Country")
4. Sonata No. 7 4th Mvt ("The Cat And The String")
- Op. 51, 4 Sonatas (2010)
1. Sonata No. 8 1st Mvt ("Children At Play")
2. Sonata No. 8 2nd Mvt ("A Nursery Rhyme")
3. Sonata No. 8 3rd Mvt ("A Piece Of String")
4. Sonata No. 8 4th Mvt ("Journey Of The Monarch")
- Op. 52, 2 Sonatas (2010)
1. Sonata No. 9 1st Mvt ("Strolling Through A Gallery")
2. Sonata No. 9 2nd Mvt ("The Walk Along Lake Louise")
- Op. 53, 4 Sonatas (2010)
1. Sonata No.10 ("A Comfortable Nightmare")
2. Sonata No. 1 1st Mvt ("Fanfare")
3. Sonata No. 1 2nd Mvt ("First Love")
4. Sonata No. 1 3rd Mvt ("The Magician")
- Op. 54, The Bridge At Vladivostok: a One-Movement Symphonic Work (2012)
- Op. 55, Piano Concerto 3 Mvts. For Piano and Full Orchestra (2013)
- Op. 56, Intelligent Designs For Piano- No. 1 Newspeak and Pectin: A Brief Fantasy For Orchestra (2013)
