= Scott Shields =

Scott Shields may refer to:

- Scott Shields (musician) (born 1969), Scottish musician and producer
- Scott Shields (activist), American blogger and Democratic Party political activist
- Scott Shields (American football) (born 1976), American football player
- Scot Shields (born 1975), Major League Baseball pitcher
