= Len Saunders =

American activist

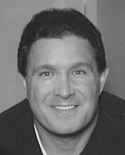
Author, Len Saunders

Len Saunders is a retired physical education teacher who is currently a childhood health, fitness, and wellness advocate. He is known for creating Project ACES, a day in which children around the world exercise simultaneously on the first Wednesday of May. He created a new program called PACES Day, which motivates parents and children to exercise together over the weekends. In 2009, Len created another program called Exercise US (United States), which motivated children in the United States to exercise for 10 continuous hours, starting on the east coast of the US, ending 10 hours later on the west coast. Saunders is also the author of 9 books, all on the topic of children's health and fitness. His most recent book came out in August 2022 called Coach Lenny's School Tips. After 40 years in education, Saunders retired as a P.E. teacher from the Valley View Elementary School in Montville, New Jersey. Valley View was the first school to participate in Project ACES Day and continues to participate every year. He served as a consultant to The President's Council On Physical Fitness & Sports. Most recently, he became an American Heart Association expert spokesperson on the issue of childhood obesity and childhood fitness.

== Authored articles and books ==
Len Saunders is a regular contributor to online publications, including U.S. News & World Report, Fox News, PBS Parents and Yahoo Shine Healthy Living.
