= Van Duyne =

Van Duyne may refer to:

- Beth Van Duyne (born 1970), American politician
- Bob Van Duyne (born 1952), American American football player
- Carl Van Duyne (1946–83), American sailor
- LeRoy Van Duyne (1923–2003), American politician

== See also ==
- Van Duyne House (disambiguation)
