= Jim Price (tight end) =

American football player (born 1966)

No. 87, 89
- Position: Tight end

Personal information
- Born: October 2, 1966 (age 60); Englewood, New Jersey, U.S.
- Listed height: 6 ft 4 in (1.93 m)
- Listed weight: 247 lb (112 kg)

Career information
- High school: Montville (Montville, New Jersey)
- College: Stanford
- NFL draft: 1990: undrafted

Career history
- Los Angeles Rams (1990–1993); Dallas Cowboys (1993); St. Louis Rams (1995)

Awards and highlights
- Super Bowl champion (XXVIII); Second-team All-Pac-10 (1989)

Career NFL statistics
- Receptions: 74
- Receiving yards: 767
- Touchdowns: 4
- Stats at Pro Football Reference

James G. Price (born October 2, 1966) is an American former professional football player who was a tight end in the National Football League (NFL) for the Los Angeles Rams, Dallas Cowboys and the St. Louis Rams. He played college football for the Stanford Cardinal.

== Early life ==
Price grew up in Montville, New Jersey and played high school football at Montville Township High School, where he was a teammate of future NFL defensive end Lester Archambeau.

He also played baseball and basketball.

== College career ==
Price accepted a football scholarship from Stanford University. As a freshman, he was a reserve player behind Eric Snelson, making six receptions for 50 yards.

As a sophomore, he was named the starter at tight end, collecting 15 receptions for 235 yards and four receiving touchdowns (tied for eighth in the Pac-10). As a junior, he had 13 receptions for 126 yards and three receiving touchdowns.

His best year came as a senior, recording 45 receptions (second on the team and tied for eighth in the Pac-10) for 391 yards (third on the team) and no receiving touchdowns. He played his best game that season against Notre Dame, tying a school record with 14 catches. He finished his college career with 79 receptions for 802 yards and eight touchdowns.

He also practiced baseball, where he was a starting pitcher for two seasons, which included the 1987 National Championship team.

== Professional career ==
=== Los Angeles Rams ===
Price was signed as an undrafted free agent by the Los Angeles Rams after the 1990 NFL draft. On October 3, he was signed to the practice squad.

In 1991, he started six games, while posting 34 receptions (third on the team) for 410 yards and two touchdowns. On November 25, he suffered a fractured right fibula against the San Francisco 49ers in the twelfth game of the season. On November 26, he was placed on the injured reserve list.

In 1992, he tallied 35 receptions (fourth on the team) for 324 yards and two touchdowns.

In 1993, he had a contract holdout for 51 days, and although he was signed on September 6, he didn't play that year for the Rams, sitting out three games and being declared inactive for one contest. On October 5, he was traded to the Dallas Cowboys in exchange for a sixth-round draft choice (#189-Ronald Edwards).

=== Dallas Cowboys ===
In 1993, the Dallas Cowboys acquired Price after losing three backup tight ends to season-ending injuries, reuniting him with offensive coordinator Norv Turner, who was the Rams' wide receivers and tight ends coach in 1990. He was used mostly as a blocking tight end and appeared in 3 games, registering one reception for four yards. On October 31, he suffered a torn peroneal tendon injury against the Philadelphia Eagles. On November 10, he was placed on the injured reserve list and was replaced with Scott Galbraith. The team would go on to win Super Bowl XXVIII. He was declared a free agent after the season and wasn't re-signed.

=== St. Louis Rams ===
On June 2, 1995, he was signed as a free agent by the St. Louis Rams, after being out of football for a year. He appeared in 13 games, making 6 receptions for 4 yards. He wasn't re-signed after the season.

== Personal life ==
Price became a talent agent in Los Angeles, representing actors, directors and writers. His brother Bob Price played tight end in the Canadian Football League.
