= Ashley Lauren Fisher =

American model

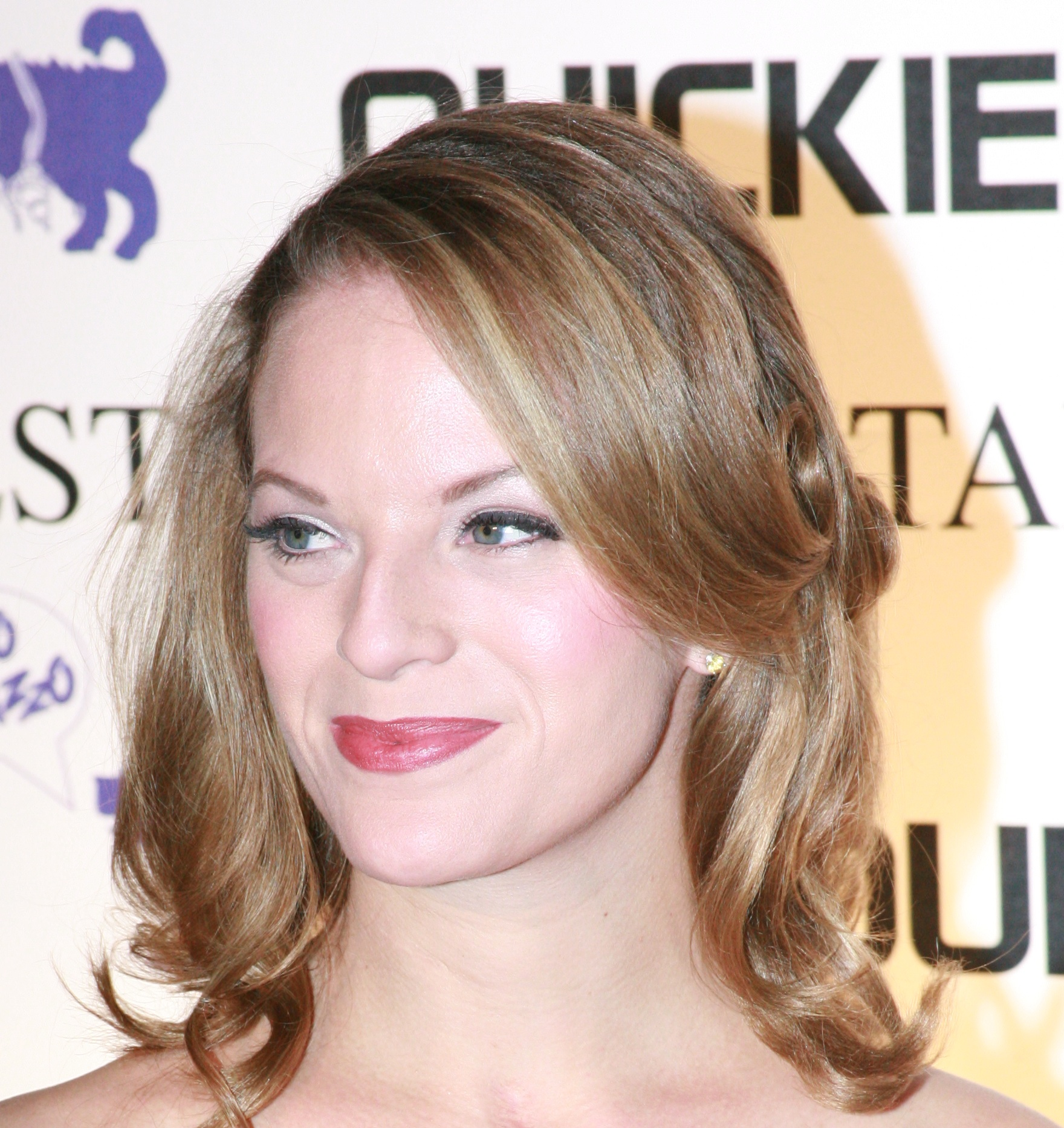
- Born: February 23, 1975 (age 51); Montville, New Jersey, U.S.
- Occupations: Model; Restaurateur
- Years active: 1998–present

Ashley Lauren Fisher (born February 23, 1975, Montville, New Jersey) is an American model, co-founder and chairwoman of Discovery Through Design, a non-profit organization that creates awareness and raises funds for disabled women's health initiatives and spinal cord research, and a former actress, and restaurateur.

== Background ==
Fisher was born and raised in Montville, New Jersey, and was inducted into the Montville Township High School Hall of Fame in 2011. She has performed in Carnegie Hall and Steinway Hall, on MTV, and modeled with NYC agencies. Her mother is originally from England and her father from Jamaica; they met in London prior to their move to the U.S. Fisher has one brother.

In 1998, she and her boyfriend Larry ran an upscale Italian restaurant in New Jersey called Pazzo Pazzo.

On July 12, 1998, Fisher experienced a spinal cord injury after diving into shallow water near the Jersey Shore. She became a tetraplegic.

== Philanthropy ==
With other women, Fisher co-founded Discovery Through Design which has raised almost a million dollars for spinal cord research. She is also an organizer of Rolling with Style, a fashion show for women with disabilities.

The Morris County (New Jersey) Chamber of Commerce named Fisher "Female Legend of Morris County" in 2009. She gave the keynote address at DiscoverAbility, the New Jersey Governor's Conference on Employment for People with Disabilities.
