= James Van Duyne Farmhouse =

- U.S. National Register of Historic Places
- New Jersey Register of Historic Places
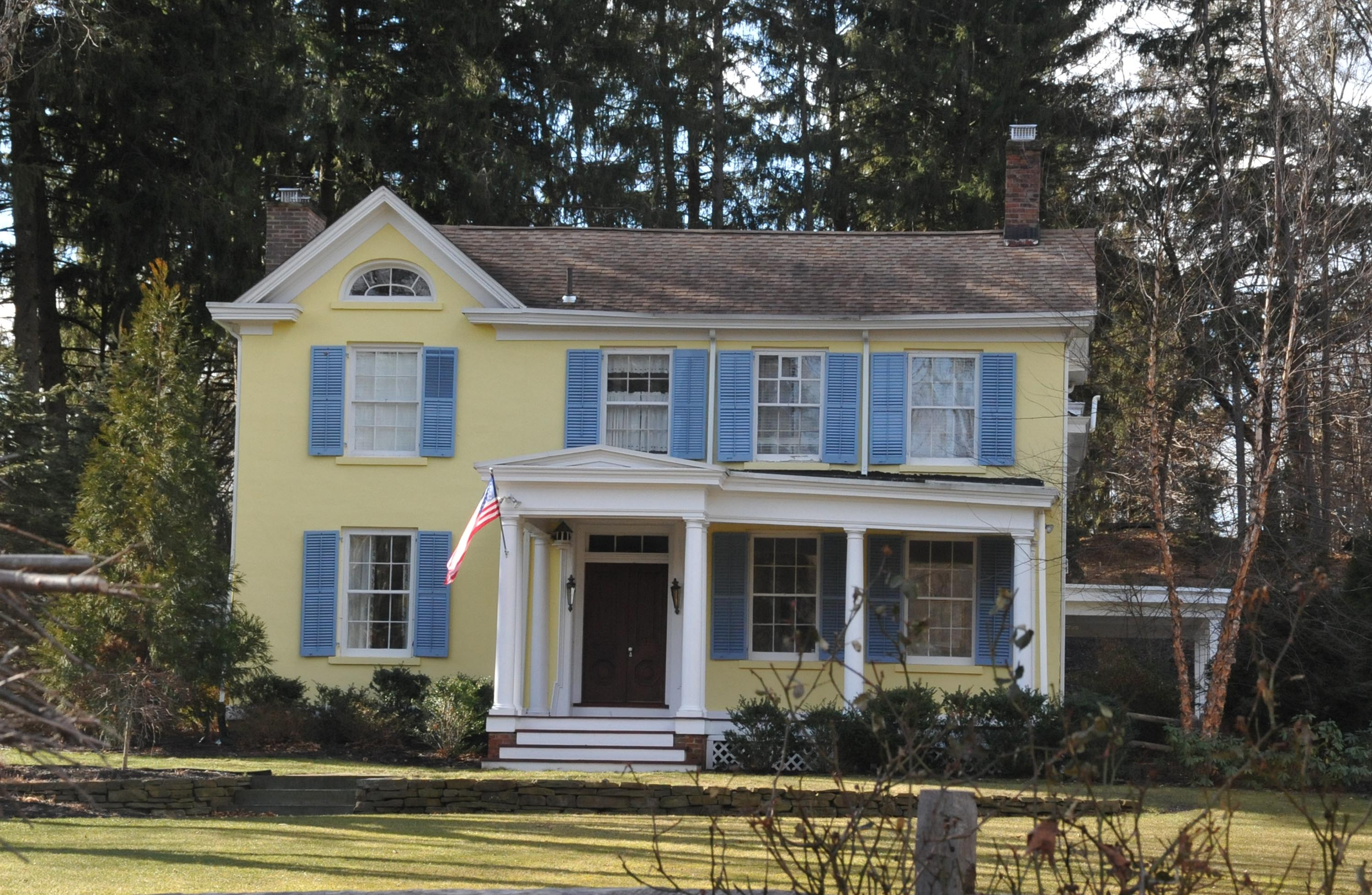

- Location within Morris County, New Jersey Location within New Jersey Location within the United States
- Location: 32 Waughaw Road; Towaco, New Jersey
- Coordinates: 40°55′32″N 74°20′54″W
- Built: 1758
- NRHP reference No.: 82003289
- NJRHP No.: 2164

Significant dates
- Added to NRHP: April 15, 1982
- Designated NJRHP: January 14, 1982

The James Van Duyne Farmhouse is a historic building located at 32 Waughaw Road in the Towaco section of the township of Montville in Morris County, New Jersey. The oldest section of the farmhouse was built in 1758. It was added to the National Register of Historic Places on April 15, 1982, for its significance in exploration/settlement and politics/government.

== History and description ==
Martin Van Duyne purchased the land from Jacob Temont in 1730. His son, James Van Duyne, acquired the property in 1760. He likely built the house in 1758. His son, Ralph Van Duyne, inherited the property in 1811. His son, John R. Van Duyne, inherited it in 1826. The house was extended in 1857 by a two and one-half story stone wing. John's son, Harrison Van Duyne, inherited the house in 1874. He was the speaker of the New Jersey General Assembly in 1881. The house was extended again in 1898.

== See also ==
- National Register of Historic Places listings in Morris County, New Jersey
- List of the oldest buildings in New Jersey
