= Montville Township High School =

High school in Morris County, New Jersey, US

Location
- 100 Horseneck Road; Montville, Morris Township, New Jersey 07045; United States; 40.8936°N 74.3602°W

Information
- Type: Public high school
- Motto: "You Can't Hide From Mustang Pride"
- Established: 1968
- School district: Montville Township School District
- NCES School ID: 341065004332
- Principal: Kenneth Nadzak
- Faculty: 106.00 FTEs
- Grades: 9-12
- Enrollment: 1,035 (as of 2024–25)
- Student to teacher ratio: 9.76:1
- Colors: Green and white
- Athletics conference: Northwest Jersey Athletic Conference (general); North Jersey Super Football Conference (football)
- Team name: Mustangs
- Newspaper: The Podium
- Yearbook: Traces
- Website: www.montville.net/o/high-school

Montville Township High School is a four-year comprehensive public high school located in Montville Township, in suburban Morris County, in the U.S. state of New Jersey. The school was founded in 1971 and serves students in ninth through twelfth grades as the lone secondary school of the Montville Township School District. The school has been accredited by the Middle States Association of Colleges and Schools Commission on Elementary and Secondary Schools since 1975.

As of the 2024–25 school year, the school had an enrollment of 1,035 students and 106.0 classroom teachers (on an FTE basis), for a student–teacher ratio of 9.76:1. There were 38 students (3.6% of enrollment) eligible for free lunch and 7 (0.67% of students) eligible for reduced-cost lunch.

== History ==
MTHS was founded in 1968 with only a ninth grade class; previously, high school students from the township attended nearby Boonton High School. For the first two years of its existence the school was lodged in what was then referred to as Central School (now named Robert R. Lazar School, located on Changebridge Road, within sight of the new high school). An additional grade was added in each of the following three years. In September 1970, the student body moved into the new building (located on Horseneck Road), built on what was formerly The Sunset Dairy Farm, a.k.a. Sisco Tract; constructed at a cost of $4 million (equivalent to $33.2 million in 2025), the new facility opened with only classrooms open and no gym, library or other facilities completed. The initial class to complete all four years at MTHS graduated in 1972.

The first principal of the High School was Dr. Arthur Dermer, followed by Dr. Timothy Dyas. Another long-serving principal was Dr. Clifford Keezer. After the initial recruitment of a high school staff in 1968, the Montville School District gradually added to the faculty as it became a full four-year school.

The mascot adopted by the Board of Education for the high school suitably fit with the several horse/riding farms within the township.

The auditorium of the High School is named in honor of Dr. Robert O. Stafford, who was raised in the township and was a long-time teacher and administrator at MTHS.

== Awards, recognition and rankings ==
In its listing of "America's Best High Schools 2016", the school was ranked 198th out of 500 best high schools in the country; it was ranked 31st among all high schools in New Jersey and 15th among the state's non-magnet schools.

In its 2013 report on "America's Best High Schools", The Daily Beast ranked the school 415th in the nation among participating public high schools and 34th among schools in New Jersey.

In the 2011 "Ranking America's High Schools" issue by The Washington Post, the school was ranked 41st in New Jersey and 1,346th nationwide. In Newsweek's May 22, 2007 issue, ranking the country's top high schools, Montville High School was listed in 964th place, the 28th-highest ranked school in New Jersey.

The school was the 51st-ranked public high school in New Jersey out of 339 schools statewide in New Jersey Monthly magazine's September 2014 cover story on the state's "Top Public High Schools", using a new ranking methodology. The school had been ranked 39th in the state of 328 schools in 2012, after being ranked 47th in 2010 out of 322 schools listed. The magazine ranked the school 54th in 2008 out of 316 schools. The school was ranked 49th in the magazine's September 2006 issue, which included 316 schools across the state.

In 2025, SchoolDigger ranked Montville Township High School 50th out of 429 New Jersey public high schools, with strong proficiency results and a high four-year graduation rate. the U.S. News & World Report 2025 list places the school 62nd in New Jersey and 1,361st nationally.

== Graduate statistics ==
Based on data for the Class of 2017 from the New Jersey School Report Card, the graduation rate was 99%. Average SAT scores were 581 Mathematics, 548 Critical Reading and 554 Writing, for a composite score of 1683, vs. statewide averages of 496/521/497 and a composite of 1514; Of students who took the SAT, 65.1% met the standard of college readiness with a composite score of 1550, vs. a statewide average of 44.6%. There were 19 AP courses offered / exams taken, with 42.1% of students taking at least one exam and 84.5% scoring 3 or above. In more recent years, Montville has maintained a graduation rate above 97%, with a majority of students continuing on to post-secondary education. The school now offers more than 20 Advanced Placement courses, with over 80% of AP exam takers scoring 3 or higher, consistently above state and national averages. Montville students also perform strongly on the ACT and SAT, and each year several qualify as National Merit Scholarship semifinalists or finalists.

== Athletics ==
The Montville High School Mustangs compete in the Northwest Jersey Athletic Conference, an athletic conference comprised of public and private high schools located in Morris, Sussex and Warren counties in Northern New Jersey, that was established following a reorganization of sports leagues in Northern New Jersey by the New Jersey State Interscholastic Athletic Association (NJSIAA). With 904 students in grades 10–12, the school was classified by the NJSIAA for the 2019–20 school year as Group III for most athletic competition purposes, which included schools with an enrollment of 761 to 1,058 students in that grade range. Montville is assigned to the American Division for most sports. Prior to the NJSIAA's realignment that took effect in the fall of 2009, Montville was a member of the Suburban Division of the Northern Hills Conference. The football team competes in the Patriot White division of the North Jersey Super Football Conference, which includes 112 schools competing in 20 divisions, making it the nation's biggest football-only high school sports league. The school was classified by the NJSIAA as Group III North for football for 2024–2026, which included schools with 700 to 884 students.

The 1978 baseball team finished the season at 16–10 after winning the Group II state championship with a 3–1 win against South Brunswick High School in the championship game. The 2007 Mustang baseball team defeated Northern Valley Regional High School at Old Tappan, 9–7, to take the North I Group III section title for the first time since 1989. The team has won the Morris County Tournament three times, tied for the fourth-most in tournament history, winning in 1974, 1980 and 1992.

The girls' field hockey team won the North II Group II state sectional championship in 1975 and 1977, and the North II Group III state sectional title in 1980, 1981, 1983 and 1984. The team won the Group III state championship in 1980 (vs. Ocean Township High School), 1981 (vs. Camden Catholic High School) and 1983 (as co-champion with Hillsborough High School). The 1980 team finished the season with a record of 19-1-3 after winning the Group III title with a 3–2 win against Ocean Township in overtime in the tournament final at Mercer County Park.

The girls' lacrosse team won the overall state championship in 1984, defeating Moorestown Friends School in the tournament final.

The girls tennis team won the Group III state championship in 2013, defeating Princeton High School in the tournament final. The 2013 team beat Moorestown High School 4–1 in the semifinals and moved on to defeat Princeton 4–1 in the finals.

In 2001, the Montville boys' soccer team won the North II, Group II state sectional title with a 2–1 win in the championship game against Pequannock Township High School in sudden death overtime. In 2009, the Montville boys' soccer team tied Madison High School 0–0 in the final of the Morris County tournament. The shared title was the first in the program's history. The Mustangs went on to win their third ever sectional title, beating Northern Highlands Regional High School 2–0 in the final. In 2010, Montville captured the Morris County boys' soccer title outright, winning 1–0 in overtime against Chatham High School. The Mustangs also repeated as sectional champions, defeating Wayne Valley High School 5–1 in the section final for their fourth ever title.

The girls' track team won the Group I indoor relay state championship in 2002.

In 2003, the Montville Mustang football team set school records with nine wins and six shut outs, winning the first round of the state sectionals before losing in the state semi-final game, earning induction into the Montville Township Hall of Fame in 2011.

The ice hockey team won the Haas Cup in 2009 and 2018, and won the Halvorsen Cup in 2015.

The boys' wrestling team won the North I Group III state sectional title in 2009, 2019 and 2020. The team won the Group III state championship in 2020.

The boys' bowling team won the Group III state championship in 2014 and wom the Group II title in 2022.

In 2014, Meg Hishmeh was hired as the head coach of the boys' ice hockey team, becoming the first women in the state to serve as hockey coach of a boys' team.

== Extracurricular activities ==
The school's marching band won the USBands Group III A national championship in 2015 with their program Equilibrium. In 2018, teacher Mary Gormley received the "National Educator of the Year" award from the National Speech and Debate Association for her work as both a coach and educator. The marching band again won the USBands Group II-A national and state championships in 2018 with their program Elements.

Beyond the marching band, Montville Township High School offers a wide range of extracurricular programs, including academic clubs such as DECA, Science Olympiad, Model United Nations, and robotics. The school also supports a performing arts program with choir and annual theater productions, as well as service and leadership organizations such as Key Club, National Honor Society, and student government. The school’s forensics (speech and debate) team is also a notable extracurricular program, competing in regional and national tournaments.

== Administration ==
The school's principal is Kenneth Nadzak. His core administration team includes two assistant principals.

== Notable alumni ==
- Omar Amanat (class of 1990), entrepreneur and convicted fraudster, who was inducted into the MTHS Hall of Fame in 2005
- Lester Archambeau (born 1967), former professional football player
- Olivia Blois Sharpe (born 1987), make-up artist and lead caster member of the Style Network reality series Jerseylicious
- Chris Brauchle (born 1967), former professional soccer player
- Dilly Duka (born 1989), professional soccer player for Columbus Crew SC
- Lauren English, (born 1989), competitive swimmer who set the U.S. record in the 50 meter backstroke and is the only swimmer to win individual NJSIAA titles all four high school years
- Ashley Lauren Fisher (born 1975), actress, model and spinal cord injury activist
- Frank Mattiace (born 1961), former professional football nose tackle and coach
- Kristen McNabb (born 1994), soccer defender who plays for Seattle Reign FC of the National Women's Soccer League
- Dan O'Dowd (born 1959, class of 1976), MLB Network analyst and former Colorado Rockies general manager
- Jim Price (born 1966), former professional football player
- Regan Ryzuk (born 1955), composer and pianist
- Scott Shields (born 1978), political activist.
- Dena Tauriello, drummer for the all-female band Antigone Rising
- Peter Verniero (born 1959, class of 1977), former New Jersey Attorney General and New Jersey Supreme Court justice
- Travis Warech (born 1991), professional basketball player for Ironi Nahariya of the Israeli Premier League
- Pete Yorn (born 1974), singer / songwriter "Strange Condition"
