= Montville Township School District =

School district in Morris County, New Jersey, US

Address
- 86 River Road Montville, Morris County, New Jersey, 07045
- Coordinates: 40.865491°N 74.34821°W

District information
- Grades: PreK-12
- Superintendent: Thomas A. Gorman
- Business administrator: Katine Slunt
- Schools: 7

Students and staff
- Enrollment: 3,469 (as of 2022–23)
- Faculty: 348.5 FTEs
- Student–teacher ratio: 10.0:1

Other information
- District Factor Group: I
- Website: www.montville.net
Ind.	Per pupil	District spending	Rank (*)	K-12 average	%± vs. average
1A	Total Spending	$18,239	45	$18,891	−3.5%
1	Budgetary Cost	14,462	51	14,783	−2.2%
2	Classroom Instruction	9,030	66	8,763	3.0%
6	Support Services	2,433	62	2,392	1.7%
8	Administrative Cost	1,366	35	1,485	−8.0%
10	Operations & Maintenance	1,216	10	1,783	−31.8%
13	Extracurricular Activities	412	100	268	53.7%
16	Median Teacher Salary	61,960	34	64,043
Data from NJDoE 2014 Taxpayers' Guide to Education Spending. *Of K-12 districts with more than 3,500 students. Lowest spending=1; Highest=103

The Montville Township School District is a comprehensive community public school district that serves students in pre-kindergarten through twelfth grade from Montville, in Morris County, in the U.S. state of New Jersey.

As of the 2022–23 school year, the district, comprised of seven schools, had an enrollment of 3,469 students and 348.5 classroom teachers (on an FTE basis), for a student–teacher ratio of 10.0:1.

The district had been classified by the New Jersey Department of Education as being in District Factor Group "I", the second-highest of eight groupings. District Factor Groups organize districts statewide to allow comparison by common socioeconomic characteristics of the local districts. From lowest socioeconomic status to highest, the categories are A, B, CD, DE, FG, GH, I and J.

== Awards and recognition ==
In 2016, Cedar Hill Elementary School was one of ten schools in New Jersey recognized as a National Blue Ribbon School by the United States Department of Education. In 2024, Hillsdale Elementary School was one of 11 statewide that was recognized as a Blue Ribbon School of Excellence.

The district and several of its schools have been recognized by Character.org in its Schools of Character program. In 2016, Cedar Hill Elementary School and Woodmont Elementary School were named New Jersey and National Schools of Character. In 2018, Robert R. Lazar Middle School was named a New Jersey and National School of Character and the Montville School District was named a New Jersey and National District of Character. In 2019, William Mason Elementary School was named a New Jersey State and National School of Character. In 2020, Hilldale Elementary School and Valley View Elementary School were names New Jersey State Schools of Character.

By 2020, all seven of the Montville Township Public Schools have attained Bronze Level certification through the Sustainable Jersey for Schools Program.

For the 1994-95 school year, Robert R. Lazar Middle School was named as a "Star School" by the New Jersey Department of Education, the highest honor that a New Jersey school can achieve.

In 2013, Valley View Elementary School was named as a high performing "Reward School" by the New Jersey Department of Education, one of 57 schools statewide and eight in Morris County to earn this recognition.

== Schools ==
Schools in the district (with 2022–23 enrollment data from the National Center for Education Statistics) are:

Elementary schools

- Cedar Hill Elementary School with 328 students in grades PreK-5
  - Michael Raj, principal
- Hilldale Elementary School with 320 students in grades K-5
  - Jill Cisneros, principal
- William H. Mason Jr. Elementary School with 277 students in grades K-5
  - Dave Melucci, principal
- Valley View Elementary School with 365 students in grades PreK-5
  - Patricia J. Kennedy, principal
- Woodmont Elementary School with 310 students in grades K-5
  - Dominic Esposito, principal

Middle school

- Robert R. Lazar Middle School with 724 students in grades 6-8
  - Michael Pasciuto, principal

High school

- Montville Township High School with 1,112 students in grades 9-12
  - Douglas Sanford, principal

After school

- Montville Extended Day Learning Center is an after-school program available at all the elementary schools in the district.

== Administration ==
Core members of the district's administration are:

- Thomas A. Gorman, superintendent
- Katine Slunt, business administrator and board secretary

== Board of education ==
The district's board of education is comprised of nine members who set policy and oversee the fiscal and educational operation of the district through its administration. As a Type II school district, the board's trustees are elected directly by voters to serve three-year terms of office on a staggered basis, with three seats up for election each year held (since 2012) as part of the November general election. The board appoints a superintendent to oversee the district's day-to-day operations and a business administrator to supervise the business functions of the district. The current Board of Education is David Modrak (President), Joseph Daughtry (Vice President), Karen Cortellino, Christine Fano, Michael Palma, John Petrozzino, Michael Rappaport, Caitlin Smith and Michelle Zuckerman.
