= Van Duyne–Jacobus House =

- U.S. National Register of Historic Places
- New Jersey Register of Historic Places
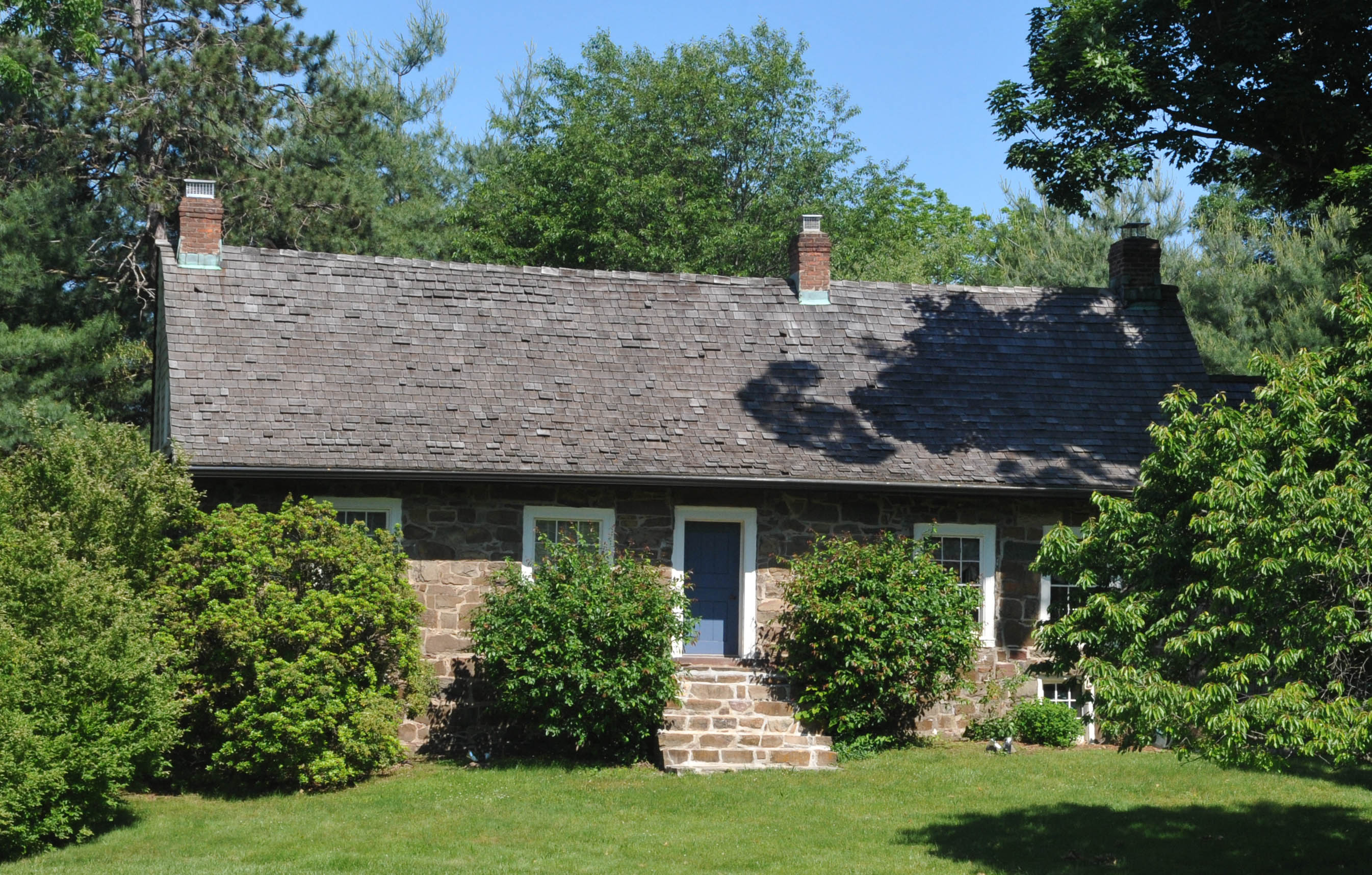

- Location within Morris County, New Jersey Location within New Jersey Location within the United States
- Location: 29 Changebridge Road; Montville, New Jersey
- Coordinates: 40°54′39″N 74°21′50″W
- Area: 16.5 acres (6.7 ha)
- Built: c. 1761–1778
- Architectural style: Colonial, Dutch Colonial
- MPS: Dutch Stone Houses in Montville MPS
- NRHP reference No.: 91001929
- NJRHP No.: 2162

Significant dates
- Added to NRHP: January 17, 1992
- Designated NJRHP: November 25, 1991

The Van Duyne–Jacobus House is a historic stone farmhouse located at 29 Changebridge Road in the township of Montville in Morris County, New Jersey. The oldest section was built c. 1761–1778. It was added to the National Register of Historic Places on January 17, 1992, for its significance in architecture. It was listed as part of the Dutch Stone Houses in Montville Multiple Property Submission (MPS).

== History and description ==
Martin Van Duyne Sr. purchased about 200 acres (81 ha) near Towaco in 1730. His son, Martin Van Duyne Jr., purchase a portion for his own farm in 1761. He built the stone farmhouse sometime after this and before 1778. His son, Richard Van Duyne, inherited the farm in 1811. Later, Timothy Jacobus purchased the property in 1863. The one and one-half story house has a gable roof and features local Dutch Colonial architecture.

== See also ==
- National Register of Historic Places listings in Morris County, New Jersey
- List of the oldest buildings in New Jersey
