= Frank Mattiace =

American football player (born 1961)

No. 75, 97
- Position: Nose tackle

Personal information
- Born: January 20, 1961 (age 65); Paterson, New Jersey, U.S.
- Listed height: 6 ft 1 in (1.85 m)
- Listed weight: 264 lb (120 kg)

Career information
- High school: Montville Township (Montville, New Jersey)
- College: Holy Cross
- NFL draft: 1983: undrafted

Career history

Playing
- Green Bay Packers (1983)*; New Jersey Generals (1984–1985); Detroit Lions (1987)*; Indianapolis Colts (1987)
- * Offseason or practice squad member only

Coaching
- New Jersey Red Dogs (1999–2000) Head coach

Awards and highlights
- All-ECAC (1982)
- Stats at Pro Football Reference

Frank Louis Mattiace (born January 20, 1961) is an American former professional football nose tackle and coach. He played college football at Holy Cross, and professionally for the New Jersey Generals of the United States Football League (USFL) and the Indianapolis Colts of the National Football League (NFL). He was also the head coach of the New Jersey Red Dogs of the Arena Football League (AFL).

== Early life and college ==
Mattiace was born in Paterson, New Jersey and attended Montville Township High School in Montville, New Jersey.

He played college football for the Holy Cross Crusaders. He earned All-ECAC and honorable mention All-American honors his senior year in 1982.

== Professional career ==
After going undrafted in the 1983 NFL draft, Mattiace signed with the Green Bay Packers on July 19, 1983. He was waived by the Packers on August 29, 1983.

Mattiace played for the New Jersey Generals of the United States Football League (USFL) from 1984 to 1985. Mattiace appeared in 17 games, starting two, for the Generals in 1984 and recorded three sacks. He played in 17 games again during the 1985 season, totaling three sacks. Mattiace re-signed with the Generals in June 1986 but the 1986 USFL season was later cancelled.

He was signed by the Detroit Lions of the NFL on March 4, 1987. He was waived by the team on August 26, 1987.

On September 23, 1987, Mattiace signed with the NFL's Indianapolis Colts as a replacement player during the 1987 NFL players strike. He played in three games for the Colts and made one sack before being waived on October 19, 1987.

== Coaching career ==
Mattiace began his coaching career in 1987, coaching at several high schools and also serving a stint as an assistant coach at Montclair State, before joining the New Jersey Red Dogs of the Arena Football League (AFL) as offensive line coach in 1997. He returned to high school coaching in 1998.

In 1999, Mattiace was hired as the head coach and general manager of the New Jersey Red Dogs. The Red Dogs had a 6–8 regular season record in 1999. He was fired in 2000 after beginning the season with a 3–7 record.

He again returned to high school coaching in 2000.

=== Head coaching record ===
| Team | Year | Regular season | | | | Postseason | | | |
| Team | Year | Won | Lost | Win % | Finish | Won | Lost | Win % | Result |
|---|---|---|---|---|---|---|---|---|---|
| New Jersey | 1999 | 6 | 8 | .429 | 2nd in NC Eastern | - | - | - | |
| New Jersey | 2000 | 3 | 7 | .300 | (Fired) | - | - | - | |
| Total | | 9 | 15 | .375 | | - | - | - | |

== Personal life ==
A resident of Montville, New Jersey, Mattiace has spent time as a substance abuse counselor and the executive director of the New Pathway Counseling Service in New Jersey. He has counseled former NFL players who had painkiller addictions.
