= 1999 New Jersey Red Dogs season =

Arena Football League team season

- Head coach: Frank Mattiace
- Home stadium: Continental Airlines Arena

Results
- Record: 6–8
- Division place: 2nd NC Eastern
- Playoffs: Did not qualify

The 1999 New Jersey Red Dogs season was the third season for the franchise. The Red Dogs played their homes games in East Rutherford, New Jersey They finished at 6–8, 2nd in the Eastern Division. They were coached by first year head coach Frank Mattiace.

== Season schedule ==
Week	Date	Opponent	Result	Record
1	February 23	@ Arizona	L 54–62	0–1
2	May 2	Albany	W 52–51	1–1
3	May 7	@ Buffalo	W 41–39	2–1
4	May 17	@ Portland	W 38–24	3–1
5	May 22	Orlando	L 38–51 (OT)	3–2
6	May 28	Milwaukee	L 40–53	3–3
7	Bye			
8	June 12	@ Albany	L 34–38	3–4
9	June 18	New England	W 44–43	4–4
10	June 25	Buffalo	W 34–20	5–4
11	July 2	@ Houston	L 38–44	5–5
12	July 10	Iowa	L 23–56	5–6
13	July 17	@ Tampa Bay	L 31–55	5–7
14	July 26	@ New England	W 65–64 (OT)	6–7
15	July 30	Nashville	L 51–66	6–8

== Personnel ==
=== Staff ===
1999 New Jersey Red Dogs staff
Head coaches: Head coach & General Manager – Frank Mattiace; coaches: Offensive coordinator/Assistant Head Coach – Frank Haege; Receivers – Pete Costanza; Offensive line & Special Teams – Joe Moss; Fullback/Linebacker & Special Teams – Jeff Hoffman; Secondary – Amod Field

=== Roster ===
1999 New Jersey Red Dogs roster
Quarterbacks: 14 Rickey Foggie; 13 Charles Puleri; FB/LB: 40 Kevin Clemens; -- Pat McNerney; 44 Ron Perry; 32 Jermaine Younger; WR/DB: 6 Alvin Ashley; 9 Marvin Bagley; 7 Henry Baker; 24 Keita Crespina; 25 Kevin Guy; 2 Pierre Hixon; 5 Willie Latta; 21 Chad Lindsey; 19 Manny Pina; 1 Dimitrious Stanley	OL/DL: 93 Wilky Bazile; 98 Jerome Brown; 50 Harvie Herrington; -- Ralph Jarvis; -- Pete Ohnegian; 75 John Robinson; 33 Alex Rodriguez; 72 Matt Steeple; 77 Robert Stewart; 90 Jason Walters; -- Charles Woolridge	Specialists: 4 Larry Thompson; 41 Latish Kinsler; 3 Adrian Lunsford; Kickers: 10 Steve Videtich; Roster updated June 21, 2025
