= Simon Van Duyne House =

- U.S. National Register of Historic Places
- New Jersey Register of Historic Places
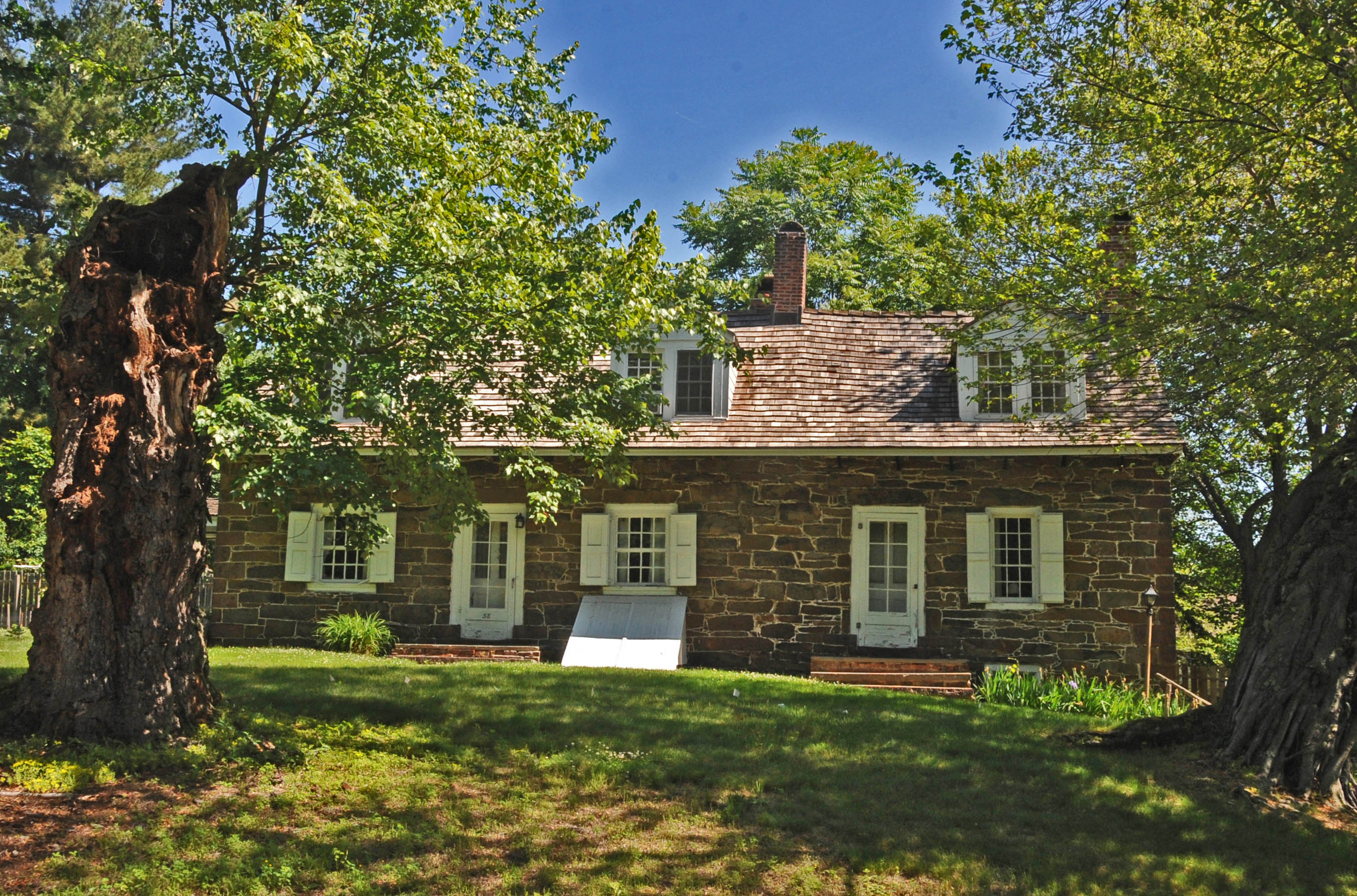

- Location within Morris County, New Jersey Location within New Jersey Location within the United States
- Location: 58 Maple Avenue; Pine Brook, New Jersey
- Coordinates: 40°51′55″N 74°20′22″W
- Built: 1750
- Architectural style: Colonial, Dutch Colonial
- MPS: Dutch Stone Houses in Montville MPS
- NRHP reference No.: 91001932
- NJRHP No.: 2165

Significant dates
- Added to NRHP: January 17, 1992
- Designated NJRHP: November 25, 1991

The Simon Van Duyne House is a historic house located at 58 Maple Avenue in the Pine Brook section of the township of Montville in Morris County, New Jersey. The oldest section was built c. 1750. It was documented by the Historic American Buildings Survey in 1936. The house was later added to the National Register of Historic Places on January 17, 1992, for its significance in architecture. The house was also listed as part of the Dutch Stone Houses in Montville, New Jersey Multiple Property Submission (MPS).

== History and description ==
In 1787, James Van Duyne purchased 205 acres (83 ha) from the estate of Robert Sandford Sr. and in 1789, gave it to his son Simon Van Duyne. According to the nomination form, the oldest section of the house may have been built by Sandford c. 1750.

The house is constructed using sandstone in the vernacular architectural style of the Dutch stone houses in the area.

== See also ==
- National Register of Historic Places listings in Morris County, New Jersey
- List of the oldest buildings in New Jersey
