= Trinity Christian School (New Jersey) =

Christian school in Morris County, New Jersey, United States

Location
- 160 Changebridge Road; Montville, Morris County, New Jersey 07045; United States
- 40.8915°N 74.3652°W

Information
- Type: Private school
- Motto: Coram Deo
- Established: 1986
- NCES School ID: A9104480
- Head of school: Jerry Nunes
- Faculty: 18.1 FTEs
- Grades: K-12
- Enrollment: 180 (as of 2023–24)
- Student to teacher ratio: 9.9:1
- Colors: White and Blue
- Accreditation: Middle States Association of Colleges and Schools Commission on Elementary and Secondary Schools
- Tuition: $13,830 (grades 9–12 for 2026–27)
- Website: www.tcsnj.org

Trinity Christian School (TCS) is a private, classical Christian school located in Montville, in Morris County, in the U.S. state of New Jersey. Trinity Christian School includes elementary (K-6) and secondary (7-12) grades, offering education that is "biblically-based, academically excellent, and classical".

The school has been accredited by the Middle States Association of Colleges and Schools Commission on Elementary and Secondary Schools since 2015. It is a member of Association of Christian Schools International, Association of Classical and Christian Schools, New Jersey Christian School Association and the Metro Christian Athletic Association.

As of the 2023–24 school year, the school had an enrollment of 180 students and 18.1 classroom teachers (on an FTE basis), for a student–teacher ratio of 9.9:1. The school's student body was 44.4% (80) White, 23.9% (43) Asian, 22.2% (40) Hispanic, 8.9% (16) Black and 0.6% (1) two or more races.
