= Chris Brauchle =

American soccer player

Personal information
- Full name: Chris Brauchle
- Date of birth: 24 May 1967 (age 59)
- Place of birth: Montville, New Jersey, United States
- Height: 5 ft 10 in (1.78 m)
- Position: Midfielder

College career
Years	Team	Apps	(Gls)
1986–1989	Rutgers Scarlet Knights		

Senior career*
Years	Team	Apps	(Gls)
1990–1991	FC Bayern Munich II	20	(3)
1991–1992	Tampa Bay Rowdies	16	(2)
1993–1994	Jahn Regensburg	30	(2)
1995	Jersey Dragons		
1996–1998	Central Jersey Riptide		(1)
1996	→ MetroStars (loan)	5	(0)
1999	New Jersey Stallions		
- * Club domestic league appearances and goals

Chris Brauchle (born May 24, 1967) is an American retired professional soccer player and current youth soccer coach.

Brauchle grew up in Montville, New Jersey, and graduated from Montville Township High School in the class of 1985.

== Playing career ==
In 1989, Brauchle scored the game-winning goal against the University of Vermont Catamounts to send Rutgers Scarlet Knights to the NCAA final four for the first time since 1967. The goal was scored in the 18th minute of stoppage time when Brauchle met a cross from Dave Muller and pushed it past Jim St. Andre.

Following his college career, Brauchle joined Bayern Munich Amateure in the German Oberliga and remained at the club for two seasons. He then returned to the United States, joining the Tampa Bay Rowdies in the American Professional Soccer League. In 1993, he returned to Germany, signing with Jahn Regensburg, and made 30 league appearances scoring two goals. In 1995, he returned to New Jersey signing with the Jersey Dragons. In the following season, he joined the newly created Central Jersey Riptide in the USISL Pro League. He helped the club to a first-place finish in the Northeast division. He remained at the club for three seasons.

During the 1996 season, Brauchle was loaned to MetroStars in Major League Soccer and made five league appearances with the top flight club. He made his debut for the club on June 26, 1996, in a 2–0 victory over Kansas City Wizards. He ended his professional career in 1999 with USL club New Jersey Stallions.

== Coaching career ==
Brauchle has coached youth soccer for the Parsippany Soccer Club since 2010. He was named director of coaching for the club in early 2014.

== Statistics ==
Club performance			League		Cup		League Cup		Continental		Total	
Season	Club	League	Apps	Goals	Apps	Goals	Apps	Goals	Apps	Goals	Apps	Goals
USA			League		Open Cup		League Cup		North America		Total	
1996	MetroStars (loan)	MLS	5	0	0	0	0	0	0	0	5	0
Career total			5	0	0	0	0	0	0	0	5	0
