= Pine Brook, Morris County, New Jersey =

Populated place in Morris County, New Jersey, US

Pine Brook, New Jersey
- Census-designated place
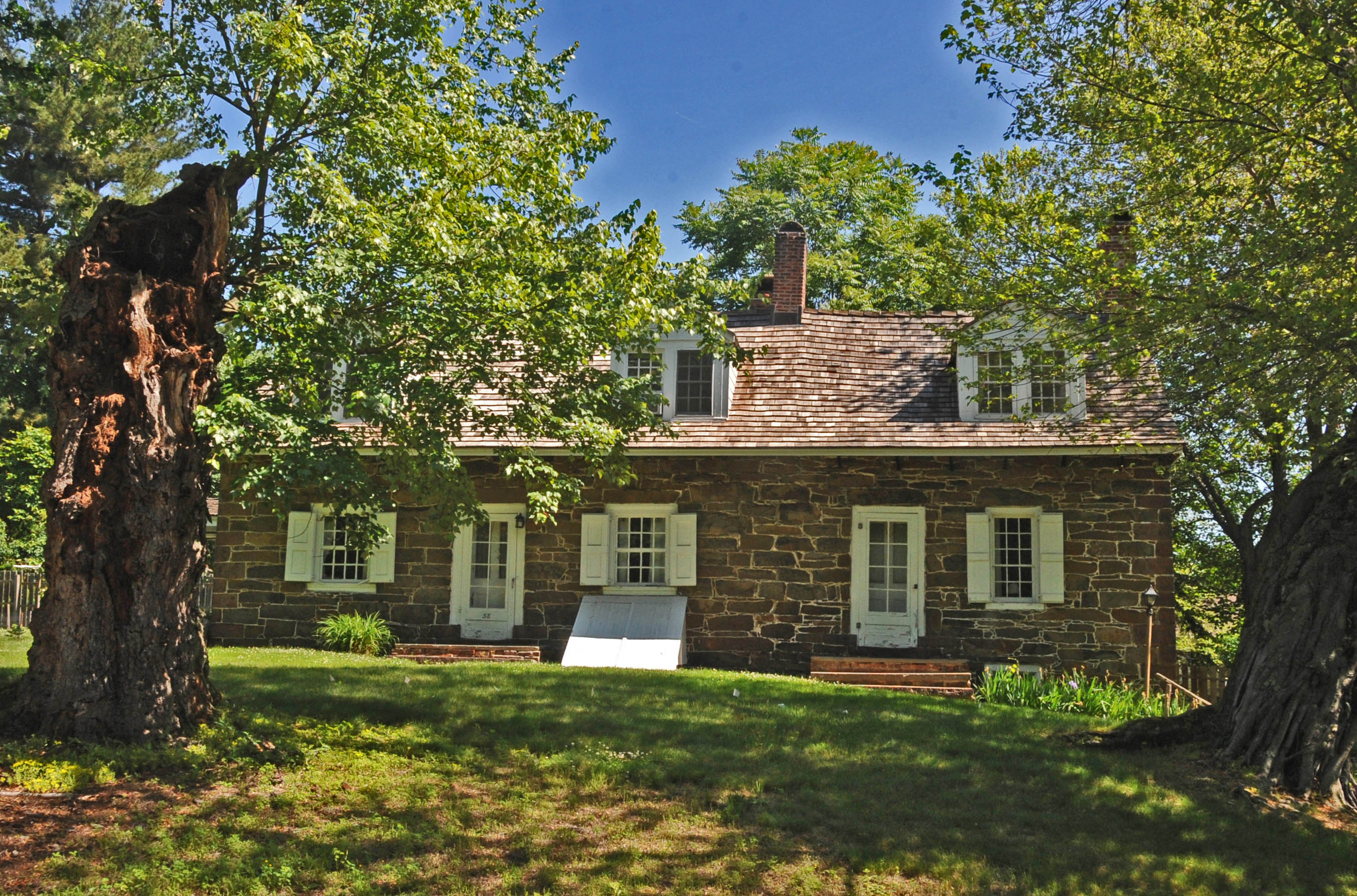
- Simon Van Duyne House, built c. 1750

- Location in Morris County Location in New Jersey Location in the United States
- Coordinates: 40°51′37″N 74°20′26″W
- Country: United States
- State: New Jersey
- County: Morris
- Township: Montville

Area
  - Total: 3.249 sq mi (8.41 km^{2})
  - Land: 3.164 sq mi (8.19 km^{2})
  - Water: 0.085 sq mi (0.22 km^{2})
- Elevation: 200 ft (60 m)

Population (2020 census)
  - Total: 5,675
  - Density: 1,793.6/sq mi (692.5/km^{2})
- ZIP Code: 07058
- FIPS code: 34-58650
- GNIS feature ID: 0879292

Pine Brook, sometimes spelled Pinebrook, is a census-designated place (CDP) and unincorporated community in Montville Township, Morris County, New Jersey, United States. As of the 2020 United States census, the CDP had a population of 5,675.

The area is served by U.S. Postal Service ZIP Code 07058.

== History ==
=== Native American settlement ===
Over 10,000 years ago, the area now known as Pine Brook was settled by Lenape tribes as part of the Lenapehoking. The Lenape tribes maintained peace, and no significant battles were recorded in the area today known as Montville Township.

=== Dutch and English settlement ===
In the 1710s, Dutch farmers from New Amsterdam settled in Pine Brook. They produced dairy products as well as fruits and vegetables, and for many years there existed a large business in cider making and distilling of cider brandy in nearby cider mills.

In 1760, Pine Brook was the site of the first schoolhouse in Montville Township. It was built out of logs and was located on the road leading to Boonton, according to A History of Morris County, which could refer to multiple northwest-facing roads including Changebridge Road.

With its close proximity to Morristown during the American Revolutionary War, both British and American forces traveled through the area.

=== American history ===
Additional Pine Brook schools were constructed in 1785, 1816, and 1852.

In 1809, the Parsippany and Roadway Turnpike Company constructed the road that begins at Pine Brook that "ran up through the Boudinot Meadows, Troy, Parsippany, Denville, Rockaway, across the mountain to Mount Pleasant, there joining the Union Turnpike." This possibly refers to the western terminus of today's Bloomfield Avenue where it becomes U.S. Route 46, connecting the port city of Newark with the farms, foundries, and mines of western New Jersey.

On April 11, 1867, the New Jersey Legislature formally united and chartered the three sections of White Hall, Montville, and Pine Brook into present day Montville Township from territory set off from Pequannock Township.

Pine Brook, being nearly surrounded by the Rockaway and Passaic rivers, consists of what is called the Pine Brook flats, and is a level tract with soil of sandy loam free from stone, which, when properly cultivated, is productive. This part of the township of Montville is about 13 miles (21 km) from Newark, with which it is connected by a good road, which for three-quarters of the distance consists of a Telford pavement. The soil consists mainly of loam on clay bottom, and is generally productive in grass, grain, vegetables and fruit. The farmers engaged largely in the production of milk to supply the Newark market, and considerable quantities of butter, eggs, poultry, pork, beef, hay and straw were produced for market. For some years, considerable attention was given to planting choice fruit trees, and some reaped the benefits in apples and pears, which generally yielded a good return. The land in this township is chiefly rolling.

— John Kanouse (part of the Kanouse family, originally Knauss; a prominent family of Rockaway township), Hon., 1881

Way Station - "From the description of property in old deeds, it appears that between 1800 and 1810 an attempt was made to name the cluster of three or four houses at Pine Brook, where George D. Mead keeps a store, "Union Village", but as a village failed to grow up, the name was dropped and has been forgotten. At this point, a tavern was kept over eighty years and for many years it did a legitimate and profitable business in the accommodations of "Sussex Teams", as they were called, which in large numbers used to pass this way toward Newark with loads of flour, feed, grain, butter, pork, and other produce from Sussex, Warren, and the upper parts of Morris county." (Hon. John Kanouse - 1881)

The Pine Brook Speedway, which operated from July 1962 until October 1989, was designed for midget car racing and became one of the earliest sites for microstock racing. Mario Andretti raced at the track and had some of his earliest success as a race car driver at the speedway.

== Geography ==
Pine Brook is located in eastern Morris County, at the southern end of Montville Township. The center of the community sits in the Pine Brook Flats, a plain created by the surrounding Rockaway River and Passaic River. The northern part of the CDP lies on a ridge that continues north as Towakhow Mountain, with elevations in the CDP reaching 380 feet (120 m) above sea level. It is bounded to the north by the rest of Montville Township, to the east by the Passaic River across from Fairfield Township (Old Horse Neck) in Essex County, to the south by the Rockaway River across from East Hanover Township, and to the west by the Rockaway River across from Parsippany and Lake Hiawatha.

U.S. Route 46 passes through the center of Pine Brook, leading west 4 miles (6.4 km) to the center of Parsippany and east 11 miles (18 km) to Clifton. Interstate 80 passes through the community as well, with access from Exit 48, a partial interchange. I-80 leads east 20 miles (32 km) to its terminus at Interstate 95 in Teaneck, and west 46 miles (74 km) to the Delaware Water Gap.

According to the U.S. Census Bureau, the Pine Brook CDP has a total area of 3.25 square miles (8.42 km^{2}), of which 3.16 square miles (8.18 km^{2}) are land and 0.09 square miles (0.23 km^{2}), or 2.62%, are water.

== Demographics ==
Historical population
| Census | Pop. | Note | %± |
|---|---|---|---|
| 2010 | 5,372 | | — |
| 2020 | 5,675 | | 5.6% |
Population sources: 2010 2020

Pine Brook was first listed as a census designated place in the 2020 U.S. census.

Pine Brook CDP, New Jersey – Racial and ethnic composition Note: the US Census treats Hispanic/Latino as an ethnic category. This table excludes Latinos from the racial categories and assigns them to a separate category. Hispanics/Latinos may be of any race.
| Race / Ethnicity (NH = Non-Hispanic) | Pop 2020 | 2020 |
|---|---|---|
| White alone (NH) | 3,280 | 57.80% |
| Black or African American alone (NH) | 172 | 3.03% |
| Native American or Alaska Native alone (NH) | 1 | 0.02% |
| Asian alone (NH) | 1,547 | 27.26% |
| Native Hawaiian or Pacific Islander alone (NH) | 3 | 0.05% |
| Other race alone (NH) | 23 | 0.41% |
| Mixed race or Multiracial (NH) | 163 | 2.87% |
| Hispanic or Latino (any race) | 486 | 8.56% |
| Total | 5,675 | 100.00% |

As of the 2010 United States census, the population for ZIP Code Tabulation Area 07058 was 5,372.

== Notable residents ==
People who were born in, residents of, or otherwise closely associated with Pine Brook include:

- Alan Sepinwall (born 1973), television reviewer and writer
- Travis Warech (born 1991), basketball player for Hapoel Tel Aviv B.C. of the Israeli Premier League
