= Bob Price (Canadian football) =

Biographical details
- Born: July 24, 1955 (age 71); New York City, New York, U.S.

Coaching career (HC unless noted)
- 1979–80: Idaho State (graduate assistant)
- 1981–82: Eastern Utah (defensive coordinator)
- 1983: Eastern Utah
- 1984–85: University of Nevada (linebackers/special teams)
- 1986–89: UNLV (DC/secondary/special teams)
- 1990: University of California (secondary)
- 1991: Ottawa (secondary)
- 1992–93: Saskatchewan (DC/secondary)
- 1994–95: Baltimore (DC/linebackers/defensive backs)
- 1996: Montreal
- 1997–99: University of Virginia (running backs)
- 2000–04: University of Virginia (defensive backs)
- 2005–2009: University of Virginia (tight ends/recruiting coordinator)

Head coaching record
- Overall: 12–6 (Canadian Football League)

Bob Price (born July 24, 1955) is a former tight end coach and recruiting coordinator for the Virginia Cavaliers. He also was head coach of the Montreal Alouettes during the team's first season in 1996. He is the brother of Jim Price a tight end for the St. Louis Rams and the Dallas Cowboys.

Born in New York City, Price grew up in Dumont, New Jersey. He began coaching college football as a graduate assistant coach at Idaho State University from 1979–80. One of his fellow GAs was current Cincinnati Bengals head coach Marvin Lewis. He spent the next two seasons as the defensive coordinator at Eastern Utah. In 1983 he was the team's head coach. From 1984–1985 he was the linebackers and special teams coach at Nevada. From 1986–89 he was the defensive coordinator, secondary coach and special teams coach at University of Nevada, Las Vegas. He coached the 1990 season with the California Golden Bears as the team's assistant secondary coach.

Price spent the next six seasons in the Canadian Football League. In 1991 he was the secondary coach of the Ottawa Rough Riders. From 1992–93 Price was the defensive coordinator and secondary coach with the Saskatchewan Roughriders. In 1994 he was hired as the defensive coordinator of the expansion Baltimore Stallions. He also coached the team's linebackers and defensive backs. Baltimore advanced to the Grey Cup both seasons and won it in 1995. When the team moved to Montreal in 1996, Price was hired as the first head coach of the resurrected Montreal Alouettes. Price guided the Alouettes to a 12–6 record, losing to the 15–3 Toronto Argonauts in the Eastern Division Finals.

From 1997–2009 Price was a member of the University of Virginia's coaching staff, serving under head coaches George Welsh and Al Groh. He served as running backs coach from 1997–1999 before being moved to defensive backs coach 2000. In 2005, Price moved to the position of Tight End Coach and Recruiting Coordinator. At UVA, Price coached Thomas Jones and Almondo Curry. The Cavaliers went to bowl games seven times during Price's tenure, winning three.

== CFL coaching record ==
Team	Year	Regular season					Postseason		
Team	Year	Won	Lost	Ties	Win %	Finish	Won	Lost	Result
MTL	1996	12	6	0	.666	2nd in East Division	1	1	Lost in Division Final
