= Microstock (racing) =

Form of kart racing

Microstock is a form of full roll cage go cart or kart racing that originated in New Jersey invented by Bill and Bob Wagner.

They are powered by small 4-cycle engines (200 cc), generally starting out as 5 hp Briggs & Stratton engines originally referred to as "lawnmower" engines, since that is where the first engines were taken from. After being modified for racing, the engines can produce anywhere from 7 to 30+ hp, depending on the racing class. Microstocks were originally designed to hit speeds between 45-65 mph; however, modified racing has pushed them over 100 mph in some cases.

They generally race on asphalt oval tracks, but have also raced on street courses and dirt tracks as well. They are a rigid chassis design using no suspension. Microstock is considered one of the most inexpensive forms of kart racing.

== History ==
The first microstock karts were built by Bob and Bill Wagner in the late 1970s, and were raced around a small dirt track in their backyard.

== Design ==
Microstocks are small, single seat karts designed for oval track racing. They were originally separated into two classes: Sportsman and Modifieds. Both classes shared the majority of physical kart design, with distinctions primarily in engine modification.

=== Sportsman ===
The Sportsman class, the larger of the two classes, was an engine class that used very few and minor modifications to the stock 5 hp engine. This generally consisted of replacing the stock air intake and filter with a more race-ready one, as well as replacing the stock muffler system with a straight pipe exhaust. During the 1980s, Sportsman engines were producing around 7-8 hp.

The Sportsman class was considered the most inexpensive class to join, which attracted the most interest to new members.

=== Modifieds ===
The Modified class allowed much more work to be done to the engines, including changing piston bore and stroke, valve timing, etc. During the 1980s, a modified engine might have been able to produce 17-18 hp.

== The Golden Years (1981 - 1989) ==
The "golden years" of microstock racing were through the 1980s, when they raced at their home track of Pine Brook Speedway in Pine Brook, NJ. The location of the track in north-central NJ was optimum to attract drivers from all over NJ, PA, and NY. It was not uncommon for car counts to reach over 60 microstocks at the peak of their popularity (in contrast, a typical NASCAR race has around 40 cars).

== AMSRA ==
During the 1980s, all official microstock racing was governed by the American Microstock Racing Association. Cars had to adhere to AMSRA rules in order to participate in AMSRA sanctioned races. During the early 1980s, kart racing was nearly unheard of in other parts of the country. It is possible that AMSRA was one of the first few kart sanctioning bodies in the United States along with the WKA. After the loss of their home track of Pine Brook Speedway (see below), microstock racing began a slow but steady decline. After a few years, AMSRA did not have enough membership to maintain control of the sport, and the club began to fraction into smaller subsets of racing (Modified Outlaw Microstocks, World Formula, etc.). AMSRA has been considered defunct since the late 1990s.

== Microstock Racing League ==
The MRL was formed as a replacement to AMSRA. MSRS is the current racing series microctocks in which microstocks run.

=== Tracks ===
Microstocks are generally built to race counter-clockwise on asphalt or paved oval tracks, however they can use modified tires and chassis adjustments to race "drift style" on dirt or clay surfaces. They were/are featured at many local tri-state speedways such as Pinebrook, Flemington, Orange County, Orville, Shellhammers, Snydersville, Wall Stadium, Poughkeepsie, Bethel, Mahoning Valley, and the legendary Pocono Raceway.

=== Wagner Raceway ===
Built in the backyard of Bob and Bill Wagner's house, Microstocks were born and raised on this 1/12 mile dirt track. It is unknown if the track is still there because their address is unknown.

=== Pine Brook Speedway ===
Pine Brook Speedway was a small 1/10 paved oval track located on US Route 46 in Pine Brook, Morris County, New Jersey. Built in 1962 for TQ Midget racing, the track saw nearly three decades of racing and was known as “Home of Champions Speedway” after Mario Andretti raced there before moving up to Indycar. Pine Brook Speedway ran strong before being closed by the property owner at the end of the 1989 racing season (October). A Home Depot now sits on the site.

=== Flemington Speedway ===
Flemington Speedway was known as the “World’s Fastest 5/8 Mile”. Located in Flemington, NJ, it was the oldest weekly running racetrack (1915) in the state before lack of attendance and pressure from the town eventually led to its permanent closure at the end of the 2000 racing season. Microstocks ran special events from the early 1980s to late 1990s. The fastest microstock recorded was at tagged at 94mph at Flemington Speedway. Flemington Speedway is now home to a shopping center.

=== Wall Stadium Speedway ===
Wall Stadium is a famous 1/5 mi banked oval racetrack near the Jersey Shore in Wall Towhship, NJ. It also has a flat oval track below the banked track, and that is where the microstocks run. Currently two classes of microstocks run the Wall Sunday Series during the summer: Modified Outlaw Microstocks (MOM) and the World Formula microstocks. MOM microstocks use modified motors, while the World Formula microstocks use a sealed Briggs & Stratton World Formula racing motor.

== Microstock Racing Today ==
With the fractioning of the larger microstock collective, several smaller subsets have emerged. The most popular ones are the Modified Outlaw Microstocks (MOM), which is primarily made up of cars from the previous Modified class; the World Formula class, which uses a sealed Briggs & Stratton World Formula kart engine; and the Microstock Racing Series (MSRS), it is the sportsman class of the Microstocks using the sealed Briggs & Stratton Local Option 206; The Microstocks still run in New York, New Jersey, and in Pennsylvania.
