= Scott Shields (activist) =

American blogger (born 1978)

- Born: 1978 (age 47–48); Englewood, New Jersey, U.S.
- Education: Montville Township High School
- Occupations: Blogger; political activist

Scott Shields (born 1978) is an American blogger and Democratic Party political activist. Born in Englewood, New Jersey in 1978, he grew up in Morris County, NJ and graduated from Montville Township High School. He rose to prominence in 2005 as a front-page writer for MyDD covering, among other topics, health care politics, labor rights, and the 2005 New Jersey Governor's race.

In 2006, Shields was employed with the campaign of US Senator Bob Menendez in New Jersey. During the campaign, his work was profiled in The Philadelphia Inquirer, The Record of Bergen County, and The New Yorker. He was named one of the years' "Top Political Operatives" by the website PoliticsNJ.com.

His writing can also be seen on MyDD, Daily Kos, BlueJersey, and other prominent blogs.
