= Lester Archambeau =

American football player (born 1967)

No. 74, 92
- Position: Defensive end

Personal information
- Born: June 27, 1967 (age 59); Montville, New Jersey, U.S.
- Listed height: 6 ft 5 in (1.96 m)
- Listed weight: 275 lb (125 kg)

Career information
- High school: Montville (NJ)
- College: Stanford
- NFL draft: 1990: 7th round, 186th overall pick

Career history
- Green Bay Packers (1990–1992); Atlanta Falcons (1993–1999); Denver Broncos (2000)

Awards and highlights
- 2× Second-team All-Pac-10 (1987, 1988)

Career NFL statistics
- Tackles: 340
- Sacks: 36.5
- Forced fumbles: 11
- Fumbles recoveries: 6
- Interceptions: 1
- Passes defended: 2
- Stats at Pro Football Reference

Lester Milward Archambeau III (born June 27, 1967) is an American former professional football player who was a defensive end in the National Football League (NFL). He played college football at Stanford University, and was selected by the Green Bay Packers in the seventh round of the 1990 NFL draft with the 186th overall pick. He grew up in Montville, New Jersey and played high school football at Montville Township High School.
