= Towaco, New Jersey =

Populated place in Morris County, New Jersey, US

- Census-designated place
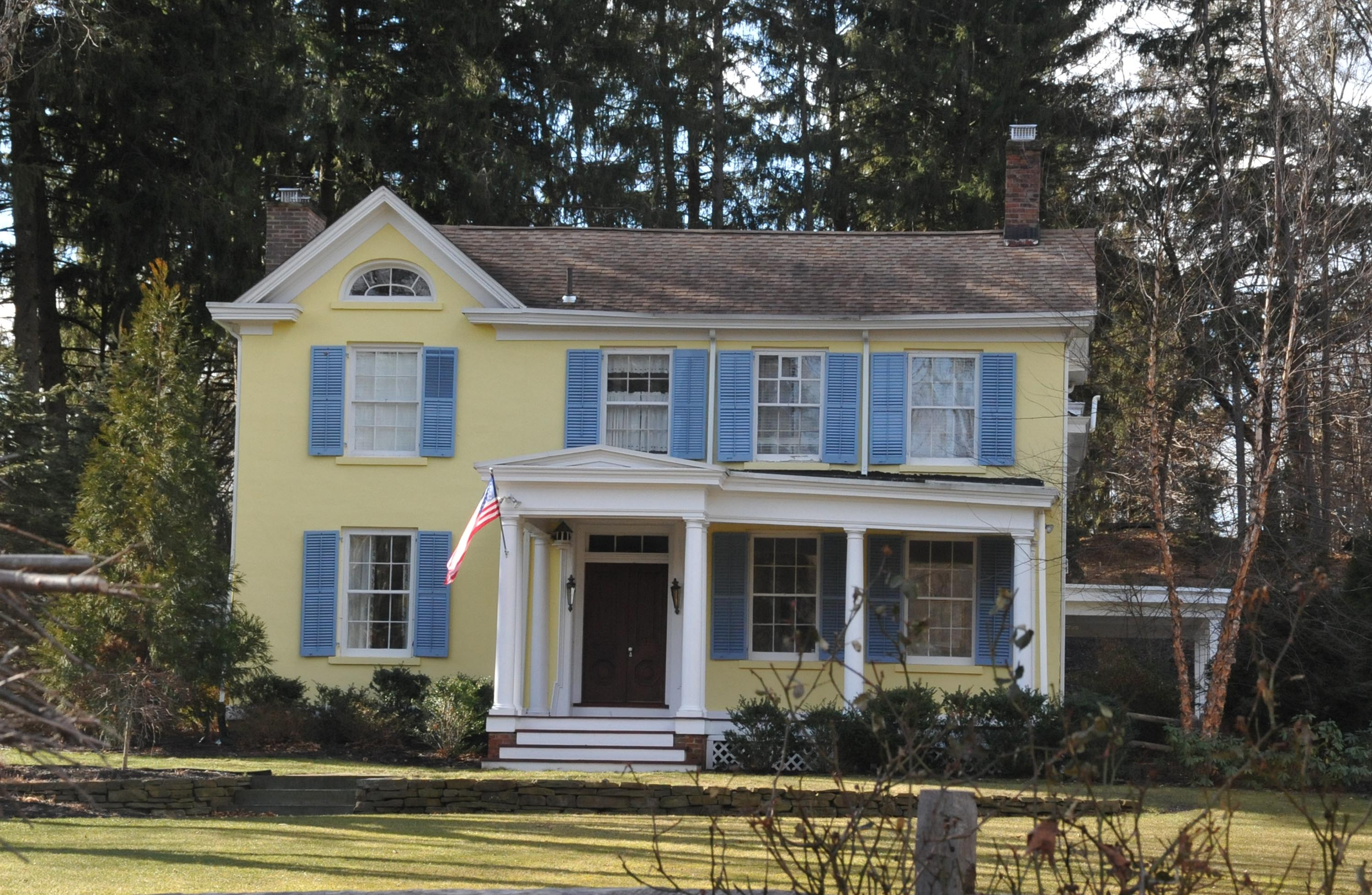
- James Van Duyne Farmhouse

- Location in Morris County Location in New Jersey Location in the United States
- Coordinates: 40°55′19″N 74°20′44″W
- Country: United States
- State: New Jersey
- County: Morris
- Township: Montville

Area
  - Total: 6.06 sq mi (15.70 km^{2})
  - Land: 6.00 sq mi (15.53 km^{2})
  - Water: 0.062 sq mi (0.16 km^{2})
- Elevation: 223 ft (68 m)

Population (2020)
  - Total: 5,624
  - Density: 937.8/sq mi (362.08/km^{2})
- ZIP Code: 07082
- FIPS code: 34-73170
- GNIS feature ID: 0881217

Towaco /təˈwɑː.koʊ/ is an unincorporated community and census-designated place (CDP) in the township of Montville, Morris County, New Jersey, United States. As of the 2020 census, it had a population of 5,624.

The area is served as United States Postal Service ZIP Code 07082. Its name reflects the Native American history in the area, which identified the locale as TaWagh, meaning "hill", a reference to the terrain of Towaco.

The Towaco station offers NJ Transit rail service along the Montclair-Boonton Line. It essentially replaced the abandoned Montville station. The train station has been renovated.

== Geography ==
Towaco is in eastern Morris County and occupies the northeastern part of Montville Township. It is bordered to the north by the borough of Kinnelon and to the east by the borough of Lincoln Park. The Passaic River forms the southeast border of the community, across which is Fairfield Township in Essex County. U.S. Route 202 passes through the center of Towaco, leading east into Lincoln Park and west 4 miles (6 km) to Boonton. Interstate 287 passes through the west side of the community, with the closest access being Exit 47 (US 202) just outside the community to the west.

According to the U.S. Census Bureau, the Towaco CDP has a total area of 6.06 square miles (15.70 km^{2}), of which 6.00 square miles (15.54 km^{2}) are land and 0.06 square miles (0.16 km^{2}), or 1.06%, are water. The community is within the watershed of the Passaic River.

== Demographics ==
Historical population
Census	Pop.	Note	%±
2020	5,624		—
U.S. Decennial Census

Towaco first appeared as a census designated place in the 2020 U.S. census.

=== 2020 census ===
As of the 2020 census, Towaco had a population of 5,624. The median age was 44.3 years. 21.9% of residents were under the age of 18 and 16.7% of residents were 65 years of age or older. For every 100 females there were 94.1 males, and for every 100 females age 18 and over there were 90.9 males age 18 and over.

95.3% of residents lived in urban areas, while 4.7% lived in rural areas.

There were 1,852 households in Towaco, of which 36.3% had children under the age of 18 living in them. Of all households, 70.6% were married-couple households, 8.9% were households with a male householder and no spouse or partner present, and 17.0% were households with a female householder and no spouse or partner present. About 14.1% of all households were made up of individuals and 7.9% had someone living alone who was 65 years of age or older.

There were 1,932 housing units, of which 4.1% were vacant. The homeowner vacancy rate was 1.4% and the rental vacancy rate was 4.3%.

Racial composition as of the 2020 census
Race	Number	Percent
White	4,201	74.7%
Black or African American	63	1.1%
American Indian and Alaska Native	6	0.1%
Asian	822	14.6%
Native Hawaiian and Other Pacific Islander	0	0.0%
Some other race	125	2.2%
Two or more races	407	7.2%
Hispanic or Latino (of any race)	471	8.4%

=== 2010 census ===
As of the 2010 United States census, the population for the Towaco ZIP Code Tabulation Area of 07082 was 5,384.

== Economy ==
Towaco is a location of Bäumer of America, Inc., a manufacturer of machines and plants for the foam industry.

Sea Breeze, maker of Bosco Chocolate Syrup and beverage concentrates for the food service trade, is located in Towaco.

== Notable people ==
People who were born in, residents of, or otherwise closely associated with Towaco include:

- Ulric Ellerhusen (1879–1957), sculptor best known for his works of architectural sculpture
- Teresa and Joe Giudice, reality TV personalities of Bravo TV's Real Housewives of New Jersey
- Joseph McKenna (born 1995), American freestyle and graduated folkstyle wrestler
- James P. Vreeland (1910–2001), politician who served four terms in the New Jersey Senate after a term in the New Jersey General Assembly
