= Montville, New Jersey =

Township in Morris County, New Jersey, US

- Township
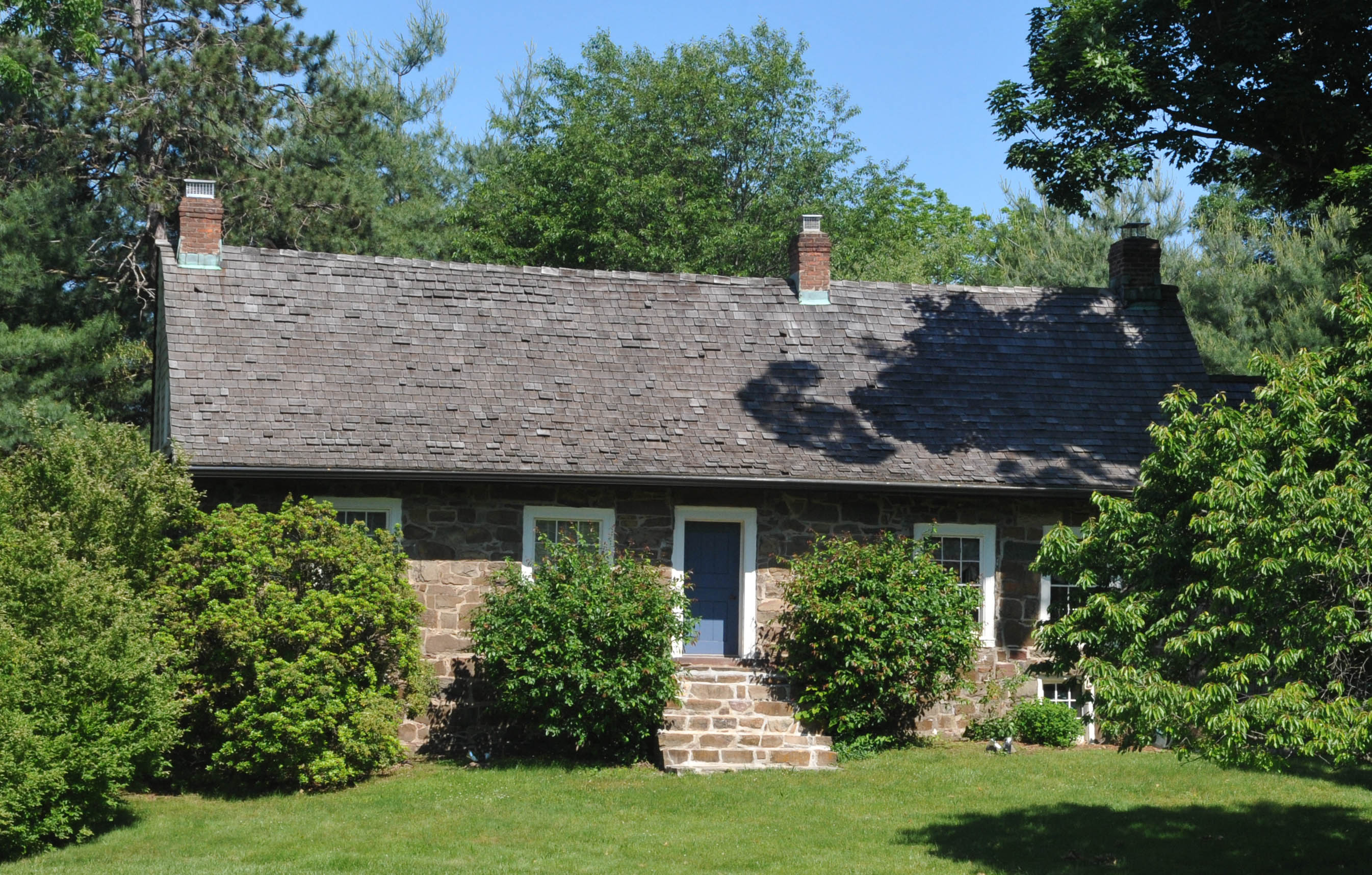
- Van Duyne–Jacobus House

- Seal
- Interactive map of Montville, New Jersey
- Location in Morris County Location in New Jersey Location in the United States
- Coordinates: 40.913225°N 74.354864°W
- Country: United States
- State: New Jersey
- County: Morris
- Incorporated: April 11, 1867
- Named for: Mandeville Inn or terrain

Government
  - Type: Special charter
  - Body: Township Committee
  - Mayor: Matthew S. Kayne (R, term ends December 31, 2023)
  - Administrator: June E. Hercek
  - Municipal clerk: Stacy Sullivan-Gruca

Area
  - Total: 19.12 sq mi (49.51 km^{2})
  - Land: 18.63 sq mi (48.24 km^{2})
  - Water: 0.49 sq mi (1.27 km^{2}) 2.57%
  - Rank: 147th of 565 in state 11th of 39 in county
- Elevation: 279 ft (85 m)

Population (2020)
  - Total: 22,450
  - Estimate (2024): 24,456
  - Rank: 123rd of 565 in state 7th of 39 in county
  - Density: 1,205.2/sq mi (465.3/km^{2})
  - Rank: 361st of 565 in state 26th of 39 in county
- Time zone: UTC−05:00 (Eastern (EST))
  - Summer (DST): UTC−04:00 (Eastern (EDT))
- ZIP Code: 07045 – Montville; 07058 – Pine Brook; 07082 – Towaco
- Area code: 973
- FIPS code: 3402747670
- GNIS feature ID: 0882207
- Website: www.montvillenj.org

Montville is a township in Morris County, in the U.S. state of New Jersey. As of the 2020 United States census, the township's population was 22,450, an increase of 922 (+4.3%) from the 2010 census count of 21,528, which in turn reflected an increase of 689 (+3.3%) from the 20,839 counted in the 2000 census.

Montville was incorporated as a township by an act of the New Jersey Legislature on April 11, 1867, from portions of Pequannock Township. It includes the sections of Montville, Pine Brook and Towaco. NJ Transit rail service is available at the Towaco station along the Montclair-Boonton Line.

In Money magazine's 2013 Best Places to Live rankings, Montville was ranked 13th in the nation, the second-highest among the three places in New Jersey included in the top 50 list. The township was ranked 17th in the magazine's 2011 ranking of the "Best Places to Live", the highest-ranked place in New Jersey, after having been ranked 13th in 2007. In 2009, Money magazine named Montville the 21st best place to live in the United States; the 2nd highest ranked community in New Jersey.

== History ==
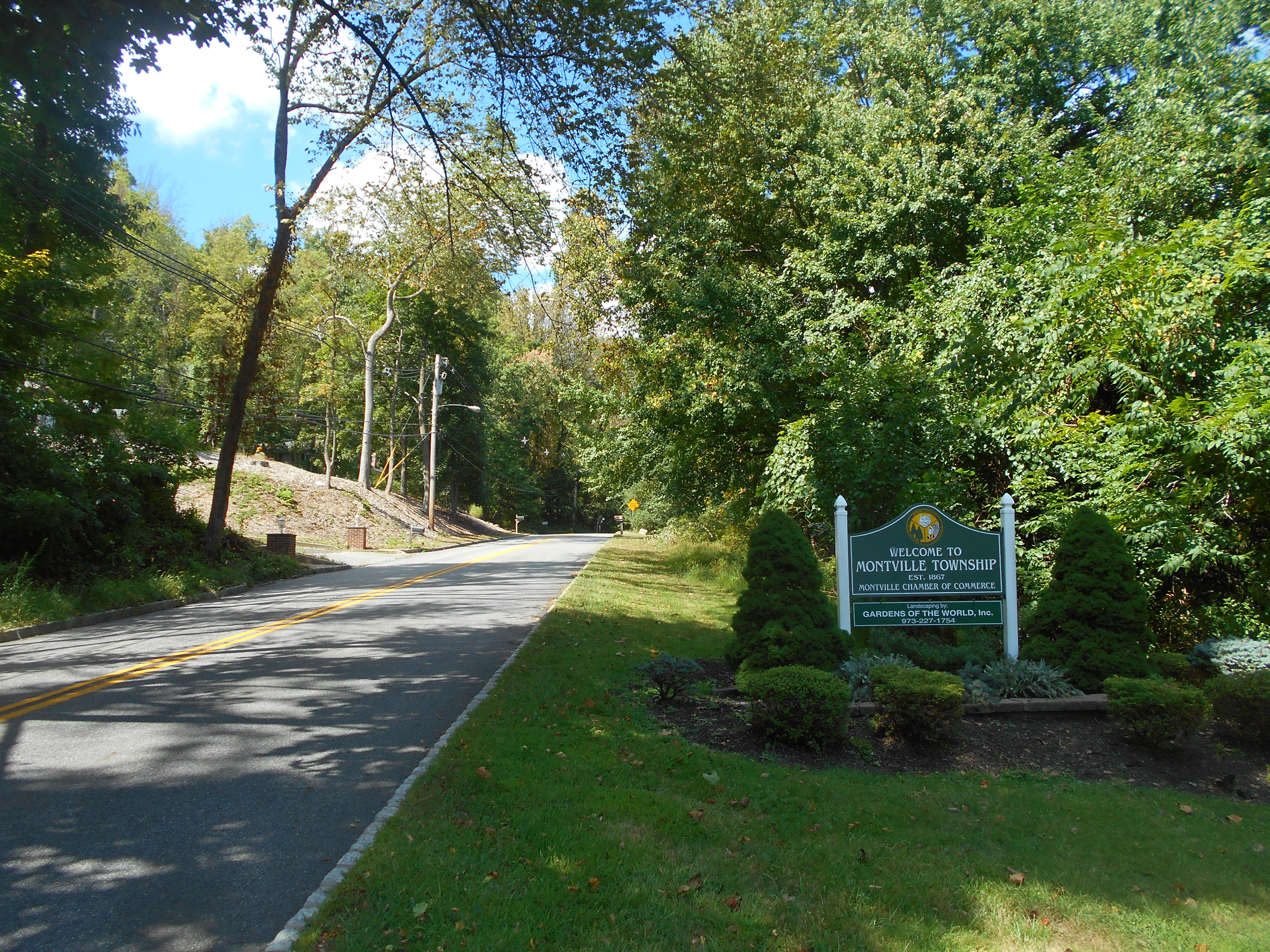
Entering Montville

=== Native settlement ===
Over 10,000 years ago, the area was part of the Lenapehoking. It was originally settled by the Lenape tribes of the Munsee dialect. The Lenape tribes maintained peace and no significant battles were recorded in the area.

On October 12, the Morris County Parks Commission holds Lenape Day at the Great Swamp to celebrate the culture and history of Ramapough Lenape people.

=== Dutch settlement ===
Dutch farmers from New Amsterdam (now part of New York City) entered the area in 1710. As part of New Netherland, the town was originally called "Uyle-Kill" (the Dutch spelling of "Owl-Kill"), a name given to the creek and valley, which ran through the area.

By the 1740s, the settlement had grown in size and construction of the first road was begun. The early road, now known as U.S. Route 202, connected various farms with Montville's first gristmill, sawmill and tanneries.

In 1756, the Dutch Reformed Church was founded in Old Boonton and moved to Montville in the early 1800s after land was purchased in Montville for a parsonage.

=== English settlement ===
In 1712, William Penn bought a tract of land that included parts of modern-day Pequannock and Montville that included Pine Brook.

In 1760, the first schoolhouse in the Montville township was built out of logs in Pine Brook. It was located on "the road leading to Boonton," which could refer to multiple northwest-facing roads including Changebridge Road. Additional schools were constructed in 1785, 1816, and 1852.

During the American Revolution (1775–1783), Montville was on a major military route from Morristown to the Hudson River. General George Washington's troops often took this route and Washington stayed in the Towaco section of what is now Montville Township in June 1780. The French troops under the leadership of General Rochambeau spent four days passing through Montville Township on their way to the War's final victory at Yorktown, Virginia, as part of a group of 5,000 soldiers, 2,000 horses, 500 oxen, possibly 900 cattle, artillery, boats and followers.

The Mandeville Inn was established circa 1770 and was pronounced "Mondeveil" by the Dutch, which in turn was corrupted to Montville. The Montville Inn was, up until July 2006, located at the site of the pre-Revolutionary War Mandeville Inn, which burned down in the early 20th century. Other sources attribute the township's name to its location in the mountains of Northern New Jersey.

In 1809, the first store in Montville was opened by Conrad Esler. In 1820, Montville contained 16 houses, two bark mills, a grist mill, a cider mill and distillery, a blacksmith shop, a carpenter shop, a wheelwright shop, and a small store; at the time, Montville was considered a business center compared to nearby towns. By 1880, it contained 40 houses, a bark mill, two grist mills, a tannery, a saw mill, a rubber factory, two blacksmith shops, two taverns and two stores.

The construction of the Morris Canal in this area was completed in 1828, bringing commercial navigation to the Montville/Towaco area. The mid-19th century saw the development of two smaller village centers set apart from Montville: Pine Brook, a fertile agricultural area in the Township's southern end, and Towaco, situated on the Morris Canal.

In 1867, Montville and Boonton split off from Pequannock township.

=== 20th century ===
By 1910, the population of Montville was 690.

The Pine Brook Speedway, which operated from July 1962 until October 1989, was designed for midget car racing and became one of the earliest sites for microstock racing. Mario Andretti raced at the track and had some of his earliest success as a race car driver at the Speedway.

== Geography ==
According to the United States Census Bureau, the township had a total area of 19.12 square miles (49.51 km^{2}), including 18.63 square miles (48.24 km^{2}) of land and 0.49 square mile (1.27 km^{2}) of water (2.57%).

Unincorporated communities, localities and place names located partially or completely within the township include Horse Neck Bridge, Lake Valhalla, Lower Montville, Pine Brook, Taylortown, Towaco and White Hall.

The township borders the municipalities of Boonton, Boonton Township, East Hanover Township, Kinnelon, Lincoln Park and Parsippany–Troy Hills in Morris County; and Fairfield Township in Essex County.

Camp Dawson is a small camp area in Towaco that is home to a variety of recreational events such as hiking, sledding, soccer, lacrosse, rugby and football. In 2007, Camp Dawson was described by Money magazine as one of reasons for ranking Montville as the 13th best smaller population place to live in the United States. Many Montville sports teams use the fields at Camp Dawson, which include two turf fields mainly used for football, soccer and lacrosse. These fields have lighting available for these teams to play at night. There was a flurry of concern in 2008, when testing of Dawson's new artificial turf playing fields showed what turned out to be a false positive finding of dangerously high levels of toxic lead.

=== Climate ===
Montville has a humid continental climate. The lowest recorded temperature in Montville is −25 °F (−32 °C), set in February 1943, and the highest recorded temperature is 105 °F (41 °C), set in July 1936 and 2011.

Climate data for Montville, New Jersey
Month	Jan	Feb	Mar	Apr	May	Jun	Jul	Aug	Sep	Oct	Nov	Dec	Year
Record high °F (°C)	71 (22)	74 (23)	85 (29)	93 (34)	96 (36)	99 (37)	105 (41)	100 (38)	100 (38)	92 (33)	81 (27)	73 (23)	105 (41)
Mean daily maximum °F (°C)	36 (2)	39 (4)	48 (9)	60 (16)	71 (22)	79 (26)	84 (29)	82 (28)	75 (24)	64 (18)	53 (12)	41 (5)	61 (16)
Mean daily minimum °F (°C)	15 (−9)	17 (−8)	25 (−4)	35 (2)	45 (7)	54 (12)	59 (15)	57 (14)	49 (9)	37 (3)	30 (−1)	21 (−6)	37 (3)
Record low °F (°C)	−24 (−31)	−25 (−32)	−10 (−23)	11 (−12)	24 (−4)	29 (−2)	36 (2)	32 (0)	24 (−4)	10 (−12)	−1 (−18)	−17 (−27)	−25 (−32)
Average precipitation inches (mm)	4.34 (110)	3.44 (87)	4.56 (116)	4.54 (115)	4.79 (122)	4.51 (115)	4.64 (118)	4.43 (113)	5.11 (130)	4.10 (104)	4.53 (115)	4.08 (104)	53.07 (1,349)

As of 2026, the township is a member of Local Leaders for Responsible Planning in order to address the township's Mount Laurel doctrine-based housing obligations.

== Demographics ==
Historical population
Census	Pop.	Note	%±
1870	1,403		—
1880	1,270		−9.5%
1890	1,333		5.0%
1900	1,908		43.1%
1910	1,944		1.9%
1920	1,515		−22.1%
1930	2,467		62.8%
1940	3,207		30.0%
1950	4,159		29.7%
1960	6,772		62.8%
1970	11,846		74.9%
1980	14,290		20.6%
1990	15,600		9.2%
2000	20,839		33.6%
2010	21,528		3.3%
2020	22,450		4.3%
2024 (est.)	24,456		8.9%
Population sources:1870–1920 1870 1880–1890; 1890–1910 1910–1930; 1940–2000 2000; 2010 2020

=== 2020 census ===
Montville township, Morris County, New Jersey – Racial and Ethnic Composition (NH = Non-Hispanic) Note: the US Census treats Hispanic/Latino as an ethnic category. This table excludes Latinos from the racial categories and assigns them to a separate category. Hispanics/Latinos may be of any race.
Race / Ethnicity	Pop 2010	Pop 2020	% 2010	% 2020
White alone (NH)	16,134	15,009	74.94%	66.86%
Black or African American alone (NH)	252	319	1.17%	1.42%
Native American or Alaska Native alone (NH)	6	18	0.03%	0.08%
Asian alone (NH)	3,885	4,811	18.05%	21.43%
Pacific Islander alone (NH)	2	6	0.01%	0.03%
Some Other Race alone (NH)	37	101	0.17%	0.45%
Mixed Race/Multi-Racial (NH)	312	608	1.45%	2.71%
Hispanic or Latino (any race)	900	1,578	4.18%	7.03%
Total	21,528	22,450	100.00%	100.00%

=== 2010 census ===
The 2010 United States census counted 21,528 people, 7,485 households, and 5,988 families in the township. The population density was 1,165.0 per square mile (449.8/km^{2}). There were 7,823 housing units at an average density of 423.3 per square mile (163.4/km^{2}). The racial makeup was 78.04% (16,800) White, 1.28% (275) Black or African American, 0.10% (22) Native American, 18.07% (3,890) Asian, 0.01% (2) Pacific Islander, 0.86% (186) from other races, and 1.64% (353) from two or more races. Hispanic or Latino of any race were 4.18% (900) of the population.

Of the 7,485 households, 39.2% had children under the age of 18; 69.9% were married couples living together; 7.4% had a female householder with no husband present and 20.0% were non-families. Of all households, 17.4% were made up of individuals and 7.8% had someone living alone who was 65 years of age or older. The average household size was 2.85 and the average family size was 3.23.

25.7% of the population were under the age of 18, 6.0% from 18 to 24, 22.0% from 25 to 44, 31.7% from 45 to 64, and 14.5% who were 65 years of age or older. The median age was 43.0 years. For every 100 females, the population had 95.7 males. For every 100 females ages 18 and older there were 90.9 males.

The Census Bureau's 2006–2010 American Community Survey showed that (in 2010 inflation-adjusted dollars) median household income was $119,493 (with a margin of error of +/− $12,959) and the median family income was $143,811 (+/− $17,082). Males had a median income of $102,178 (+/− $5,041) versus $66,933 (+/− $6,419) for females. The per capita income for the borough was $54,618 (+/− $3,849). About 2.6% of families and 3.1% of the population were below the poverty line, including 1.9% of those under age 18 and 4.4% of those age 65 or over.

Montville has had a growing influx of Asian-Americans. In 2010, 7.1% of Montville's residents self-identified as Indian-American, while 6.4% identified as Chinese-American and 2.7% of residents were Korean-American.

=== 2000 census ===
As of the 2000 United States census there were 20,839 people, 7,380 households, and 5,867 families residing in the township. The population density was 1,104.3 inhabitants per square mile (426.4/km^{2}). There were 7,541 housing units at an average density of 399.6 per square mile (154.3/km^{2}). The racial makeup of the township was 84.95% White, 0.93% African American, 0.04% Native American, 12.57% Asian, 0.02% Pacific Islander, 0.36% from other races, and 1.14% from two or more races. Hispanic or Latino of any race were 2.55% of the population.

There were 7,380 households, out of which 37.4% had children under the age of 18 living with them, 71.0% were married couples living together, 6.4% had a female householder with no husband present, and 20.5% were non-families. 16.6% of all households were made up of individuals, and 5.7% had someone living alone who was 65 years of age or older. The average household size was 2.80 and the average family size was 3.17.

In the township the population was spread out, with 25.2% under the age of 18, 5.5% from 18 to 24, 30.6% from 25 to 44, 28.0% from 45 to 64, and 10.8% who were 65 years of age or older. The median age was 39 years. For every 100 females, there were 94.7 males. For every 100 females age 18 and over, there were 91.9 males.

The median income for a household in the township was $94,557, and the median income for a family was $105,394. Males had a median income of $71,356 versus $45,427 for females. The per capita income for the township was $43,341. About 2.6% of families and 3.8% of the population were below the poverty line, including 4.4% of those under age 18 and 6.3% of those age 65 or over.

== Government ==
=== Local government ===
Montville is governed under a special charter, which was granted by an act of the New Jersey Legislature in 1867 and retains many characteristics of the Township form of government; it is one of 12 municipalities (of the 564) statewide governed by a special charter. The Township Committee is comprised of five members, who are elected directly by the voters at-large in partisan elections to serve three-year terms of office on a staggered basis, with either one or two seats coming up for election each year as part of the November general election in a three-year cycle. At an annual reorganization meeting, the Township Committee selects one of its members to serve as Mayor. The Township Administrator serves as the chief administrative and executive officer for the organization and is responsible for the day-to-day operations of all municipal departments.

As of 2023, Montville's Township Committee is comprised of Mayor Matthew S. Kayne (R, term on committee ends on December 31, 2026 and as mayor ends December 31, 2025), Deputy mayor June Witty (R, term on committee ends on December 31, 2026; term as deputy mayor ends on December 31, 2025), Richard D. Conklin (R, 2025), Richard A. Cook (R, 2025) and Frank W. Cooney (R, 2027).

A Charter Study Commission was approved by the voters on November 8, 2005, to investigate possible changes to Montville's form of government. The commission voted 4–1 against making any modifications.

The Montville Municipal Court is the judicial branch of government. The Court has original jurisdiction over Motor vehicle violations local ordinance offenses, petty disorderly person offenses, disorderly person offenses, fish and game violations, traffic and criminal offenses, weights and measure violations, and citizen complaints.

=== Federal, state and county representation ===
Montville is located in the 11th Congressional District and is part of New Jersey's 26th state legislative district.

For the 119th United States Congress, New Jersey's 11th congressional district is represented by Analilia Mejia (D, Glen Ridge) who was elected in a 2026 special election to serve for the remainder of the Congress following the resignation Mikie Sherrill (D, Montclair), who was elected Governor of New Jersey in 2025. New Jersey is represented in the United States Senate by Democrats Cory Booker (Newark, term ends 2027) and Andy Kim (Moorestown, term ends 2031).

For the 2026–2027 session, the 26th legislative district of the New Jersey Legislature is represented in the State Senate by Joseph Pennacchio (R, Rockaway Township) and in the General Assembly by Brian Bergen (R, Denville Township) and Jay Webber (R, Morris Plains).

Morris County is governed by a Board of County Commissioners comprised of seven members who are elected at-large in partisan elections to three-year terms on a staggered basis, with either one or three seats up for election each year as part of the November general election. Actual day-to-day operation of departments is supervised by County Administrator Deena Leary.

As of 2026, Morris County's Commissioners (with all terms ending December 31) are Director Stephen H. Shaw (R, Mountain Lakes, 2027), Deputy Director John Krickus (R, Washington Township, 2027), Douglas Cabana (R, Boonton Township, 2028), Thomas J. Mastrangelo (R, Montville, 2028), Christine Myers (R, Harding Township, 2028), Tayfun Selen (R, Chatham Township, 2026), and Deborah Smith (R, Denville Township, 2027).

The county's constitutional officers are County Clerk Ann F. Grossi (R, Parsippany–Troy Hills, 2028), Sheriff James M. Gannon (R, Boonton Township, 2028) and Surrogate Heather Darling (R, Roxbury, 2029).

=== Politics ===
United States presidential election results for Montville 2024 2020 2016 2012 2008 2004
Year	Republican		Democratic		Third party(ies)	
Year	No.	%	No.	%	No.	%
2024	7,282	55.40%	5,525	42.03%	338	2.57%
2020	7,199	51.08%	6,742	47.84%	152	1.08%
2016	6,440	55.09%	4,939	42.25%	311	2.66%
2012	6,460	60.36%	4,101	38.32%	142	1.33%
2008	6,720	58.11%	4,761	41.17%	84	0.73%
2004	6,605	59.16%	4,483	40.15%	77	0.69%

As of June 2021, there were a total of 17,735 registered voters in Montville Township, of which 4,446 (25%) were registered as Democrats, 6,490 (36.5%) were registered as Republicans, with the majority of the remaining 6,799 (38.3%) registered as Unaffiliated.

In the 2020 presidential election, Republican Donald Trump received 50.86% of the vote (7,199 cast), ahead of Democrat Joe Biden with 47.63% (6,742 votes), and other candidates with 1.5% (213 votes). In the 2016 presidential election, Republican Donald Trump received 55.1% of the vote (6,440 cast), ahead of Democrat Hillary Clinton with 42.5% (4,939 votes), and other candidates with 2.7% (311 votes), among the 11,690 ballots cast. In the 2012 presidential election, Republican Mitt Romney received 60.4% of the vote (6,460 cast), ahead of Democrat Barack Obama with 38.3% (4,101 votes), and other candidates with 1.3% (142 votes), among the 10,749 ballots cast by the township's 15,001 registered voters (46 ballots were spoiled), for a turnout of 71.7%. In the 2008 presidential election, Republican John McCain received 57.8% of the vote (6,720 cast), ahead of Democrat Barack Obama with 41.0% (4,761 votes) and other candidates with 0.7% (84 votes), among the 11,623 ballots cast by the township's 14,890 registered voters, for a turnout of 78.1%. In the 2004 presidential election, Republican George W. Bush received 59.0% of the vote (6,605 ballots cast), outpolling Democrat John Kerry with 40.0% (4,483 votes) and other candidates with 0.5% (77 votes), among the 11,203 ballots cast by the township's 14,582 registered voters, for a turnout percentage of 76.8.

Gubernatorial election results for Montville
Year	Republican		Democratic		Third party(ies)	
Year	No.	%	No.	%	No.	%
2025	5,820	55.25%	4,669	44.33%	44	0.42%
2021	5,348	60.69%	3,419	38.80%	45	0.51%
2017	3,770	59.50%	2,480	39.14%	86	1.36%
2013	4,703	74.75%	1,515	24.08%	74	1.18%
2009	4,679	62.06%	2,278	30.22%	582	7.72%
2005	3,912	55.69%	2,970	42.28%	143	2.04%

In the 2013 gubernatorial election, Republican Chris Christie received 74.7% of the vote (4,703 cast), ahead of Democrat Barbara Buono with 24.1% (1,515 votes), and other candidates with 1.2% (74 votes), among the 6,389 ballots cast by the township's 14,958 registered voters (97 ballots were spoiled), for a turnout of 42.7%. In the 2009 gubernatorial election, Republican Chris Christie received 61.6% of the vote (4,679 ballots cast), ahead of Democrat Jon Corzine with 30.0% (2,278 votes), Independent Chris Daggett with 6.8% (513 votes) and other candidates with 0.9% (69 votes), among the 7,593 ballots cast by the township's 14,526 registered voters, yielding a 52.3% turnout.

United States Senate election results for Montville1
Year	Republican		Democratic		Third party(ies)	
Year	No.	%	No.	%	No.	%
2024	6,936	55.34%	5,342	42.62%	255	2.03%
2018	5,687	57.96%	3,852	39.26%	273	2.78%
2012	5,741	59.11%	3,874	39.88%	98	1.01%
2006	4,022	57.91%	2,830	40.75%	93	1.34%

United States Senate election results for Montville2
Year	Republican		Democratic		Third party(ies)	
Year	No.	%	No.	%	No.	%
2020	7,238	52.83%	6,335	46.24%	127	0.93%
2014	3,191	60.49%	2,017	38.24%	67	1.27%
2013	2,791	61.39%	1,731	38.08%	24	0.53%
2008	6,104	58.32%	4,256	40.67%	106	1.01%

== Education ==
Montville School House, 1910

The Montville Township School District serves public school students in pre-kindergarten through twelfth grade. As of the 2022–23 school year, the district, comprised of seven schools, had an enrollment of 3,469 students and 348.5 classroom teachers (on an FTE basis), for a student–teacher ratio of 10.0:1. Schools in the district (with 2022–23 enrollment data from the National Center for Education Statistics) are Cedar Hill Elementary School with 328 students in grades PreK-5, Hilldale Elementary School with 320 students in grades K-5, William H. Mason Jr. Elementary School with 277 students in grades K-5, Valley View Elementary School with 365 students in grades PreK-5, Woodmont Elementary School with 310 students in grades K-5, Robert R. Lazar Middle School with 724 students in grades 6-8 and Montville Township High School with 1,112 students in grades 9-12. InIn 2016, Cedar Hill Elementary School was one of ten schools in New Jersey recognized as a National Blue Ribbon School by the United States Department of Education. In 2024, Hilldale Elementary School was one of 11 statewide that was recognized as a Blue Ribbon School of Excellence.

Private schools include Trinity Christian School, a Christian day school founded in 1986 that serves students in Kindergarten through 12th grade. St. Pius X School was a K–8 Catholic school that operated under the auspices of the Roman Catholic Diocese of Paterson until it closed after the 2017–2018 school year after enrollment numbers for the 2018–2019 school year were just more than half of the 250 students needed to remain financially viable.

== Community ==
Montville Day is celebrated every year in the fall. It brings members of the community together to enjoy food and entertainment.

== Transportation ==
=== Roads and highways ===
As of May 2010, the township had a total of 121.75 miles (195.94 km) of roadways, of which 100.98 miles (162.51 km) were maintained by the municipality, 13.91 miles (22.39 km) by Morris County and 6.86 miles (11.04 km) by the New Jersey Department of Transportation.

Major routes that pass through include Interstate 287 and U.S. Route 202 in the north, and both Interstate 80 and U.S. Route 46 in the south. Both interstates house interchanges in the township.

=== Public transportation ===
As part of its Midtown Direct expansion program, NJ Transit, with supplemental funding from the Township of Montville, renovated the Towaco train station using a design hearkening back to the early 1900s. Service is provided on the Montclair-Boonton Line from Towaco to Penn Station in Midtown Manhattan via a transfer in Montclair through Newark to Manhattan.

NJ Transit offers bus service to and from Newark on the 29 route, with local service available on the 871 and 874 routes, replacing service that had been offered on the MCM1 route until 2010, when subsidies to the local provider were eliminated as part of budget cuts.

Lakeland Bus Lines offers service along Route 46 between Dover and the Port Authority Bus Terminal in Midtown Manhattan and along Route 80 between Newton and New York City.

== Notable people ==
People who were born in, residents of, or otherwise closely associated with Montville include:

- Omar Amanat (born c. 1972), entrepreneur, investor and chairman of the Aman Resorts Group
- Lester Archambeau (born 1967), former professional football player
- Stacey Bradford, financial journalist, author and commentator; author of The Wall Street Journal Financial Guidebook for New Parents
- Chris Brauchle (born 1967), coach and former professional soccer player who played for the MetroStars in Major League Soccer
- Hector A. Cafferata Jr. (1929–2016), United States Marine awarded the Medal of Honor for his heroic service at the Battle of Chosin Reservoir during the Korean War
- John H. Capstick (1856–1918), represented 5th congressional district from 1918 to 1919
- Albert Stanburrough Cook (1853–1927), professor of English
- Bruce Driver (born 1962), former professional hockey player for the New Jersey Devils and New York Rangers
- Dilly Duka (born 1989), soccer player who currently plays for Columbus Crew in Major League Soccer
- Ulric Ellerhusen (1879–1957), sculptor best known for his works of architectural sculpture
- Lauren English (born 1989), swimmer who set the United States Open Record in the 50m backstroke
- Ashley Lauren Fisher (born 1975), actress, model and spinal cord injury activist
- Ron Galella (1931–2022), photographer called "the Godfather of the U.S. paparazzi culture", known for his photos of (and battles with) Jacqueline Kennedy Onassis and Marlon Brando
- Teresa Giudice (born 1972), featured on The Real Housewives of New Jersey
- Nolan Kasper (born 1989), former World Cup alpine ski racer
- Hank Lyon (born 1988), member of the Morris County Board of Chosen Freeholders, who became the state's youngest freeholder when he took office in 2012
- Frank Mattiace (born 1961), former professional football nose tackle and coach
- Joseph McKenna (born 1995), American freestyle and graduated folkstyle wrestler
- Kristen McNabb (born 1994), soccer defender who plays for Seattle Reign FC of the National Women's Soccer League
- Carol J. Murphy (1932–2011), member of the New Jersey General Assembly from 1992 to 2000
- Dan O'Dowd (born 1959), former general manager of the Colorado Rockies
- Joseph Pennacchio (born 1955), member of the New Jersey Senate
- Jim Price (born 1966), former professional football player with the Dallas Cowboys
- Alan Sepinwall (born 1973), television reviewer
- Olivia Blois Sharpe, cast member of reality show Jerseylicious
- Dena Tauriello, drummer for the rock band Antigone Rising
- Buddy Valastro (born 1977), celebrity chef, entrepreneur, and reality television personality who is the owner of Carlo's Bakery and star of the TV series Cake Boss
- Walter D. Van Riper (1895–1973), Attorney General of New Jersey from 1944 to 1948
- James P. Vreeland (1910–2001), former mayor of Montville who served for 10 years in the New Jersey Senate
- Travis Warech (born 1991), professional basketball player for Israeli team Hapoel Be'er Sheva
- John Wurts (1792–1861), member of the United States House of Representatives from Pennsylvania
- Pete Yorn (born 1974), singer-songwriter
- Michael Zheng (born 2004), professional tennis player
