= Jacob Wise Neighbor House =

Historic house in New Jersey, United States

- U.S. National Register of Historic Places
- New Jersey Register of Historic Places
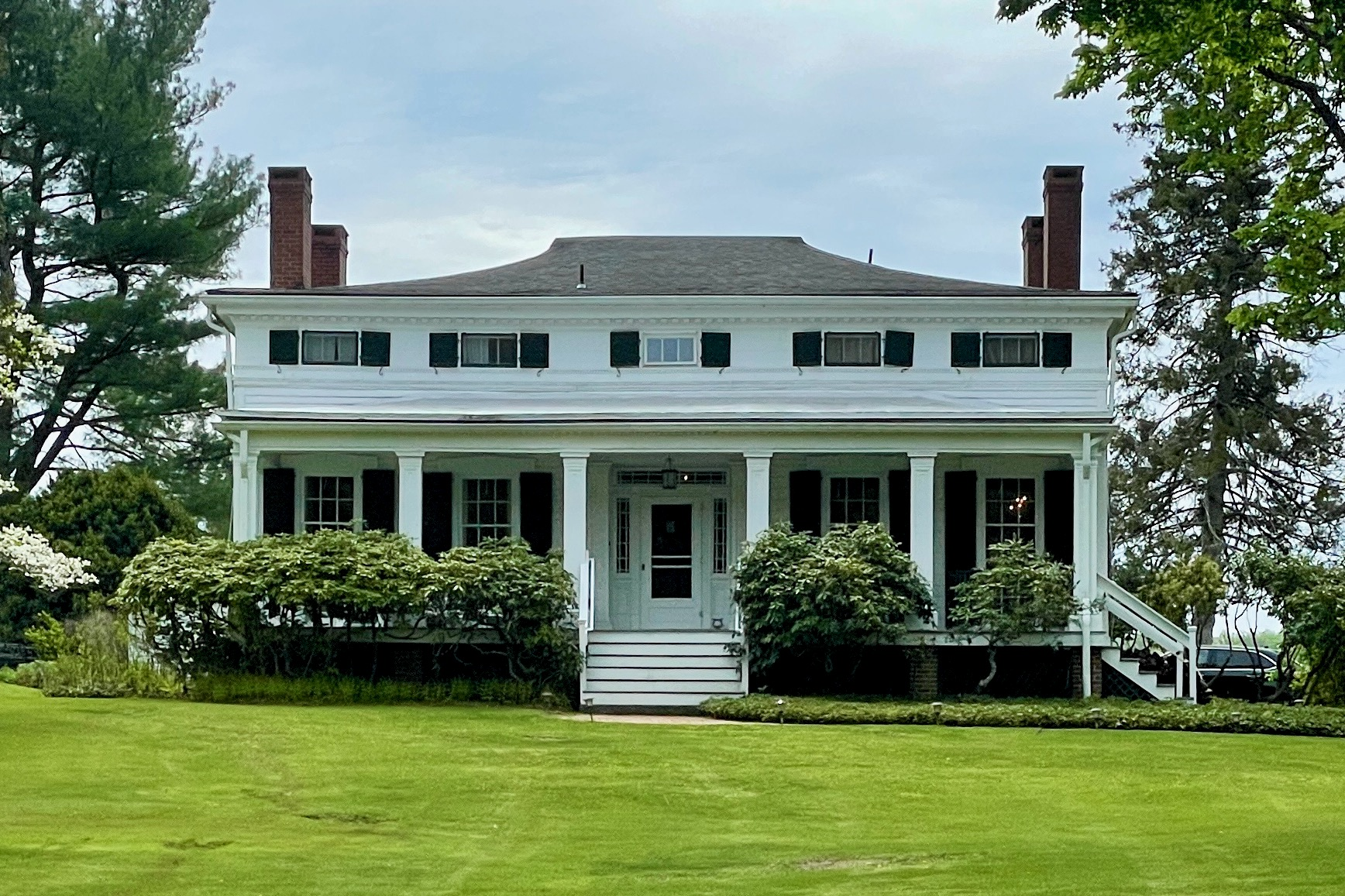
- J. W. Neighbor House in 2021

- Location within Morris County, New Jersey Location within New Jersey Location within the United States
- Location: 143 West Mill Road, Washington Township, New Jersey
- Nearest city: Long Valley, New Jersey
- Coordinates: 40°46′42″N 74°47′26″W
- Area: 3.5 acres (1.4 ha)
- Built: 1830
- Architectural style: Greek Revival
- NRHP reference No.: 91000111
- NJRHP No.: 2262

Significant dates
- Added to NRHP: February 22, 1991
- Designated NJRHP: January 14, 1991

The Jacob Wise Neighbor House is a historic house built c. 1830 and located at 143 West Mill Road near Long Valley in Washington Township, Morris County, New Jersey. The J. W. Neighbor House was added to the National Register of Historic Places on February 22, 1991, for its significance in architecture. The 3.5-acre (1.4 ha) property overlooks the valley formed by the South Branch Raritan River. It is now the Neighbour House Bed & Breakfast.

== History ==
Leonard Neighbor (1698–1766), born Leanhart Nachbar, was a Moravian settler who moved here in 1738. His great-grandson, Jacob Wise (J. W.) Neighbor (1805–1889) purchased this subdivision in 1830 and likely built the house soon after. Jacob's brother, Leonard Neighbor (1802–1880), owned the nearby Leonard Neighbor Farmstead, also listed on the NRHP.

== Description ==
The house is a two-story frame house, nearly square is shape, and built with Greek Revival style. It has a low hip roof. The front facade features a one-story porch spanning the length of the building.

== See also ==
- National Register of Historic Places listings in Morris County, New Jersey
- German Valley Historic District
