= Middle Valley, New Jersey =

Populated place in Morris County, New Jersey, US

- Unincorporated community
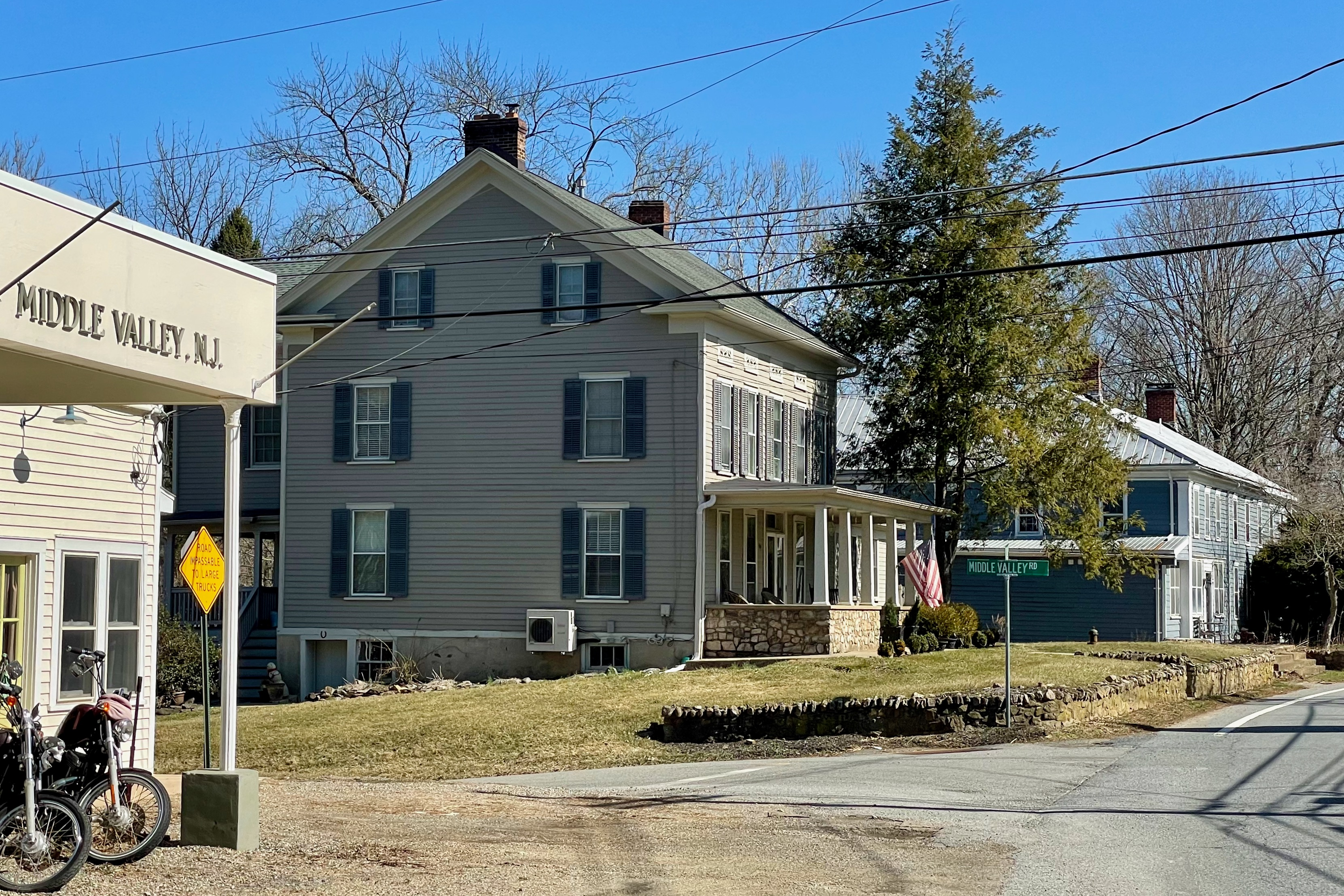
- Houses by the former Middle Valley Post Office

- Location within Morris County, New Jersey Location within New Jersey Location within the United States
- Coordinates: 40°45′38″N 74°49′14″W
- Country: United States
- State: New Jersey
- County: Morris
- Township: Washington
- Elevation: 515 ft (157 m)
- GNIS feature ID: 878309

Middle Valley is an unincorporated community located along Middle Valley Road and County Route 513 (West Mill Road) in Washington Township, Morris County, New Jersey. It is located near Long Valley within the valley of the South Branch Raritan River. The Middle Valley Historic District was listed on the state and national registers of historic places in 1989 and 1990.

== History ==
Middle Valley was initially settled in between 1750 and 1780. The oldest part of the David Miller House was probably built c. 1750.

By the 1860s, the community had several established businesses, including the Dufford Mills and the general store built c. 1794 by David Miller. The chapel, now the Middle Valley Community Center, is built over the stone foundation of that general store.

== Historic district ==
- Middle Valley Historic District
- U.S. National Register of Historic Places
- U.S. Historic district
- New Jersey Register of Historic Places
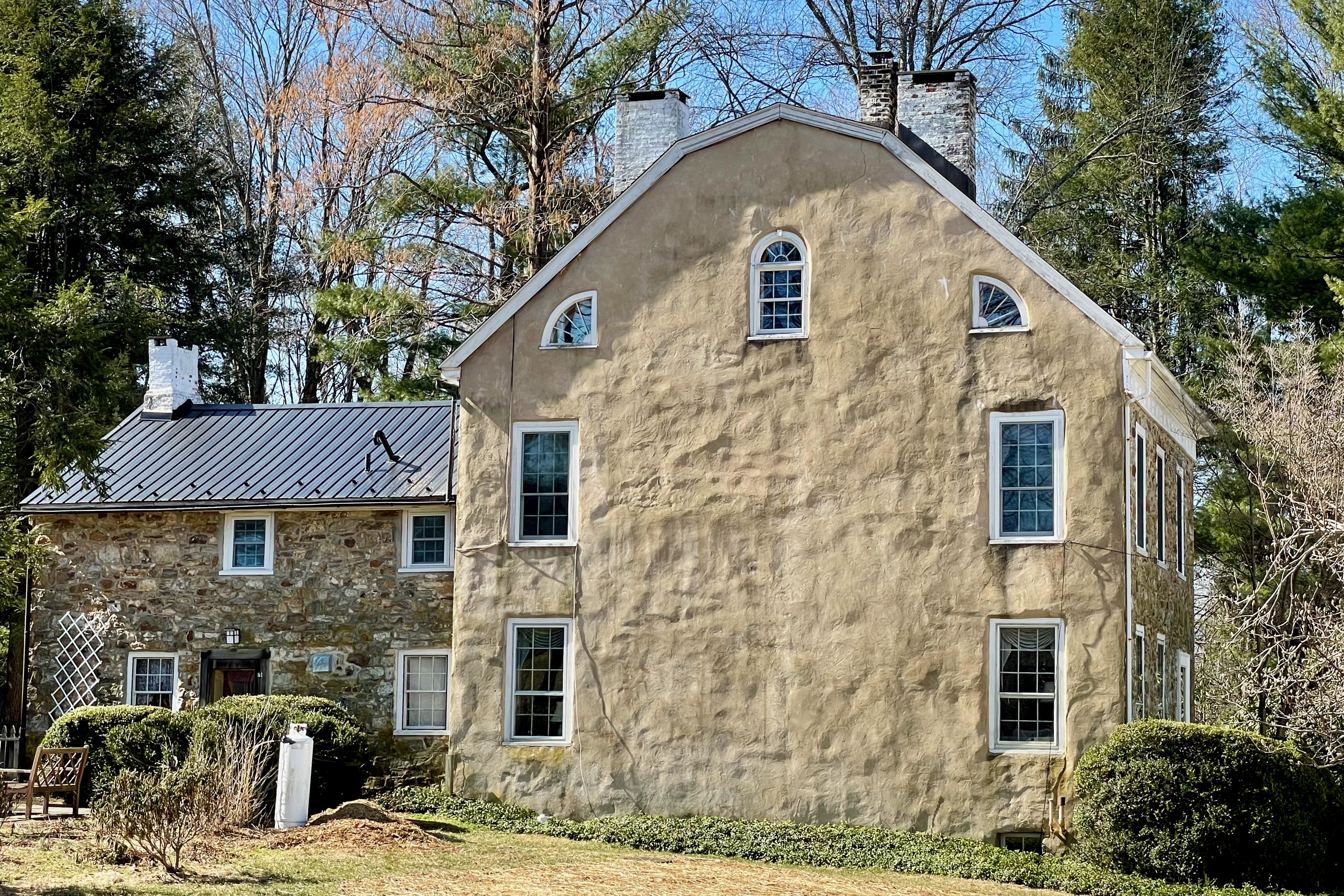
- David Miller House
- Location: West Mill, Middle Valley, and Beacon Hill roads
- Nearest city: Long Valley, New Jersey
- Area: 370 acres (150 ha)
- Architectural style: Greek Revival, Italianate, Queen Anne
- NRHP reference No.: 89002353
- NJRHP No.: 2261

Significant dates
- Added to NRHP: September 25, 1990
- Designated NJRHP: December 15, 1989

The Middle Valley Historic District is a 370-acre (150 ha) historic district encompassing the community along West Mill, Middle Valley, and Beacon Hill roads. It was added to the National Register of Historic Places on September 25, 1990, for its significance in agriculture, architecture, commerce, industry, community planning and development. The district includes 88 contributing buildings, three contributing structures, and 16 contributing sites.

Buttonball Farm at 25 Middle Valley Road was built c. 1870 with Italianate style. The William Naughright House was built c. 1881 with Queen Anne style and features scalloped shingles and elaborate corbels and balusters on the porch. The Levi Farrow House, built c. 1866, features ornate scrollwork under the eaves and windows with projected round arch molding.

== Gallery ==
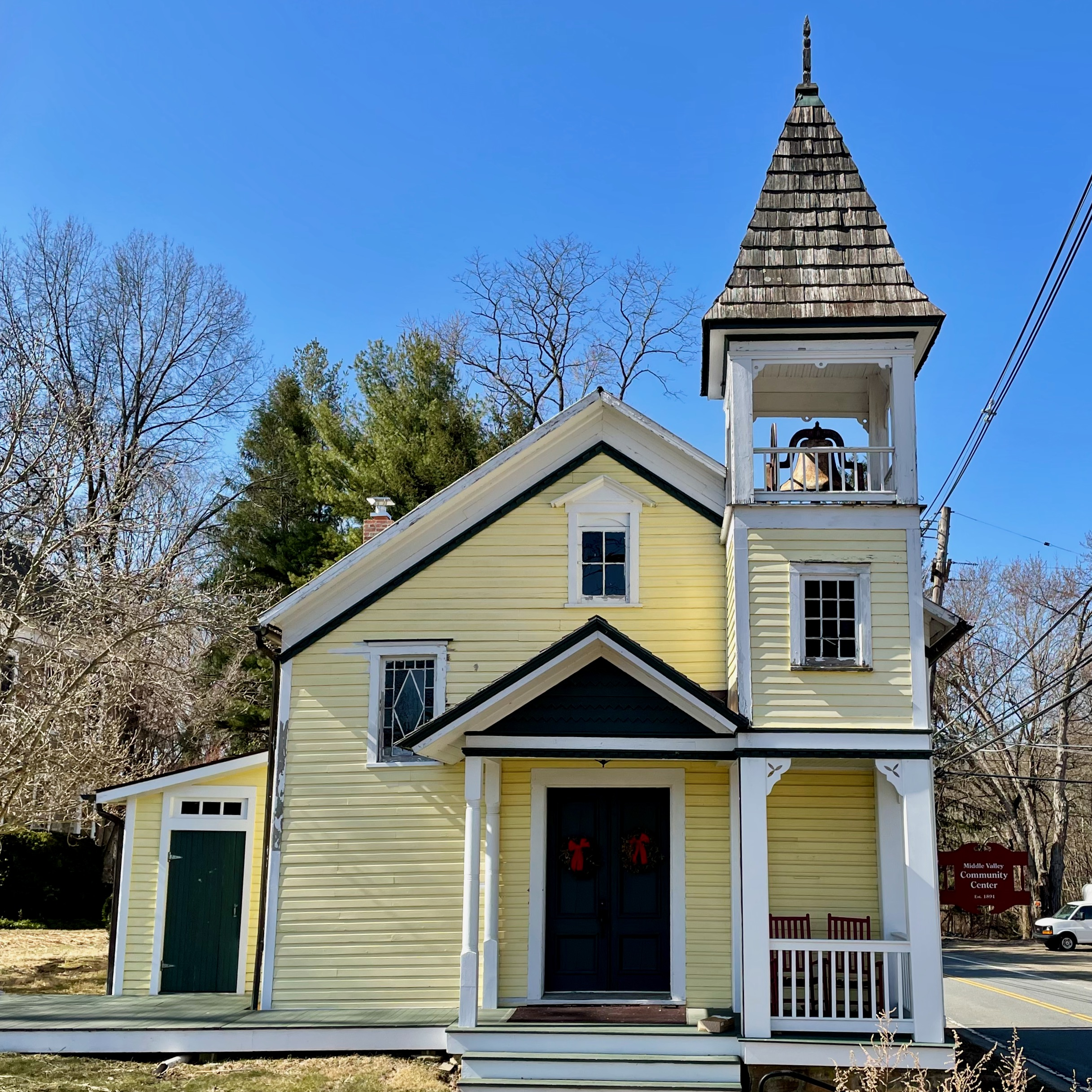
The chapel, now the Middle Valley Community Center

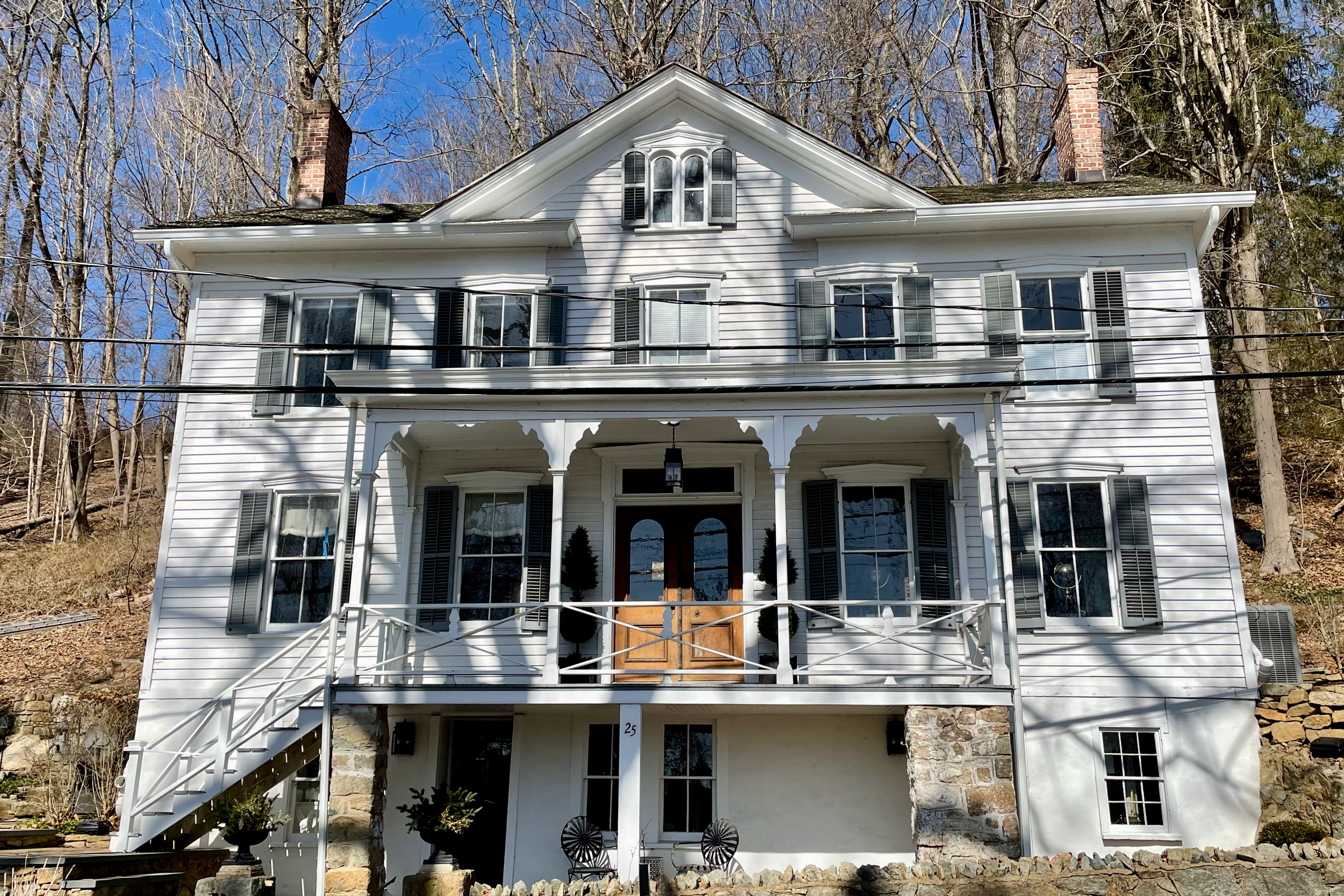
Buttonball Farm

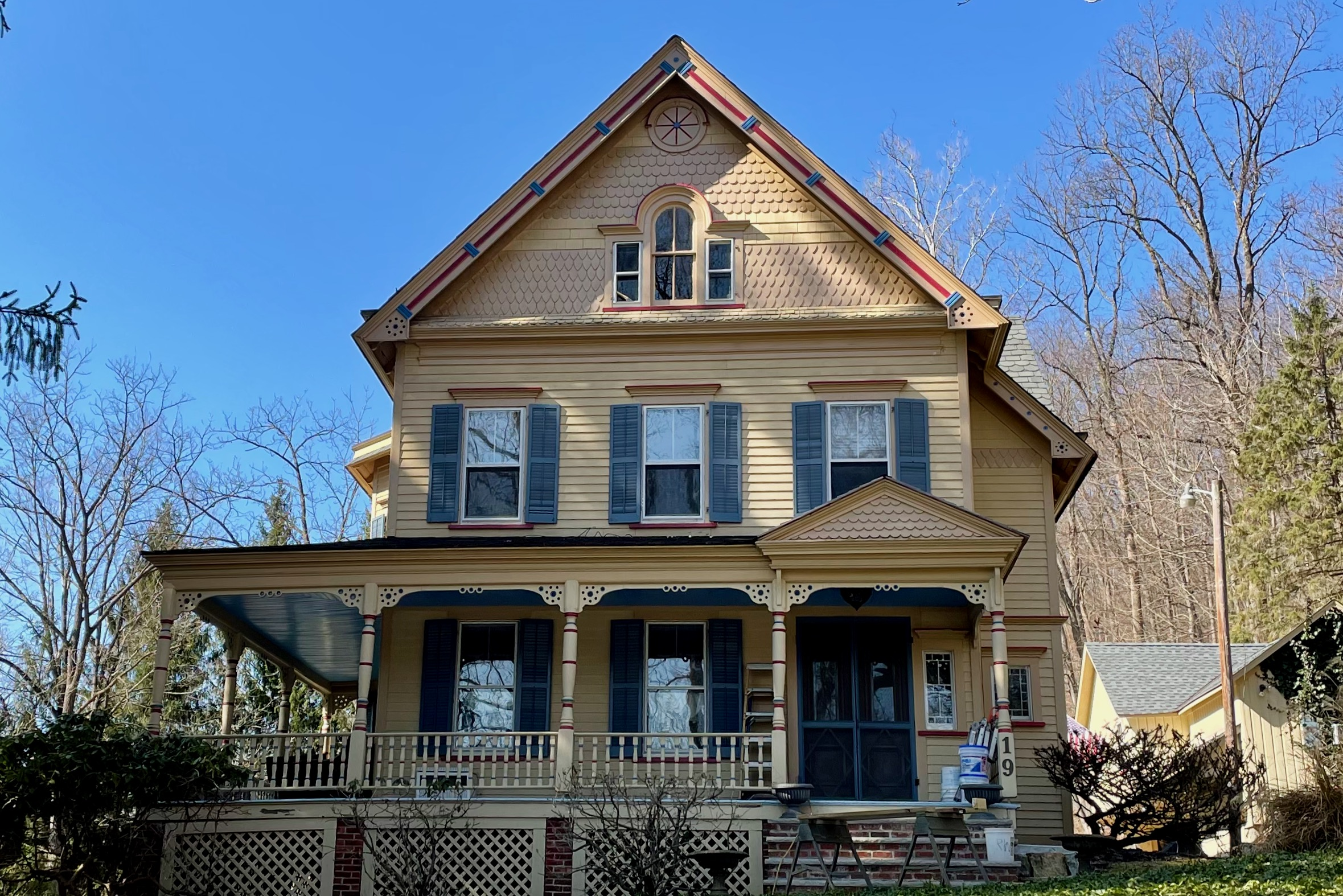
William Naughright House

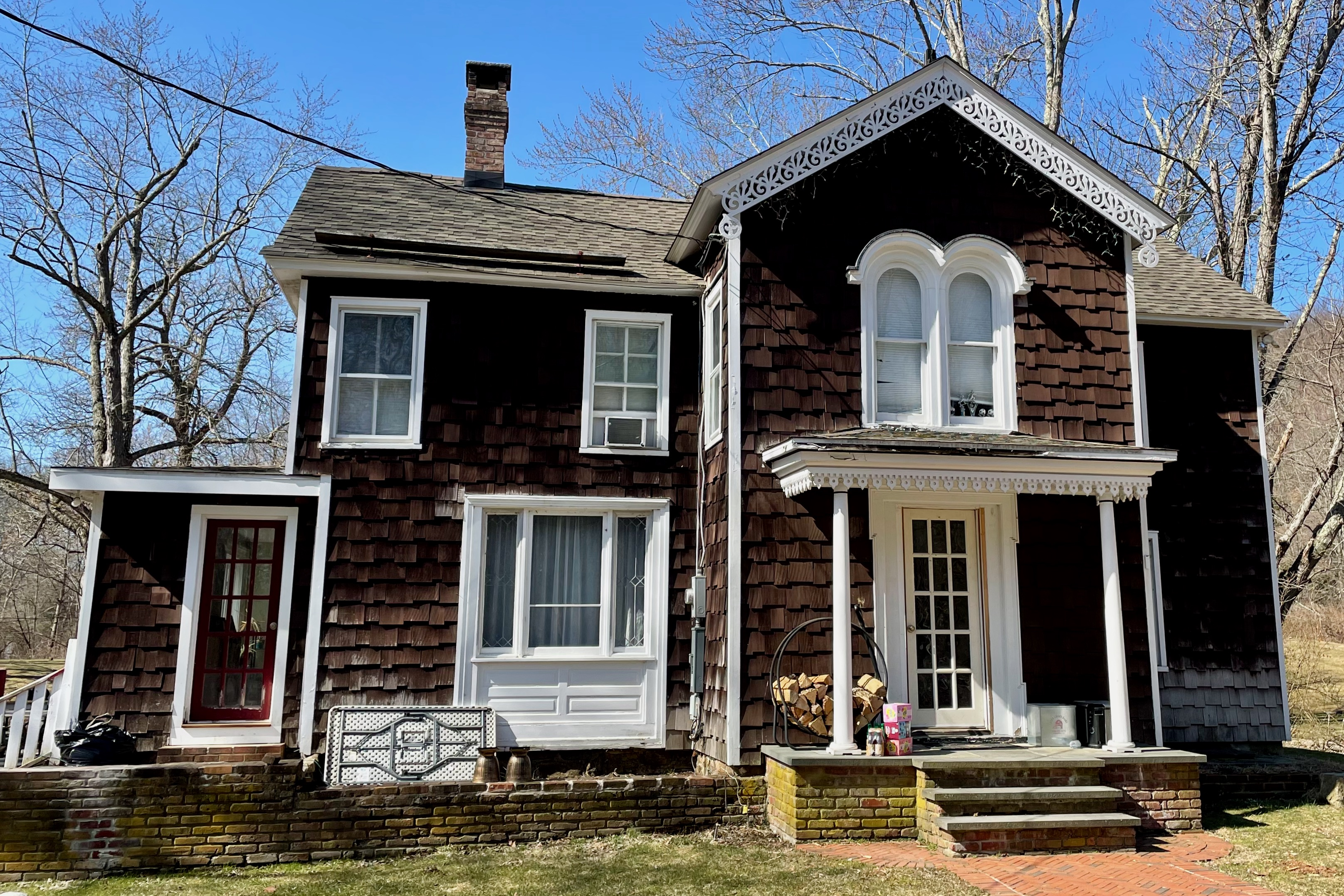
Levi Farrow House

== See also ==
- National Register of Historic Places listings in Morris County, New Jersey
- German Valley Historic District
- Lower Valley, New Jersey
