= Leonard Neighbor Farmstead =

Historic house in New Jersey, United States

- U.S. National Register of Historic Places
- New Jersey Register of Historic Places
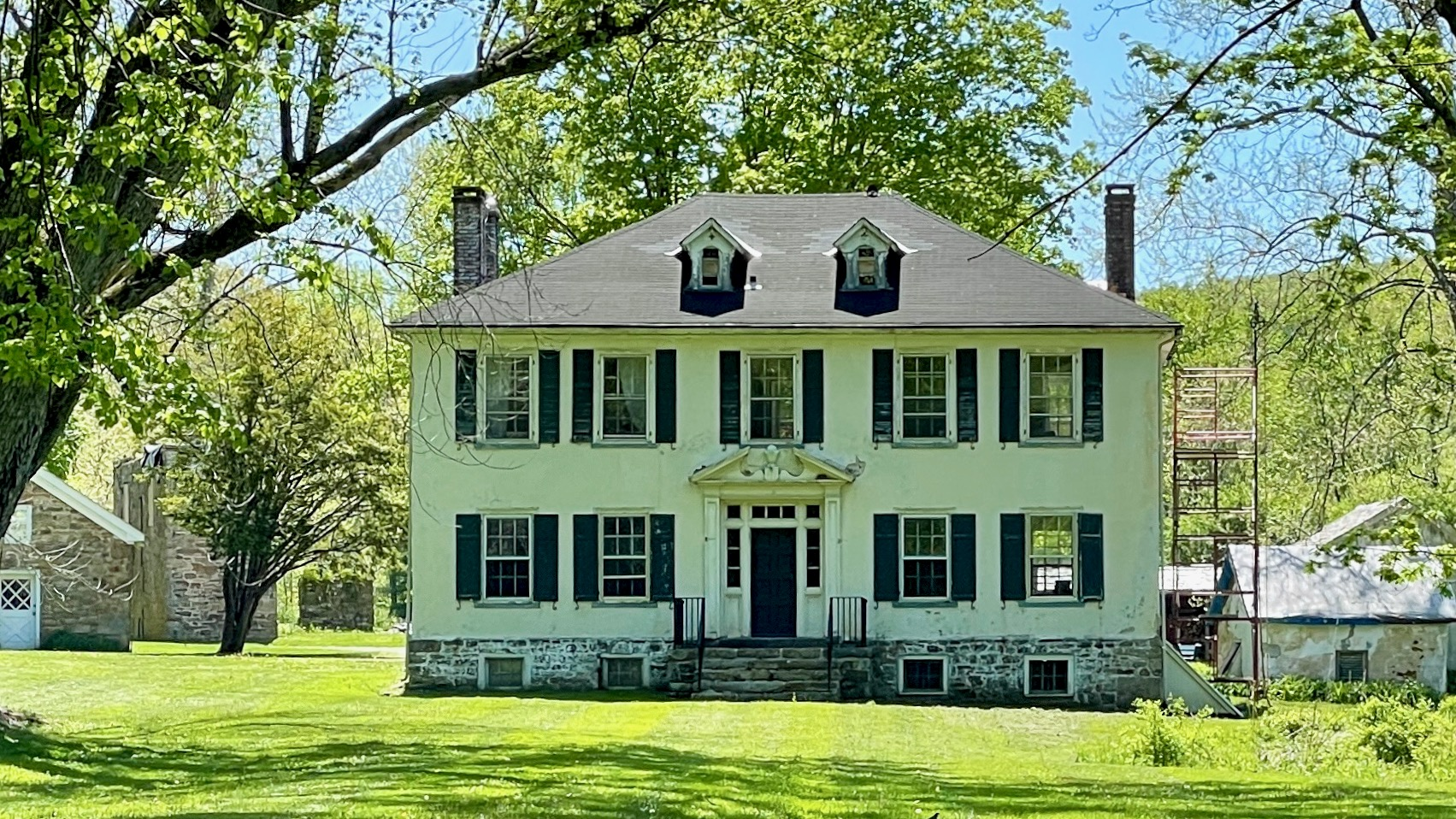
- Leonard Neighbor Farmstead in 2021

- Location within Morris County, New Jersey Location within New Jersey Location within the United States
- Location: 177 West Mill Road, Washington Township, New Jersey
- Nearest city: Long Valley, New Jersey
- Coordinates: 40°46′24″N 74°47′37″W
- Area: 122 acres (49 ha)
- Architectural style: Greek Revival, Federal
- MPS: Stone Houses and Outbuildings in Washington Township
- NRHP reference No.: 92000374
- NJRHP No.: 2263

Significant dates
- Added to NRHP: May 1, 1992
- Designated NJRHP: March 9, 1992

The Leonard Neighbor Farmstead is a historic house located at 177 West Mill Road near Long Valley in Washington Township, Morris County, New Jersey. It was added to the National Register of Historic Places on May 1, 1992, for its significance in architecture. The farm overlooks the valley formed by the South Branch Raritan River. The house is part of the Stone Houses and Outbuildings in Washington Township Multiple Property Submission (MPS).

== History ==
Leonard Neighbor (1698–1766), born Leanhart Nachbar, was a Moravian settler who moved here in 1738. His great-grandson, Leonard Neighbor (1802–1880) purchased this subdivision in 1829. Leonard's brother, Jacob Wise Neighbor (1805–1889), owned the nearby Jacob Wise Neighbor House, also listed on the NRHP.

== Description ==
The main house is a 2 1/2-story stone building with a hip roof. It was built c. 1830–1840 with Federal/Greek Revival style. The 122-acre (49 ha) property has five contributing buildings, including the main house, an English barn and a spring/wash house.

== See also ==
- National Register of Historic Places listings in Morris County, New Jersey
- German Valley Historic District
