= Lower Valley, New Jersey =

Populated place in Hunterdon County, New Jersey, US

- Unincorporated community
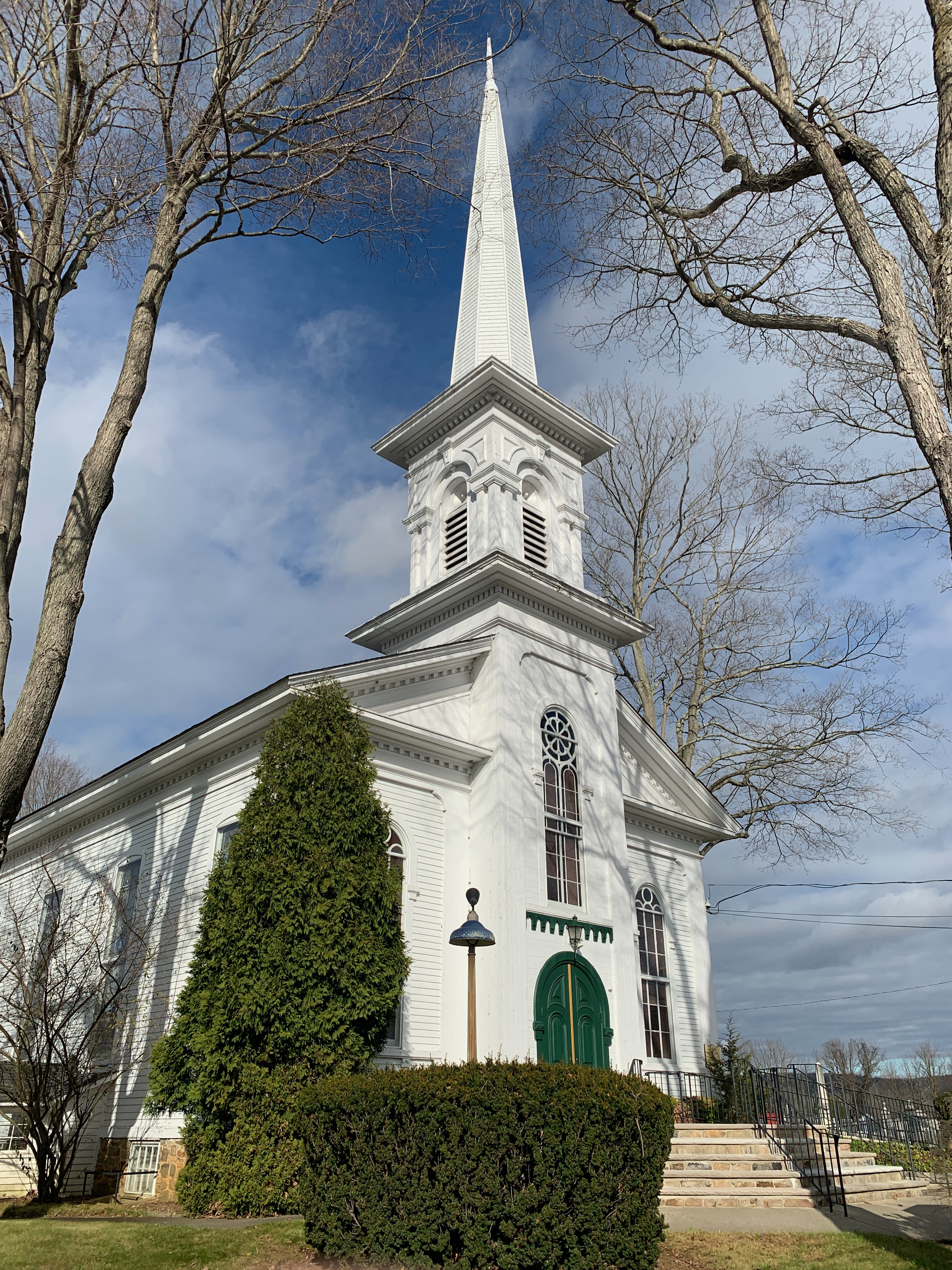
- Lower Valley Presbyterian Church

- Location within Hunterdon County, New Jersey Location within New Jersey Location within the United States
- Coordinates: 40°43′36″N 74°50′38″W
- Country: United States
- State: New Jersey
- County: Hunterdon
- Borough and Township: Califon and Lebanon
- Elevation: 594 ft (181 m)
- GNIS feature ID: 877975

Lower Valley is an unincorporated community located along County Route 513 (High Bridge-Califon Road) in Califon Borough and Lebanon Township of Hunterdon County, New Jersey. It is at the western end of Long Valley, historically known as German Valley, the valley of the South Branch Raritan River south of Schooley's Mountain.

== History ==
Settlers came here as early as 1735. By the late 19th century, the community had a church, schoolhouse, post office, and about a dozen houses. The post office was started in 1866, but renamed and moved to Califon in 1877. In 1918, parts of the community, including the church and cemetery, were incorporated into the Borough of Califon.

The Lower Valley Presbyterian Church was built in 1871. The congregation was formally established in 1872 and included many members of the Presbyterian Church at German Valley. The first pastor was Reverend I. A. Blauvelt, who also preached at German Valley. The Lower Valley Union Cemetery is next to, but not affiliated with the church.

== See also ==
- German Valley Historic District
- Middle Valley, New Jersey
