= Anthony–Corwin Farm =

Historic house in New Jersey, United States

- U.S. National Register of Historic Places
- New Jersey Register of Historic Places
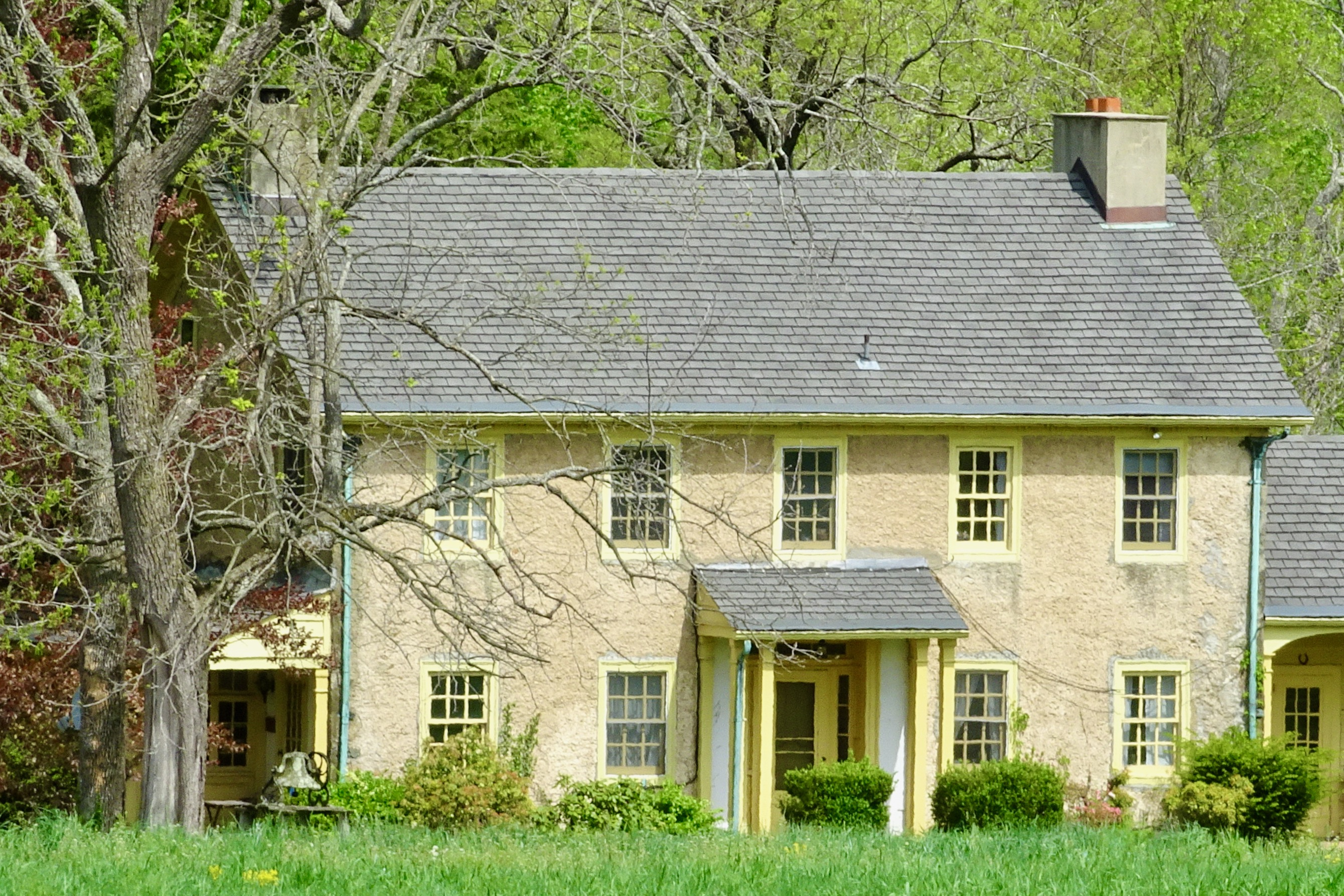
- Anthony–Corwin Farm in 2021

- Location within Morris County, New Jersey Location within New Jersey Location within the United States
- Location: 244 West Mill Road, Washington Township, New Jersey
- Nearest city: Long Valley, New Jersey
- Coordinates: 40°46′14″N 74°48′17″W
- Area: 11.5 acres (4.7 ha)
- Architectural style: Colonial Revival, Greek Revival
- MPS: Stone Houses and Outbuildings in Washington Township
- NRHP reference No.: 92000371
- NJRHP No.: 2256

Significant dates
- Added to NRHP: May 1, 1992
- Designated NJRHP: March 9, 1992

The Anthony–Corwin Farm is a historic farmhouse located at 244 West Mill Road near Long Valley in Washington Township, Morris County, New Jersey. It was added to the National Register of Historic Places on May 1, 1992, for its significance in architecture. The 11.5-acre (4.7 ha) farm overlooks the valley formed by the South Branch Raritan River. The farmhouse is part of the Stone Houses and Outbuildings in Washington Township Multiple Property Submission (MPS).

== History ==
In the 1840s, Jacob Anthony (1794–1863) owned the farm and likely built the stone farmhouse with Greek Revival style. It remained in the Anthony family until 1934 when it was sold to Grace Louise Corwin. The farmhouse was then remodeled c. 1935 with Colonial Revival style.

== Description ==
The main block of the farmhouse is a two-story stone building with a gable roof. On the east is a one-story frame kitchen wing added c. 1935. The property has four contributing buildings, including the main house, a barn and wagon house.

== Gallery ==
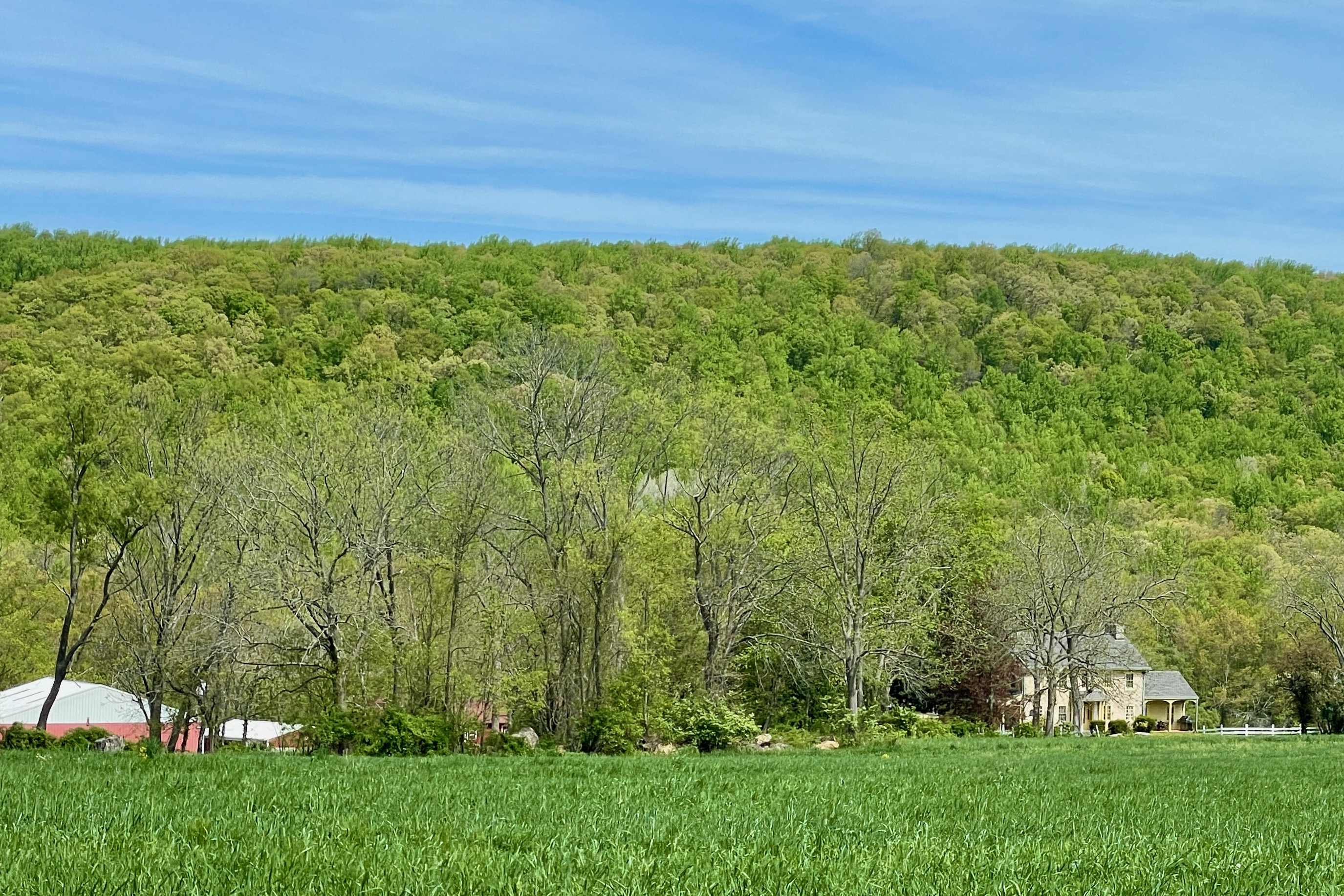
Area view of the farm in the South Branch Raritan River valley, Schooley's Mountain in the background

== See also ==
- National Register of Historic Places listings in Morris County, New Jersey
- German Valley Historic District
