= Mike Rossi =

Mike Rossi or Michael Rossi may refer to:

- Mike Rossi (DJ) (born 1967), Philadelphia-area DJ accused of cheating in the Lehigh Valley marathon
- Mike Rossi (freestyle skier) (born 1994), American freestyle skier
- Michael Rossi (Peyton Place), a fictional character in the novel Peyton Place
- Michael Matteo Rossi (born 1987), American film producer, writer and director
- Francis Rossi (born 1949), frontman of the band Status Quo who was known as Mike Rossi early in his career
- Michael Rossi (born 1959), associate of American serial killer John Wayne Gacy

== See also ==
- Michaël Rossi (born 1988), a French racing driver
