= Paul Schmidtberger =

American author

Paul Schmidtberger is an American author based in Paris, France.

== Biography ==
He is the author of Design Flaws of the Human Condition, an urban comedy of adultery published by Random House in 2007.

Originally from Schooley's Mountain in Washington Township, Morris County, New Jersey, Schmidtberger attended the Lawrenceville School and is a graduate of Yale College and Stanford Law School.

Schmidtberger was a practicing lawyer specialized in intellectual property and international arbitration, but now writes full-time. He has written articles for numerous US publications, including The New York Times, and is working on a new novel. He has lived in Paris for over twelve years.
