= Mike Rossi (freestyle skier) =

American freestyle skier

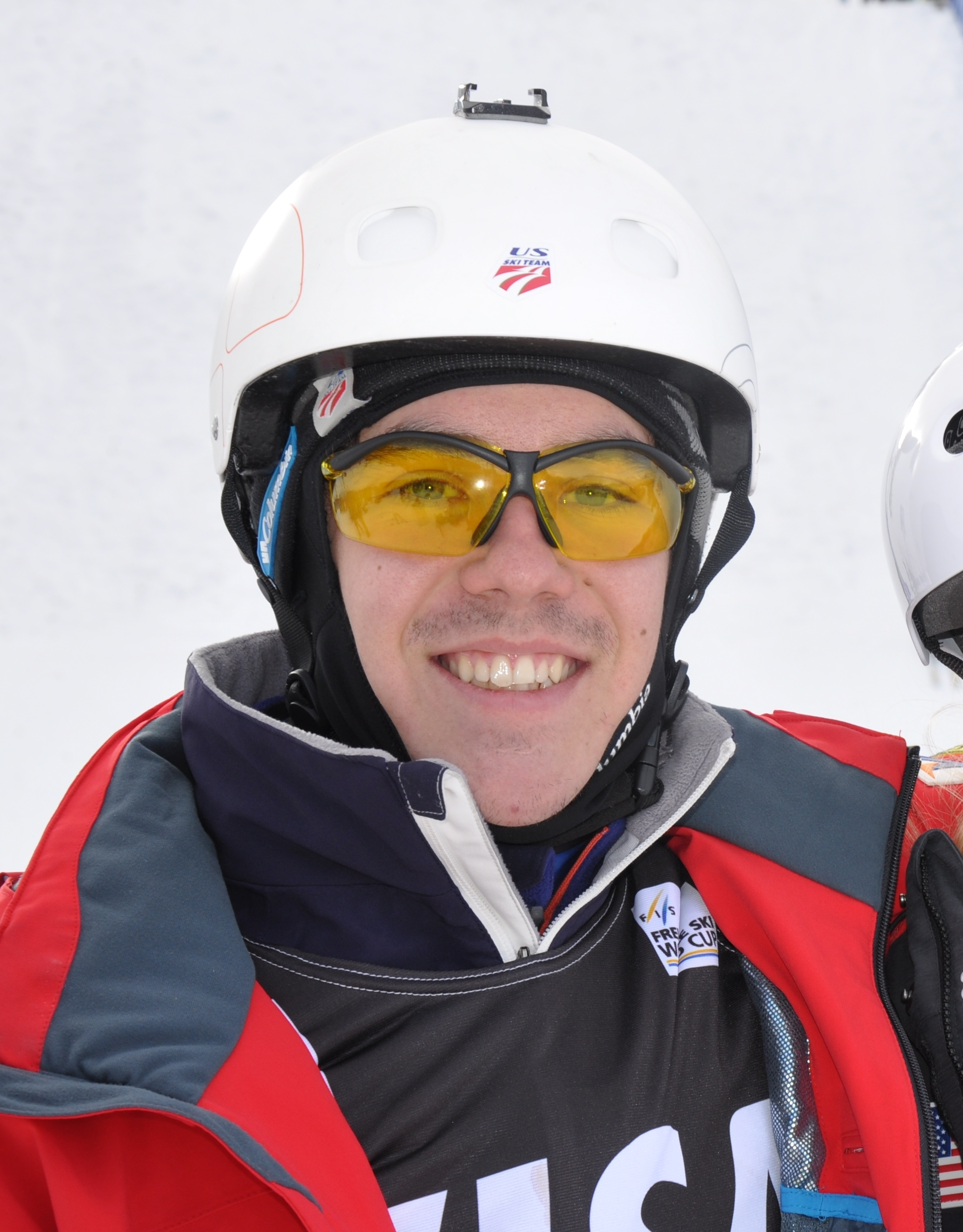

Personal information
- Born: February 25, 1994 (age 32)
- Height: 5 ft 7 in (170 cm)

Sport
- Sport: Skiing
- Club: U.S. Ski Team

World Cup career
- Indiv. podiums: 1
- Updated on November 22, 2013

Michael "Jersey Mike" Rossi (born February 25, 1994) is an American freestyle aerialist from the Long Valley section of Washington Township, Morris County, New Jersey. He has been competing in the FIS Freestyle Skiing World Cup since the 2011–2012 season. In the 2012–2013 season, he earned a bronze medal at the Deer Valley World Cup competition.
