= Design Flaws of the Human Condition =

Design Flaws of the Human Condition is a novel by Paul Schmidtberger.

== Background ==
Published by Random House in 2007, the novel is an urban comedy of adultery that is an "assuredly entertaining romp" whose characters are handled "with a sympathetic grace."

== Synopsis ==
Two strangers in New York, Iris and Ken, meet when they find themselves forced into an anger-management class. Iris is there because of a justifiable meltdown on a crowded flight, whereas Ken was caught defacing library books with rude (but very true!) messages about his former boyfriend that he caught in bed with another man.

Iris and Ken seem cosmically destined to be friends. What follows is a strikingly original comedy as Ken enlists Iris to infiltrate his ex-boyfriend's life in the hope of discovering that he's miserable.

And Iris reciprocates, dispatching Ken to gain himself into the confidence of her own boyfriend, whom she thinks is cheating. But what if Ken's ex-boyfriend isn't crying himself to sleep? What should Iris do when her worst suspicions begin to become true? Just exactly how perfect do we have the right to expect our fellow human beings to be?

The novel explores such universal themes as anger, betrayal, friendship and loyalty with wisdom, compassion, and a wickedly irreverent sense of humor.
