= Washington Township, Morris County, New Jersey =

Township in Morris County, New Jersey, US

Washington Township, New Jersey
- Township
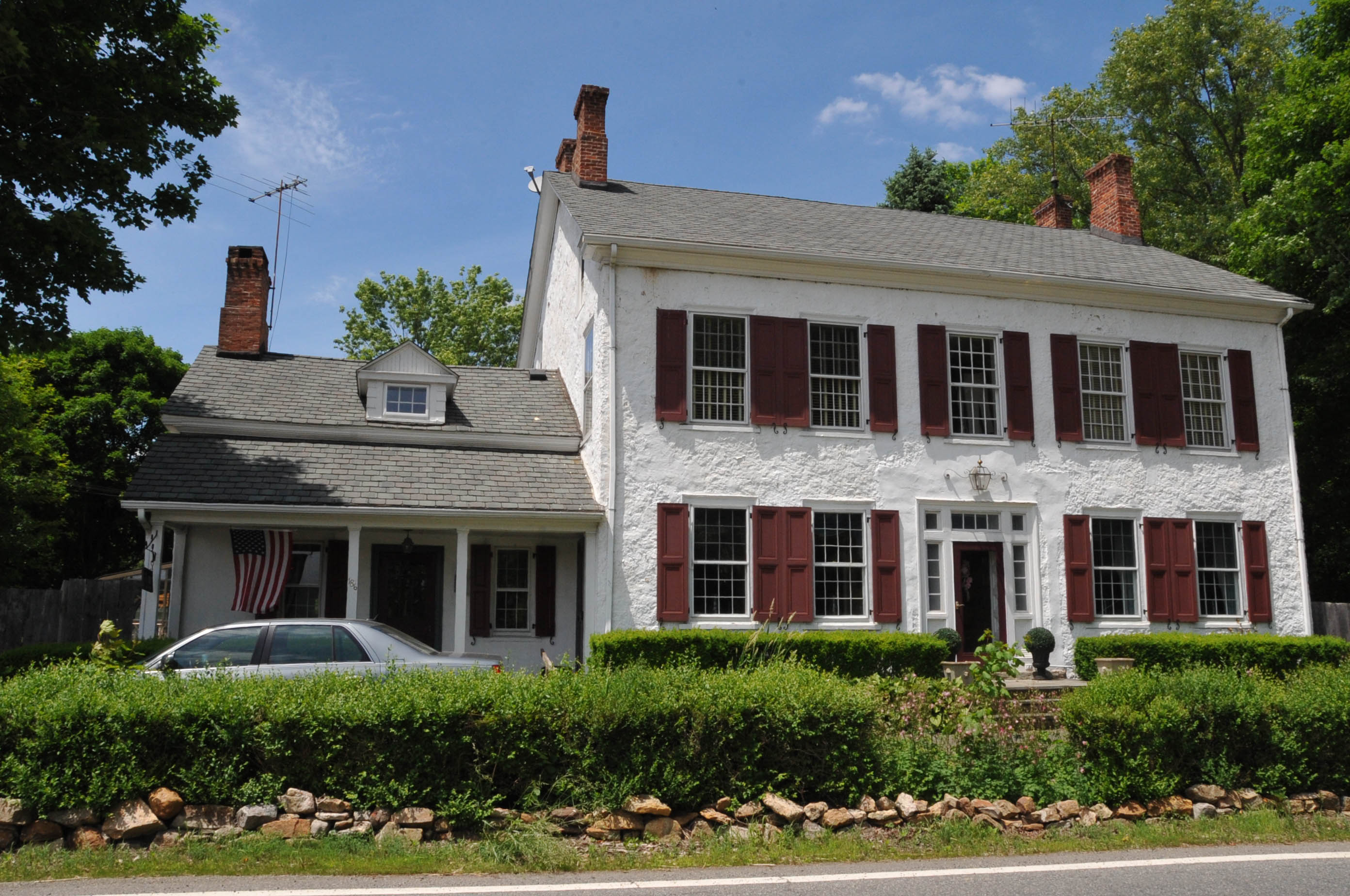
- Trimmer-Dufford Farmstead

- Seal

- Location in Morris County and the state of New Jersey.

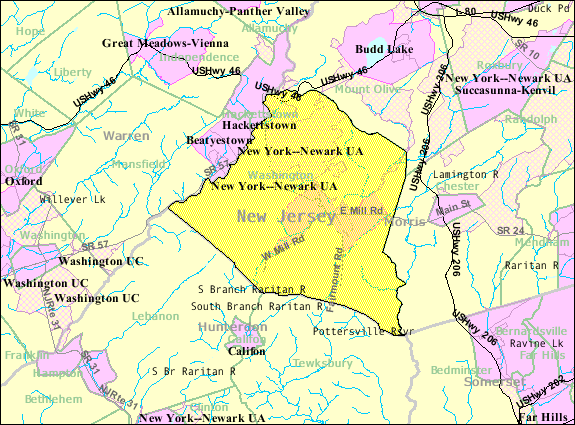
- Census Bureau map of Washington Township, Morris County, New Jersey

- Location in Morris County Location in New Jersey Location in the United States
- Coordinates: 40.784654°N 74.79769°W
- Country: United States
- State: New Jersey
- County: Morris
- Incorporated: April 2, 1798
- Named for: George Washington

Government
  - Type: Township
  - Body: Township Committee
  - Mayor: Michael Marino (R, term ends December 31, 2025)
  - Administrator: Charles Daniel
  - Township clerk: Denean Probasco

Area
  - Total: 44.90 sq mi (116.28 km^{2})
  - Land: 44.58 sq mi (115.47 km^{2})
  - Water: 0.31 sq mi (0.81 km^{2}) 0.70%
  - Rank: 42nd of 565 in state 2nd of 39 in county
- Elevation: 988 ft (301 m)

Population (2020)
  - Total: 18,197
  - Estimate (2023): 18,212
  - Rank: 149th of 565 in state 11th of 39 in county
  - Density: 408.2/sq mi (157.6/km^{2})
  - Rank: 457th of 565 in state 36th of 39 in county
- Time zone: UTC−05:00 (Eastern (EST))
  - Summer (DST): UTC−04:00 (Eastern (EDT))
- ZIP Code: 07853 – Long Valley
- Area code: 908
- FIPS code: 3402777240
- GNIS feature ID: 0882198
- Website: www.wtmorris.org

Washington Township is a township in southwestern Morris County, in the U.S. state of New Jersey. As of the 2020 United States census, the township's population was 18,197, a decrease of 336 (−1.8%) from the 2010 census count of 18,533, which in turn reflected an increase of 941 (+5.3%) from the 17,592 counted in the 2000 census.

The township is situated in the westernmost part of Morris County bordering both Hunterdon and Warren counties. It is located within the Raritan Valley region and is one of six municipalities (five of which are townships) in the state with the name "Washington". Washington Borough, located only 10 miles (16 km) away, is surrounded by another municipality that is also called Washington Township in Warren County.

The township has been ranked as one of the state's highest-income communities. Based on data from the American Community Survey (ACS) for 2014–2018, Washington Township residents had a median household income of $150,682, nearly 90% above the statewide median of $79,363. In the 2013–2017 ACS, Washington Township had a median household income of $140,445, ranking 45th in the state.

== History ==
Washington Township was incorporated as a township by the New Jersey Legislature on April 2, 1798, from portions of Roxbury Township. Portions of the township were taken to form Chester Township as of April 1, 1799. The township was named for George Washington, one of more than ten communities statewide named for the first president.

In 1798, Morris County's Washington Township became the first incorporated in New Jersey, but by 1894 there were 18 municipalities and other communities across the state named Washington or Washingtonville.

In June 1979, a 5-year-old boy was killed by a leopard that had been chained to a stake outside of a circus, during a performance sponsored by the local fire department at Flocktown Road School.

A 1983 effort to rename Washington Township to Long Valley failed in an election.

=== Murder of Rachel Domas ===
On September 12, 1985, 14-year-old Rachel Domas was sexually assaulted and murdered on Fairview Avenue by 19-year-old Michael Manfredonia while on her three-mile walk from school to her home after missing the school bus. Manfredonia, a gas station attendant who worked nearby, confessed to asking Domas out; when he was refused he pulled a knife and threatened to kill himself.

Domas told him to "stop acting childish" to which Manfredonia pushed her to the ground, sexually assaulted her and stabbed her 26 times, 15 of which were too shallow to cause significant damage and were intended to make Domas suffer. Police would find Domas's body buried in a shallow grave in the woods close to the road two days later.

Manfredonia would be turned in by his parents and was found by the police attempting to commit suicide by slicing his wrists and ingesting a high concentration of pills. Manfredonia, who had an IQ of 78 making him clinically retarded, was suffering from Intermittent explosive disorder. Manfredonia waived his right to a trial and was found guilty of murder, felony murder, aggravated sexual assault, kidnapping, and possession of a weapon for an unlawful purpose. Manfredonia would be sentenced to life in prison as well as an additional 110 years and will not be eligible for parole until 2041.

== Geography ==
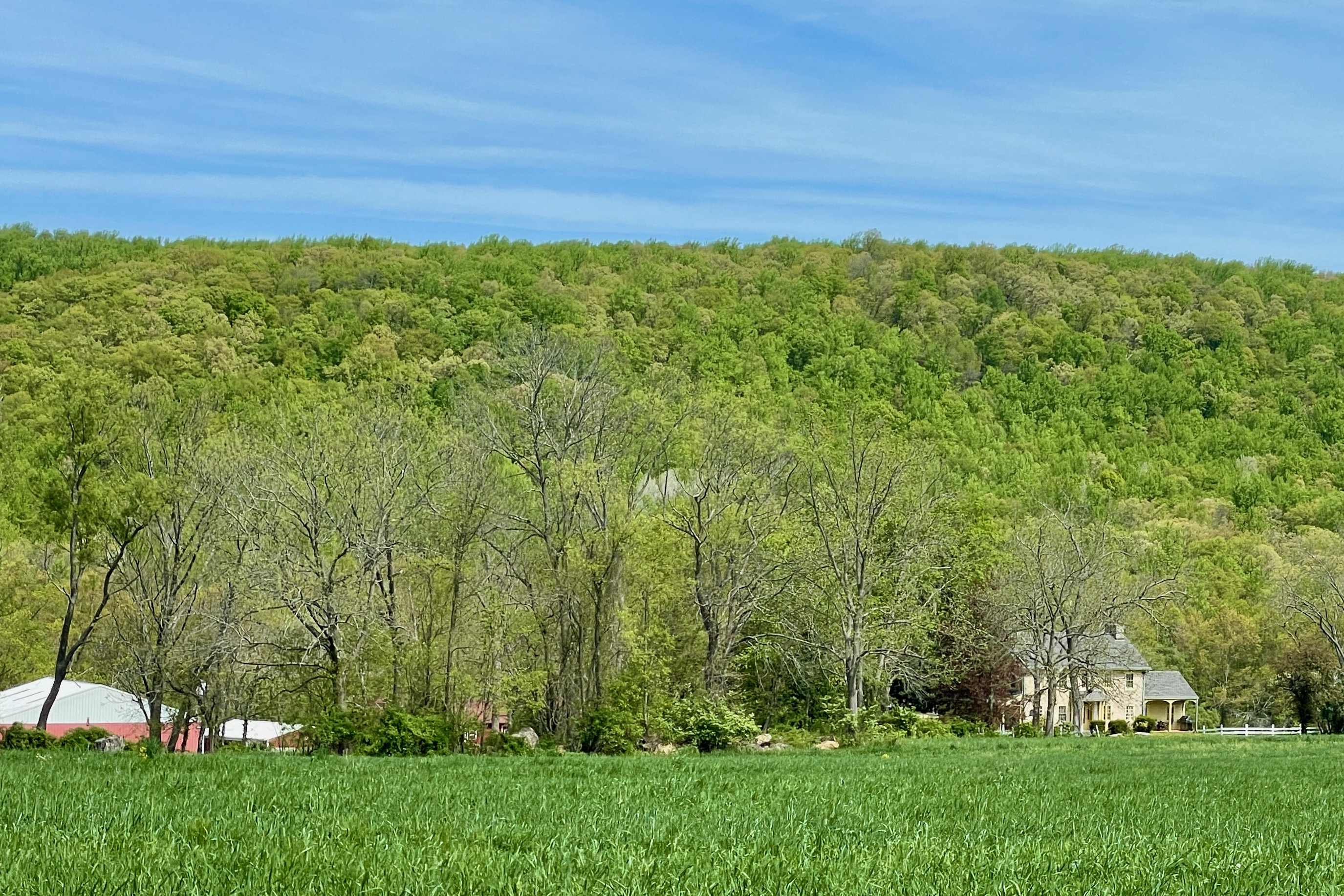
The Anthony–Corwin Farm in the valley by Schooley's Mountain

According to the United States Census Bureau, the township had a total area of 44.771 square miles (115.957 km^{2}), including 44.387 square miles (114.963 km^{2}) of land and 0.384 square miles (0.994 km^{2}) of water (0.86%).

Long Valley (2020 population of 1,827) is an unincorporated community and census-designated place (CDP) located within Washington Township. The Long Valley section—the heart of the township—was called German Valley when it was first settled in the 18th century by people from Saxony, in Germany, until its name was changed around 1917 in the wake of anti-German sentiment following World War I.

Other unincorporated communities, localities and place names located partially or completely within the township include Bartley, Beattystown, Crestmoore, Drakestown, Fairmount, Four Bridges, German Valley, Lake George, Middle Valley, Naughright, Parker, Pleasant Grove, Pottersville, Scrappy Corner, Springtown and Stephensburg.

Schooley's Mountain is an unincorporated community in Washington Township named for the Schooley family, who owned a considerable amount of land there during the 1790s. The natural springs in the area helped attract visitors to the Schooley's Mountain section in the 1800s.

Neighboring municipalities include Morris County communities Chester Township to the east, Mount Olive to the north, Hunterdon County communities Tewksbury Township to the south and Lebanon Township to the southwest as well as Warren County communities Mansfield Township to the west and Hackettstown to the northwest. Also in Somerset County in the extreme southeast corner of the town there is a border with Bedminster Township.

== Demographics ==
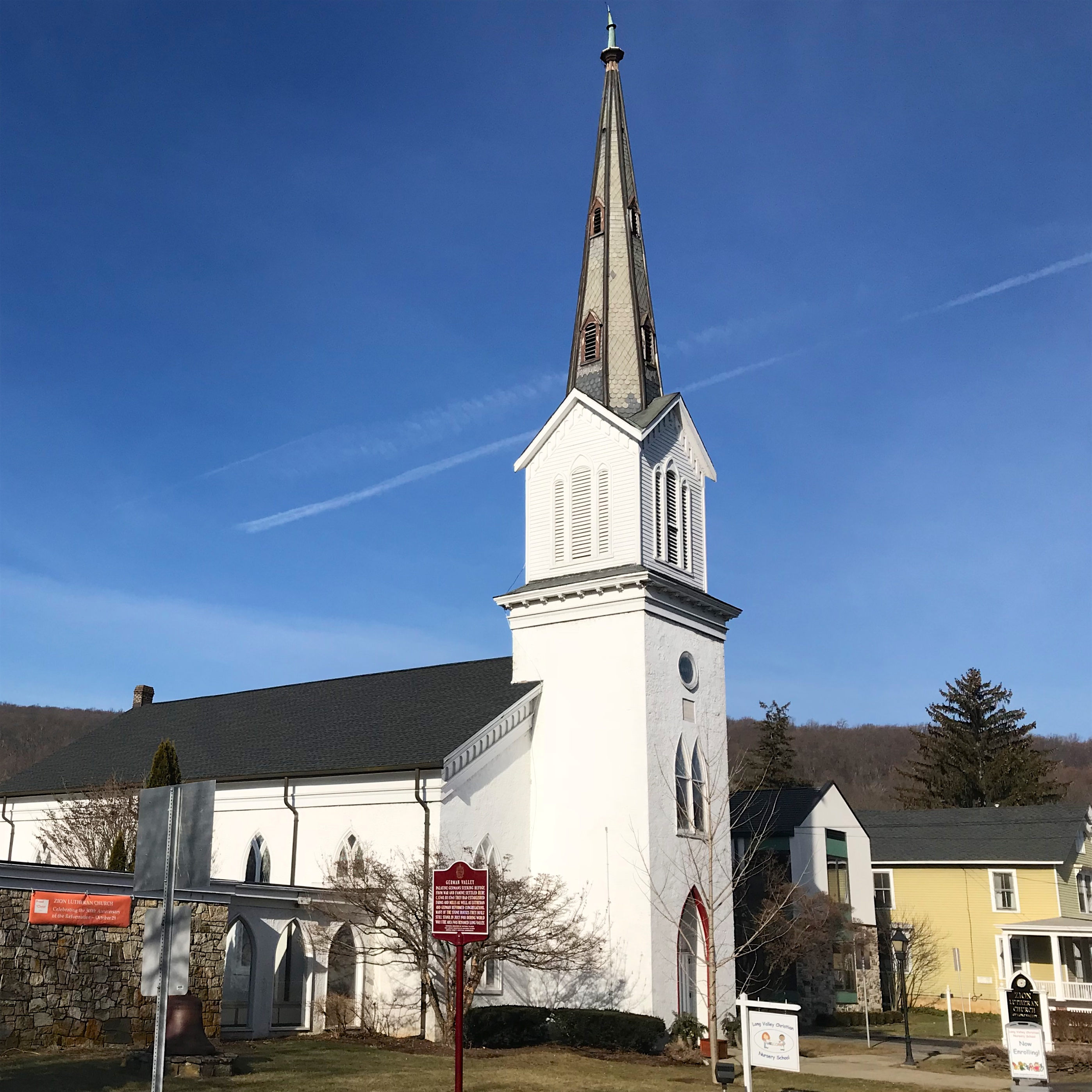
The Zion Lutheran Church in Long Valley located near the intersection of Route 513 and Route 517.

Historical population
| Census | Pop. | Note | %± |
|---|---|---|---|
| 1810 | 1,793 | | — |
| 1820 | 1,876 | | 4.6% |
| 1830 | 2,188 | | 16.6% |
| 1840 | 2,451 | | 12.0% |
| 1850 | 2,502 | | 2.1% |
| 1860 | 2,504 | | 0.1% |
| 1870 | 2,484 | | −0.8% |
| 1880 | 2,681 | | 7.9% |
| 1890 | 2,367 | | −11.7% |
| 1900 | 2,220 | | −6.2% |
| 1910 | 1,900 | | −14.4% |
| 1920 | 1,779 | | −6.4% |
| 1930 | 1,615 | | −9.2% |
| 1940 | 1,870 | | 15.8% |
| 1950 | 2,147 | | 14.8% |
| 1960 | 3,330 | | 55.1% |
| 1970 | 6,962 | | 109.1% |
| 1980 | 11,402 | | 63.8% |
| 1990 | 15,592 | | 36.7% |
| 2000 | 17,592 | | 12.8% |
| 2010 | 18,533 | | 5.3% |
| 2020 | 18,197 | | −1.8% |
| 2023 (est.) | 18,212 | | 0.1% |
Population sources: 1810–1920 1840 1850–1870; 1850 1870 1880–1890; 1890–1910 1910–1930; 1940–2000 2000; 2010 2020

=== 2010 census ===
The 2010 United States census counted 18,533 people, 6,237 households, and 5,195 families in the township. The population density was 417.5 per square mile (161.2/km^{2}). There were 6,488 housing units at an average density of 146.2 per square mile (56.4/km^{2}). The racial makeup was 93.06% (17,247) White, 1.39% (257) Black or African American, 0.06% (11) Native American, 3.30% (612) Asian, 0.01% (2) Pacific Islander, 0.69% (127) from other races, and 1.49% (277) from two or more races. Hispanic or Latino of any race were 4.57% (847) of the population.

Of the 6,237 households, 43.4% had children under the age of 18; 73.7% were married couples living together; 6.8% had a female householder with no husband present and 16.7% were non-families. Of all households, 13.9% were made up of individuals and 6.3% had someone living alone who was 65 years of age or older. The average household size was 2.95 and the average family size was 3.27.

28.7% of the population were under the age of 18, 5.8% from 18 to 24, 19.6% from 25 to 44, 34.5% from 45 to 64, and 11.4% who were 65 years of age or older. The median age was 43.0 years. For every 100 females, the population had 96.1 males. For every 100 females ages 18 and older there were 93.3 males.

The Census Bureau's 2006–2010 American Community Survey showed that (in 2010 inflation-adjusted dollars) median household income was $112,651 (with a margin of error of ± $7,207) and the median family income was $124,818 (± $8,669). Males had a median income of $92,019 (± $5,016) versus $66,302 (± $11,089) for females. The per capita income for the borough was $49,154 (± $2,492). About 0.1% of families and 0.9% of the population were below the poverty line, including 0.2% of those under age 18 and 4.8% of those age 65 or over.

=== 2000 census ===
As of the 2000 United States census there were 17,592 people, 5,755 households, and 4,874 families residing in the township. The population density was 392.1 inhabitants per square mile (151.4/km^{2}). There were 5,890 housing units at an average density of 131.3 per square mile (50.7/km^{2}). The racial makeup of the township was 96.16% White, 0.83% African American, 0.09% Native American, 1.87% Asian, 0.05% Pacific Islander, 0.35% from other races, and 0.65% from two or more races. Hispanic or Latino of any race were 2.21% of the population.

There were 5,755 households, out of which 47.0% had children under the age of 18 living with them, 76.1% were married couples living together, 6.3% had a female householder with no husband present, and 15.3% were non-families. 12.2% of all households were made up of individuals, and 5.4% had someone living alone who was 65 years of age or older. The average household size was 3.02 and the average family size was 3.31.

In the township the population was spread out, with 30.2% under the age of 18, 5.3% from 18 to 24, 28.2% from 25 to 44, 28.1% from 45 to 64, and 8.2% who were 65 years of age or older. The median age was 38 years. For every 100 females, there were 95.5 males. For every 100 females age 18 and over, there were 93.5 males.

The median income for a household in the township was $97,763, and the median income for a family was $104,926. Males had a median income of $76,791 versus $41,759 for females. The per capita income for the township was $37,489. About 1.8% of families and 2.3% of the population were below the poverty line, including 2.0% of those under age 18 and 4.0% of those age 65 or over.

== Government ==
=== Local government ===
Washington Township is governed under the Township form of New Jersey municipal government, one of 141 municipalities (of the 564) statewide that use this form, the second-most commonly used form of government in the state. The Township Committee is comprised of five members, who are elected directly by the voters at-large in partisan elections to serve three-year terms of office on a staggered basis, with either one or two seats coming up for election each year as part of the November general election in a three-year cycle. At an annual reorganization meeting, the Township Committee selects one of its members to serve as Mayor and another as Vice Mayor.

As of 2025, the members of the Washington Township Committee are Mayor Michael Marino (R, term on committee and as mayor ends December 31, 2025), Vice Mayor Matthew Murrello (R, term on committee ends 2026; term as vice mayor ends 2025), Walter Curioni (R, 2027), Kenneth W. "Bill" Roehrich (R, 2027) and Richard Wall (R, 2025).

In June 2022, the Township Committee appointed Michael Marino to fill the seat expiring in December 2022 that had been held by Tyler Oborn until he resigned from office as he was moving out of state.

In September 2021, committeeman Greg Forsbrey, who was originally elected as a Republican in 2016, and subsequently re-elected in 2019, left the party and became an independent. He cited the election of two people who lost their party committee seats in the previous primary to be the chair and vice chair of the local Republican Committee, saying that this ignored the results of the primary and through it the will of the voters.

The 2013 property tax rate for Washington Township was $2.328 per $100 of assessed value, with an equalization ratio of 97.57%.

=== Federal, state and county representation ===
Washington Township is located in the 7th Congressional District and is part of New Jersey's 24th state legislative district.

For the 119th United States Congress, New Jersey's 7th congressional district is represented by Thomas Kean Jr. (R, Westfield). New Jersey is represented in the United States Senate by Democrats Cory Booker (Newark, term ends 2027) and Andy Kim (Moorestown, term ends 2031).

For the 2026–2027 session, the 24th legislative district of the New Jersey Legislature is represented in the State Senate by Parker Space (R, Wantage Township) and in the General Assembly by Dawn Fantasia (R, Franklin) and Mike Inganamort (R, Chester Township).

Morris County is governed by a Board of County Commissioners comprised of seven members who are elected at-large in partisan elections to three-year terms on a staggered basis, with either one or three seats up for election each year as part of the November general election. Actual day-to-day operation of departments is supervised by County Administrator Deena Leary.

As of 2026, Morris County's Commissioners (with all terms ending December 31) are Director Stephen H. Shaw (R, Mountain Lakes, 2027), Deputy Director John Krickus (R, Washington Township, 2027), Douglas Cabana (R, Boonton Township, 2028), Thomas J. Mastrangelo (R, Montville, 2028), Christine Myers (R, Harding Township, 2028), Tayfun Selen (R, Chatham Township, 2026), and Deborah Smith (R, Denville Township, 2027).

The county's constitutional officers are County Clerk Ann F. Grossi (R, Parsippany–Troy Hills, 2028), Sheriff James M. Gannon (R, Boonton Township, 2025) and Surrogate Heather Darling (R, Roxbury, 2029).

=== Politics ===
United States presidential election results for Washington Township 2024 2020 2016 2012 2008 2004
| Year | Republican | | Democratic | | Third party(ies) | |
| Year | No. | % | No. | % | No. | % |
|---|---|---|---|---|---|---|
| 2024 | 6,408 | 55.41% | 4,981 | 43.07% | 176 | 1.52% |
| 2020 | 6,502 | 52.95% | 5,578 | 45.42% | 200 | 1.63% |
| 2016 | 6,067 | 58.57% | 3,872 | 37.38% | 420 | 4.05% |
| 2012 | 6,021 | 64.01% | 3,278 | 34.85% | 107 | 1.14% |
| 2008 | 6,323 | 61.36% | 3,887 | 37.72% | 94 | 0.91% |
| 2004 | 6,402 | 64.94% | 3,377 | 34.26% | 79 | 0.80% |

As of March 2011, there were a total of 12,709 registered voters in Washington Township, of which 1,999 (15.7%) were registered as Democrats, 5,295 (41.7%) were registered as Republicans and 5,401 (42.5%) were registered as Unaffiliated. There were 14 voters registered as Libertarians or Greens.

In the 2012 presidential election, Republican Mitt Romney received 64.0% of the vote (6,021 cast), ahead of Democrat Barack Obama with 34.9% (3,278 votes), and 3rd party candidates with 1.1% (107 votes), among the 9,451 ballots cast by the township's 13,373 registered voters (45 ballots were spoiled), for a turnout of 70.7%.

In the 2008 presidential election, Republican John McCain received 61.1% of the vote (6,323 cast), ahead of Democrat Barack Obama with 37.6% (3,887 votes) and 3rd party candidates with 0.9% (94 votes), among the 10,342 ballots cast by the township's 13,315 registered voters, for a turnout of 77.7%.

In the 2004 presidential election, Republican George W. Bush received 64.7% of the vote (6,402 ballots cast), beating Democrat John Kerry's 34.1% (3,377 votes) and 3rd party candidates with 0.6% (79 votes), among the 9,894 ballots cast by the township's 13,048 registered voters, for a turnout percentage of 75.8.

Gubernatorial election results for Washington Township
| Year | Republican | | Democratic | | Third party(ies) | |
| Year | No. | % | No. | % | No. | % |
|---|---|---|---|---|---|---|
| 2025 | 5,110 | 55.48% | 4,070 | 44.19% | 30 | 0.33% |
| 2021 | 4,951 | 62.01% | 2,967 | 37.16% | 66 | 0.83% |
| 2017 | 3,805 | 61.69% | 2,269 | 36.79% | 94 | 1.52% |
| 2013 | 4,467 | 75.49% | 1,330 | 22.48% | 120 | 2.03% |
| 2009 | 5,076 | 69.39% | 1,582 | 21.63% | 657 | 8.98% |
| 2005 | 4,241 | 67.53% | 1,832 | 29.17% | 207 | 3.30% |

In the 2013 gubernatorial election, Republican Chris Christie received 75.5% of the vote (4,467 cast), ahead of Democrat Barbara Buono with 22.5% (1,330 votes), and 3rd party candidates with 2.0% (120 votes), among the 5,981 ballots cast by the township's 13,294 registered voters (64 ballots were spoiled), for a turnout of 45.0%.

In the 2009 gubernatorial election, Republican Chris Christie received 69.1% of the vote (5,076 ballots cast), ahead of Democrat Jon Corzine with 21.5% (1,582 votes), Independent Chris Daggett with 8.4% (618 votes) and 3rd party candidates with 0.5% (39 votes), among the 7,348 ballots cast by the township's 13,037 registered voters, yielding a 56.4% turnout.

United States Senate election results for Washington Township1
| Year | Republican | | Democratic | | Third party(ies) | |
| Year | No. | % | No. | % | No. | % |
|---|---|---|---|---|---|---|
| 2024 | 6,168 | 56.10% | 4,659 | 42.38% | 167 | 1.52% |
| 2018 | 5,424 | 61.57% | 3,173 | 36.02% | 212 | 2.41% |
| 2012 | 5,664 | 64.32% | 3,039 | 34.51% | 103 | 1.17% |
| 2006 | 3,962 | 64.91% | 2,014 | 32.99% | 128 | 2.10% |

United States Senate election results for Washington Township2
| Year | Republican | | Democratic | | Third party(ies) | |
| Year | No. | % | No. | % | No. | % |
|---|---|---|---|---|---|---|
| 2020 | 6,723 | 55.95% | 5,072 | 42.21% | 222 | 1.85% |
| 2014 | 3,162 | 62.61% | 1,777 | 35.19% | 111 | 2.20% |
| 2013 | 2,788 | 64.46% | 1,505 | 34.80% | 32 | 0.74% |
| 2008 | 6,324 | 66.56% | 2,988 | 31.45% | 189 | 1.99% |

== Education ==
The Washington Township Schools is a public school district that serves students in pre-kindergarten through eighth grade. As of the 2020–21 school year, the district, comprised of four schools, had an enrollment of 1,938 students and 196.9 classroom teachers (on an FTE basis), for a student–teacher ratio of 9.8:1. Schools in the district (with 2020–21 enrollment data from the National Center for Education Statistics) are Benedict A. Cucinella Elementary School with 451 students in grades PreK-5, Flocktown-Kossmann School with 442 students in grades PreK-5, Old Farmers Road School with 310 students in grades K-5 and Long Valley Middle School with 720 students in grades 6–8.

Students in public school for ninth through twelfth grades attend West Morris Central High School, which is located in the township, but has a Chester mailing address. The school is part of the West Morris Regional High School District, which also serves students from the surrounding Morris County school districts of Chester Borough, Chester Township, Mendham Borough, Mendham Township. of the 2020–21 school year, the high school had an enrollment of 1,098 students and 94.5 classroom teachers (on an FTE basis), for a student–teacher ratio of 11.6:1. The high school district's board of education is comprised of nine members who are elected directly by voters to serve three-year terms of office on a staggered basis. The nine seats on the board of education are allocated based on the populations of the constituent municipalities, with four seats assigned to Washington Township.

== Transportation ==
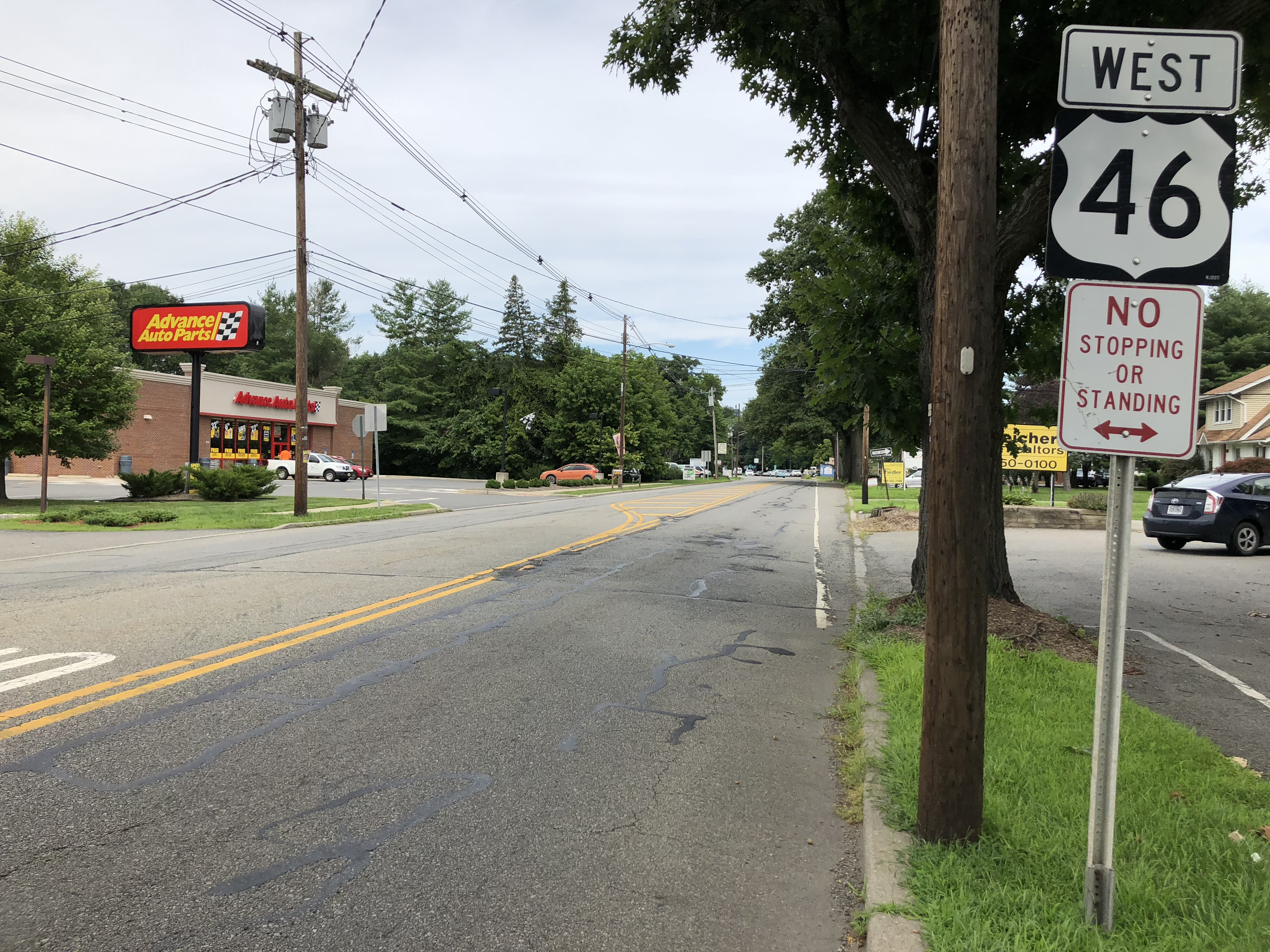
U.S. Route 46 westbound in Washington Township

=== Roads and highways ===
The township had a total of 149.44 miles (240.50 km) of roadways, of which 129.99 miles (209.20 km) were maintained by the municipality, 18.25 miles (29.37 km) by Morris County and 1.20 miles (1.93 km) by the New Jersey Department of Transportation.

U.S. Route 46, County Route 513, and County Route 517 pass through the township. The nearest limited-access roads are Interstate 80 in neighboring Mount Olive and Interstate 78 in neighboring Tewksbury Township. U.S. Route 206 is accessible in nearby Bedminster and Chester townships.

=== Public transportation ===
NJ Transit offered local bus service on the MCM5 route, which was terminated in 2010 as part of budget cuts.

== Local media ==
Radio station WRNJ has studios, offices and its transmitter in Washington Township, broadcasting at 1510 AM and several FM stations in neighboring towns. The station is licensed to nearby Hackettstown.

The township's official newspaper is the Daily Record. The Observer-Tribune is a weekly newspaper that serves Washington Township and a few surrounding communities in western Morris County.

== Notable people ==
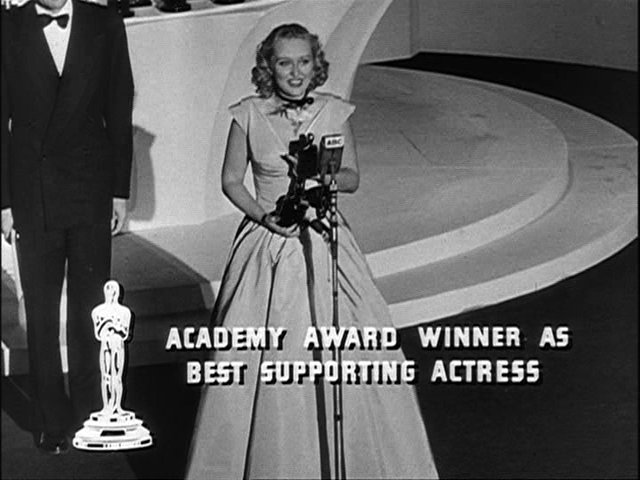
Celeste Holm

People who were born in, residents of, or otherwise closely associated with Washington Township include:

- Wesley Addy (1913–1996), actor
- Walt Ader (1913–1982), race car driver who placed 22nd at the 1950 Indianapolis 500
- Jack Borgenicht (1911–2005), mountain climber, entrepreneur, preservationist and philanthropist
- Michael Burton (born 1992), football fullback for the Denver Broncos of the National Football League
- Dolan Twins (born 1999), comedy duo
- Guy R. Gregg (born 1949), politician who served in the New Jersey General Assembly from 1992 to 2008, where he represented the 24th Legislative District
- Celeste Holm (1917–2012), Oscar-winning actress
- Jacob W. Miller (1800–1862), politician who represented New Jersey in the United States Senate
- Henry Muhlenberg (1711–1787), founder of Lutheranism in America, who established a congregation in German Valley, which met at the Old Stone Church
- Tyler Muszelik (born 2004), professional ice hockey goaltender for the Charlotte Checkers of the American Hockey League
- Ida C. Nahm (1865–1922), physician and clubwoman
- Andrew Politi (born 1996), professional baseball pitcher
- Mike Rossi (born 1994), freestyle aerialist
- Paul Schmidtberger, novelist, whose works include Design Flaws of the Human Condition
- Shannon Sohn (born 1974), television news reporter at WABC-TV Eyewitness News in New York City, where she became the first helicopter reporter to win a national Emmy Award
- Bill Stepien (born 1978), former Deputy Chief of Staff for Governor Chris Christie and former campaign manager for the Donald Trump 2020 presidential campaign
- Lisa Unger (born 1970), author of contemporary fiction
- Diana West (born 1965), lactation consultant and author specializing on the topic of breastfeeding
- Charles Wuorinen (1938–2020), Pulitzer Prize-winning composer of contemporary classical music
