= German Valley Historic District =

Historic district in New Jersey, United States

- U.S. National Register of Historic Places
- U.S. Historic district
- New Jersey Register of Historic Places
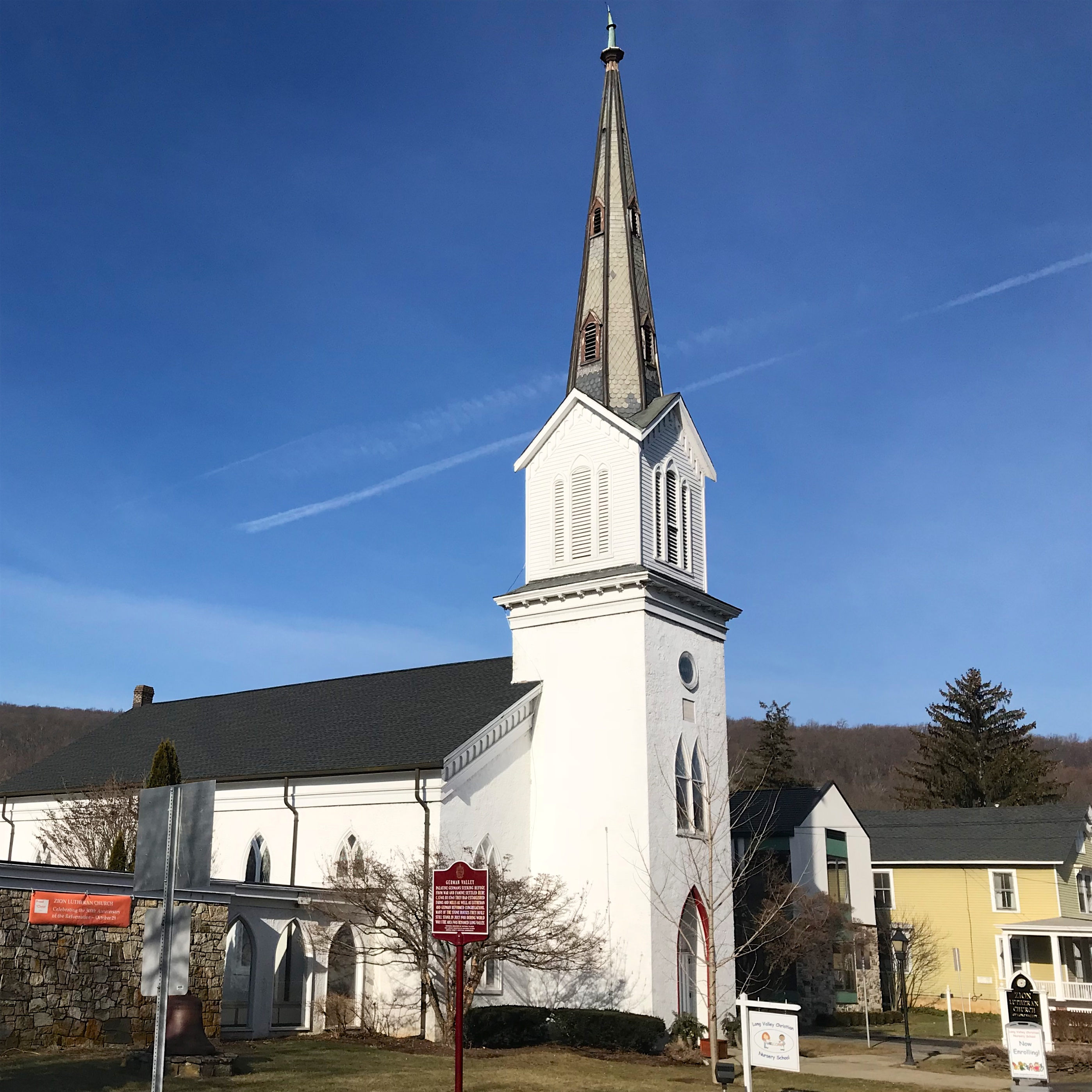
- Zion Lutheran Church, 2018

- Location within Morris County, New Jersey Location within New Jersey Location within the United States
- Location: NJ 24, Fairmount and Fairview Roads; Long Valley, New Jersey
- Coordinates: 40°47′05″N 74°46′48″W
- Area: 69 acres (28 ha)
- Architectural style: Greek Revival, Federal, Late Victoria
- NRHP reference No.: 83001606
- NJRHP No.: 2260

Significant dates
- Added to NRHP: July 14, 1983
- Designated NJRHP: December 19, 1977

The German Valley Historic District is a 69-acre (28 ha) historic district located in the Long Valley section of Washington Township in Morris County, New Jersey. The district was added to the National Register of Historic Places on July 14, 1983, for its significance in agriculture, education, transportation, industry, and religion.

== History and description ==
The congregation of the Zion Lutheran Church was chartered in 1760, the current Gothic church built in 1832, and the bell tower added in 1861. The German Valley Hotel was built in the mid 19th century. The Old Stone Union Church was built in 1774 from fieldstone and is surrounded by a cemetery. The Lutheran clergyman and missionary, Henry Muhlenberg, often preached here. The German Valley School was built in 1830 from fieldstone. Located next to the Old Union Church, it is now Washington Township Historical Society Museum. The Obadiah LaTourette Grist and Saw Mill on the South Branch Raritan River was built around 1750 and owned by Phillip Weise. In the 1870s, it was converted to turbine power by owner Obadiah LaTourette. The Phillip J. Weisse / J. Schoenheit Farm, known as the Old Fort, is said to have been built around 1774, and was rebuilt in 1876 with Victorian style. The two and one-half story stone Phillip Weise House was built around 1800.

== Gallery of contributing properties ==
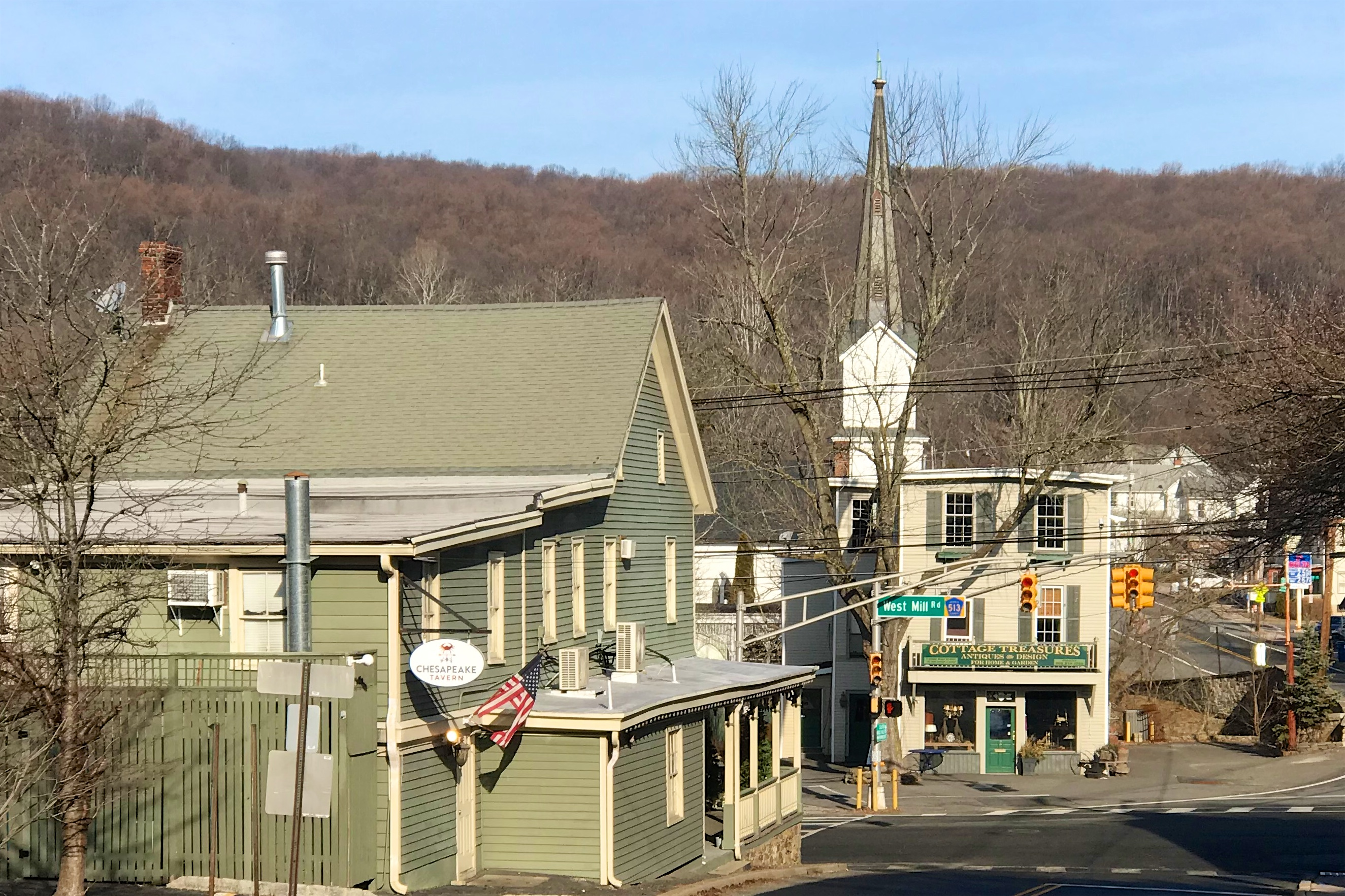
German Valley Hotel and Zion Lutheran Church

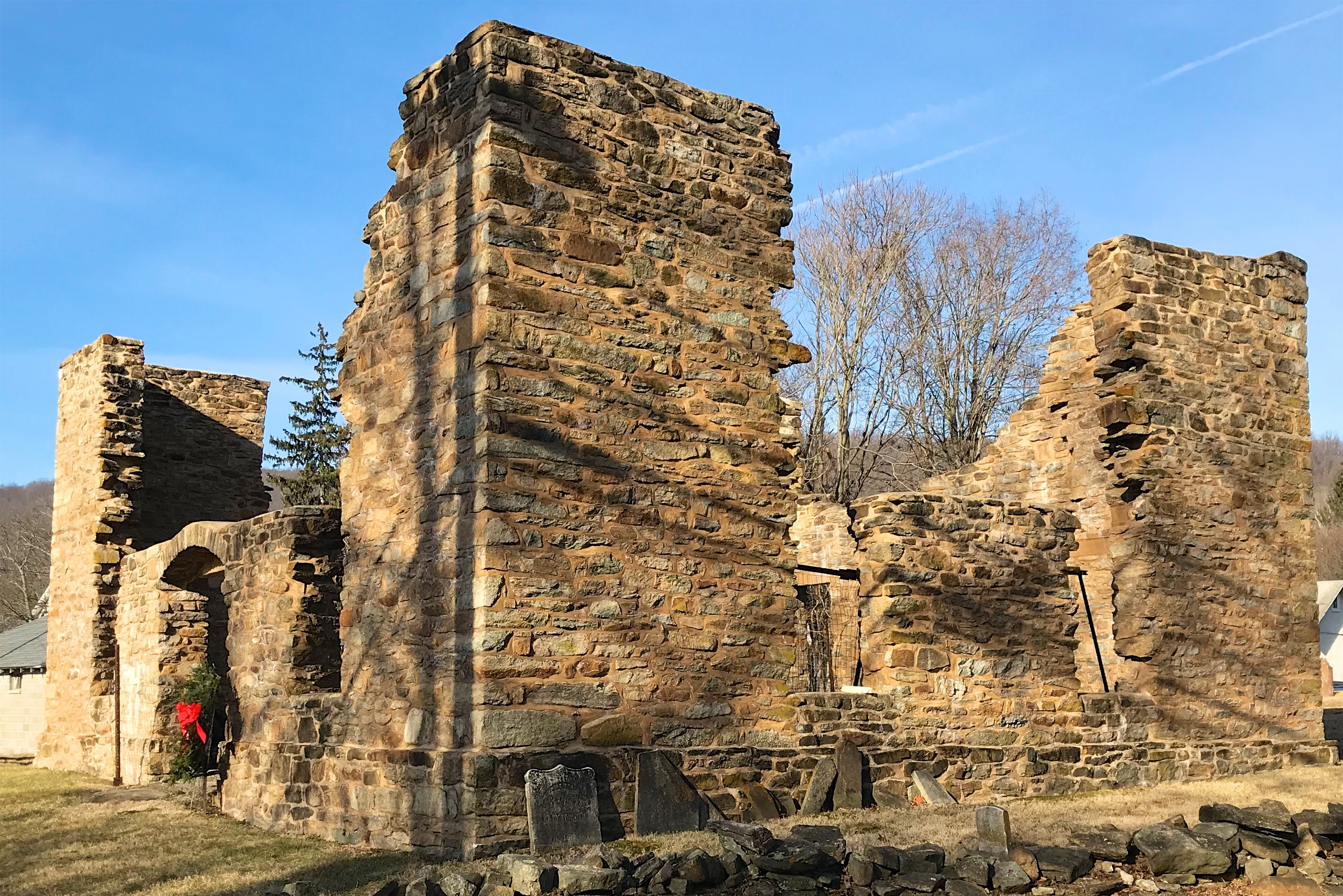
Old Stone Union Church ruins, built 1774

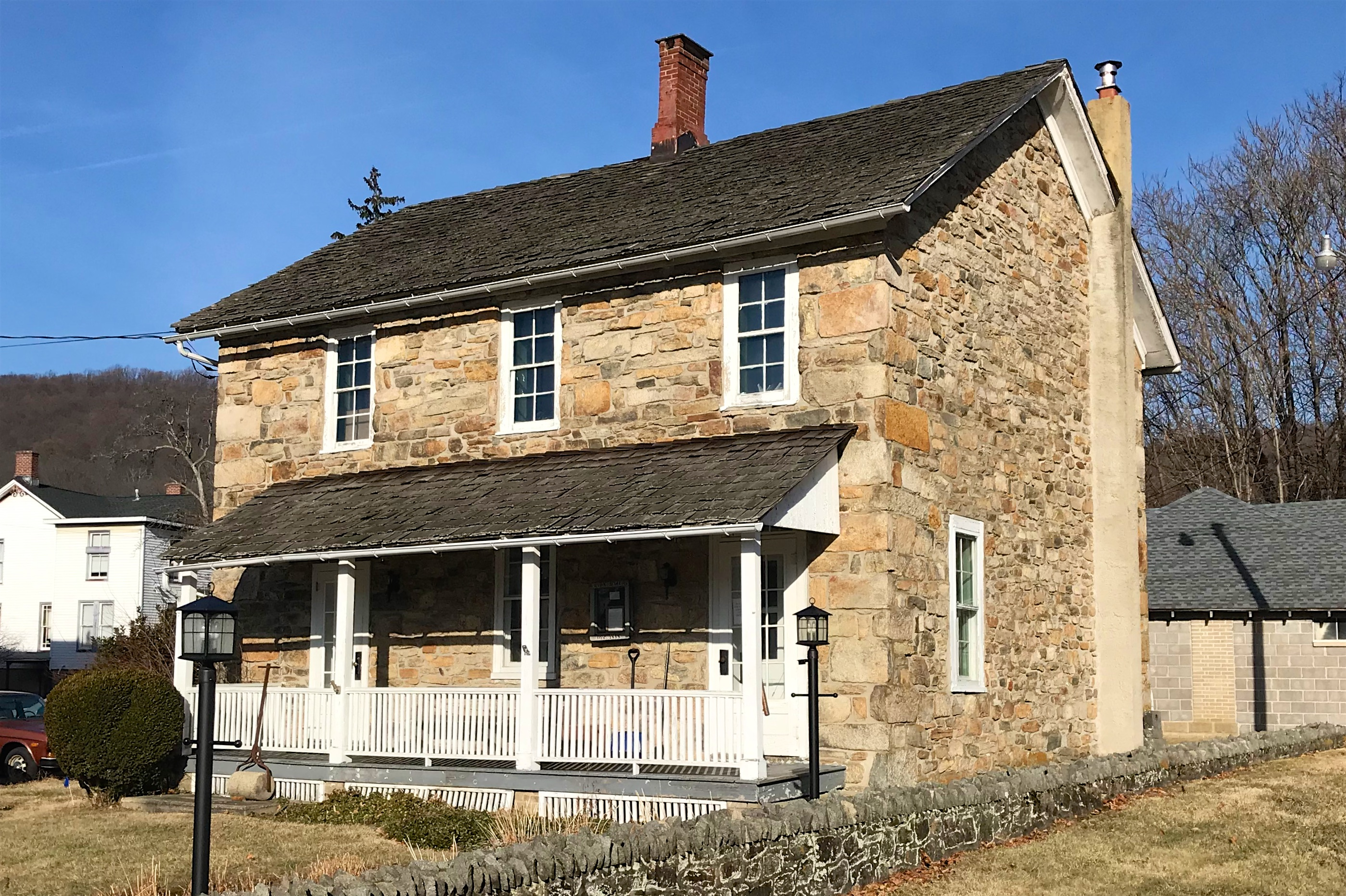
Former German Valley School, built 1830

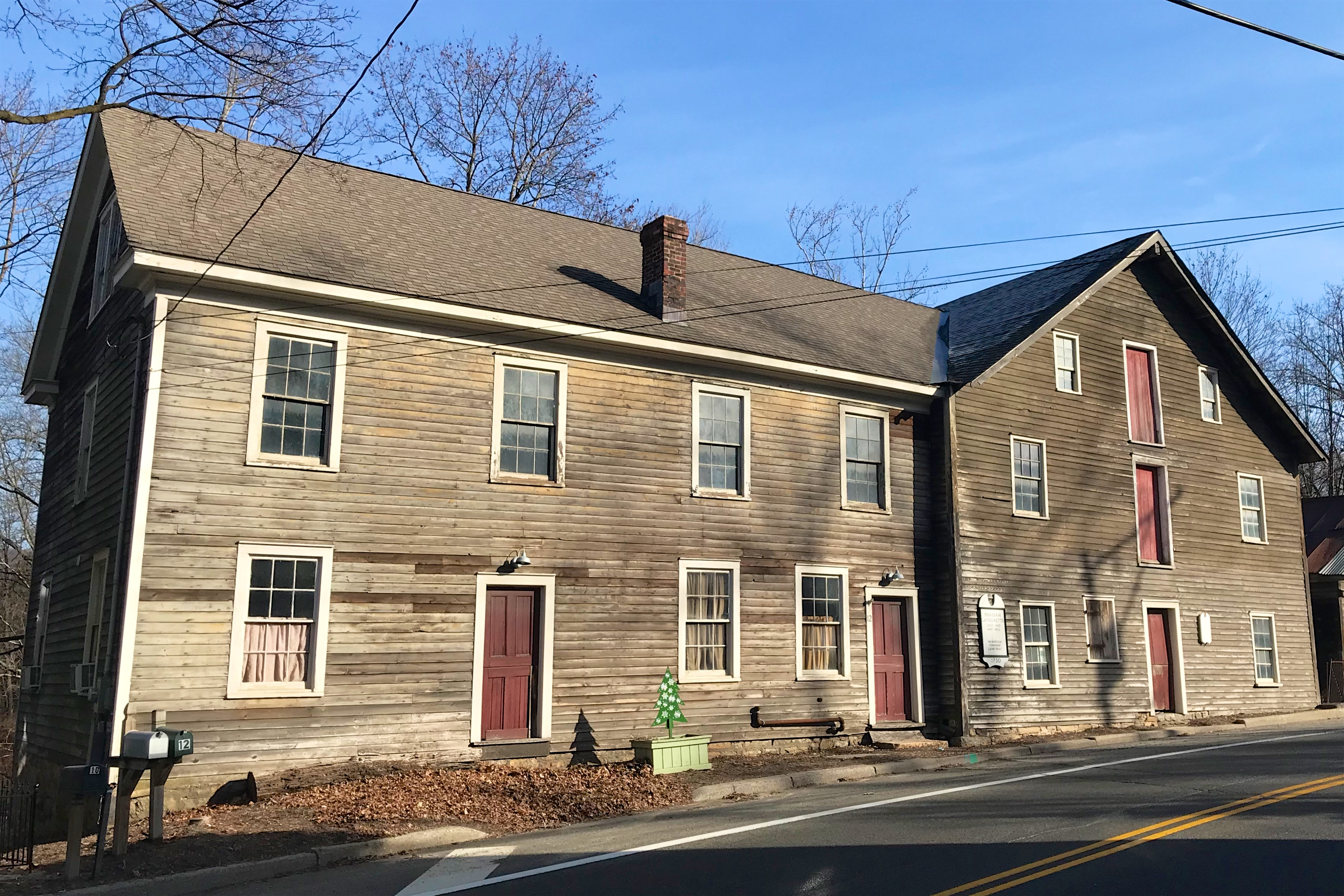
Obadiah LaTourette Grist and Saw Mill, built c. 1750

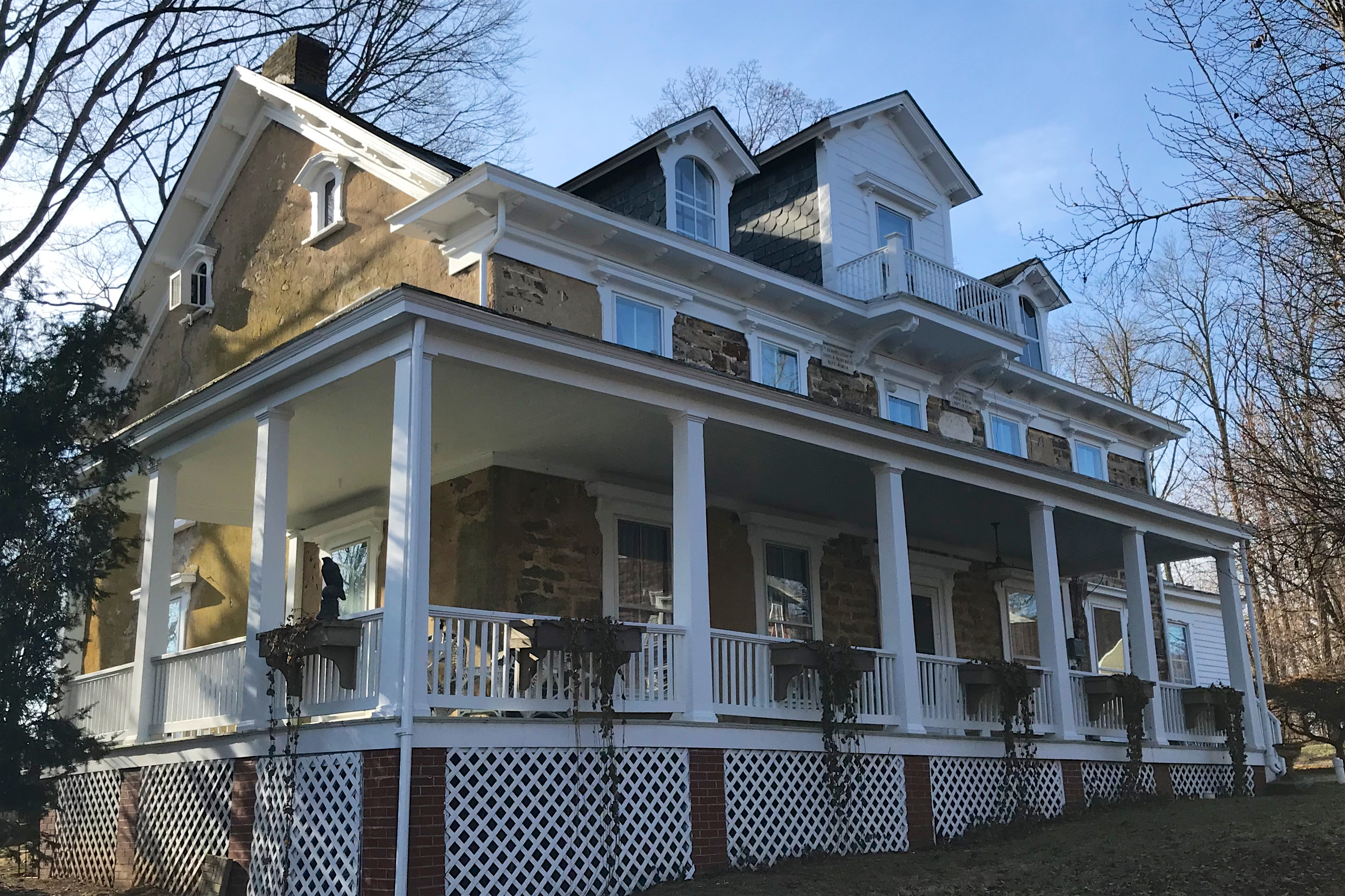
The "Old Fort", Phillip J. Weisse / J. Schoenheit Farm, built c. 1774

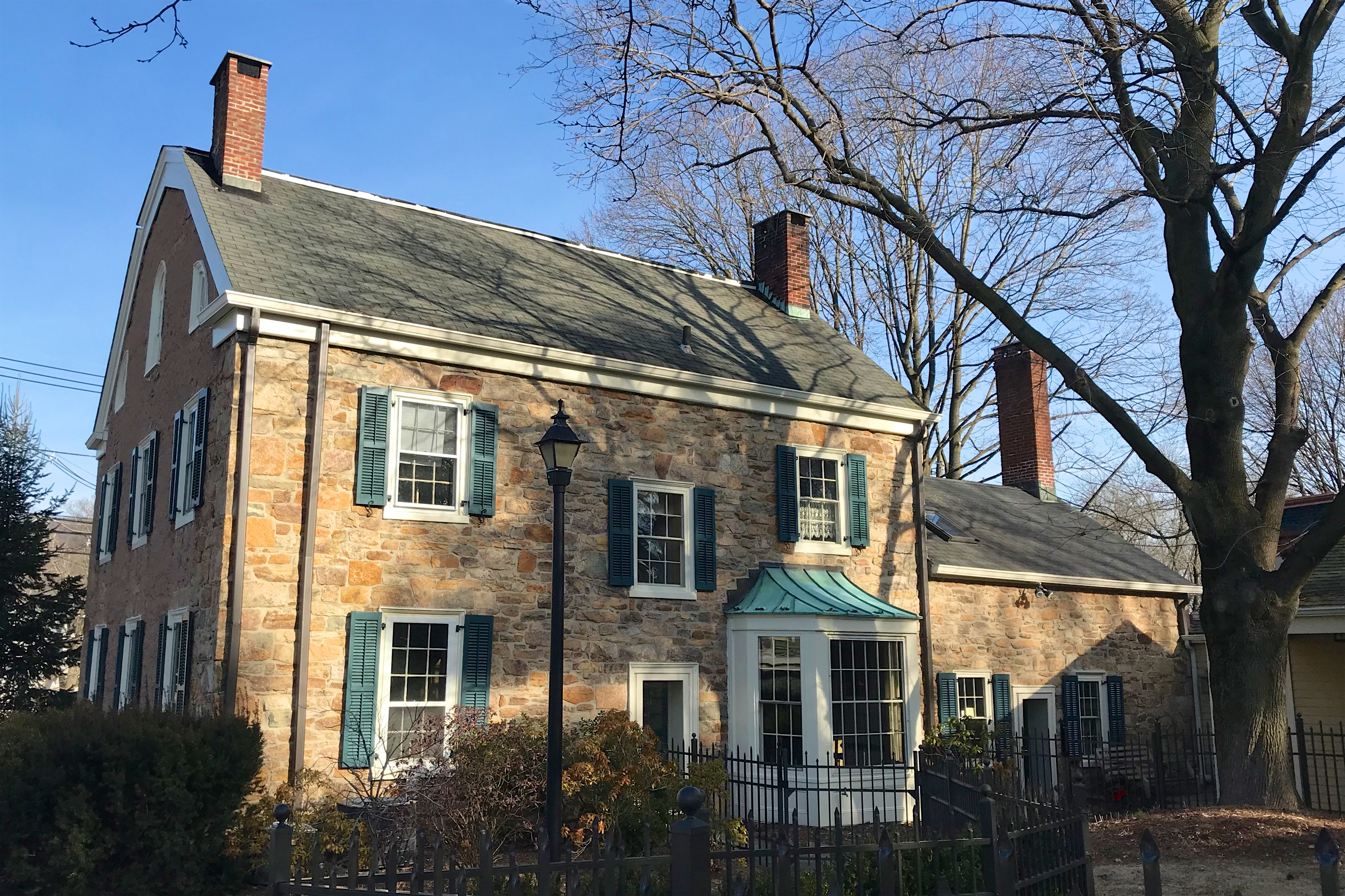
Phillip Weise House, built c. 1800

== See also ==
- National Register of Historic Places listings in Morris County, New Jersey
