= Long Valley, New Jersey =

Place in Morris County, New Jersey, United States

- Census-designated place
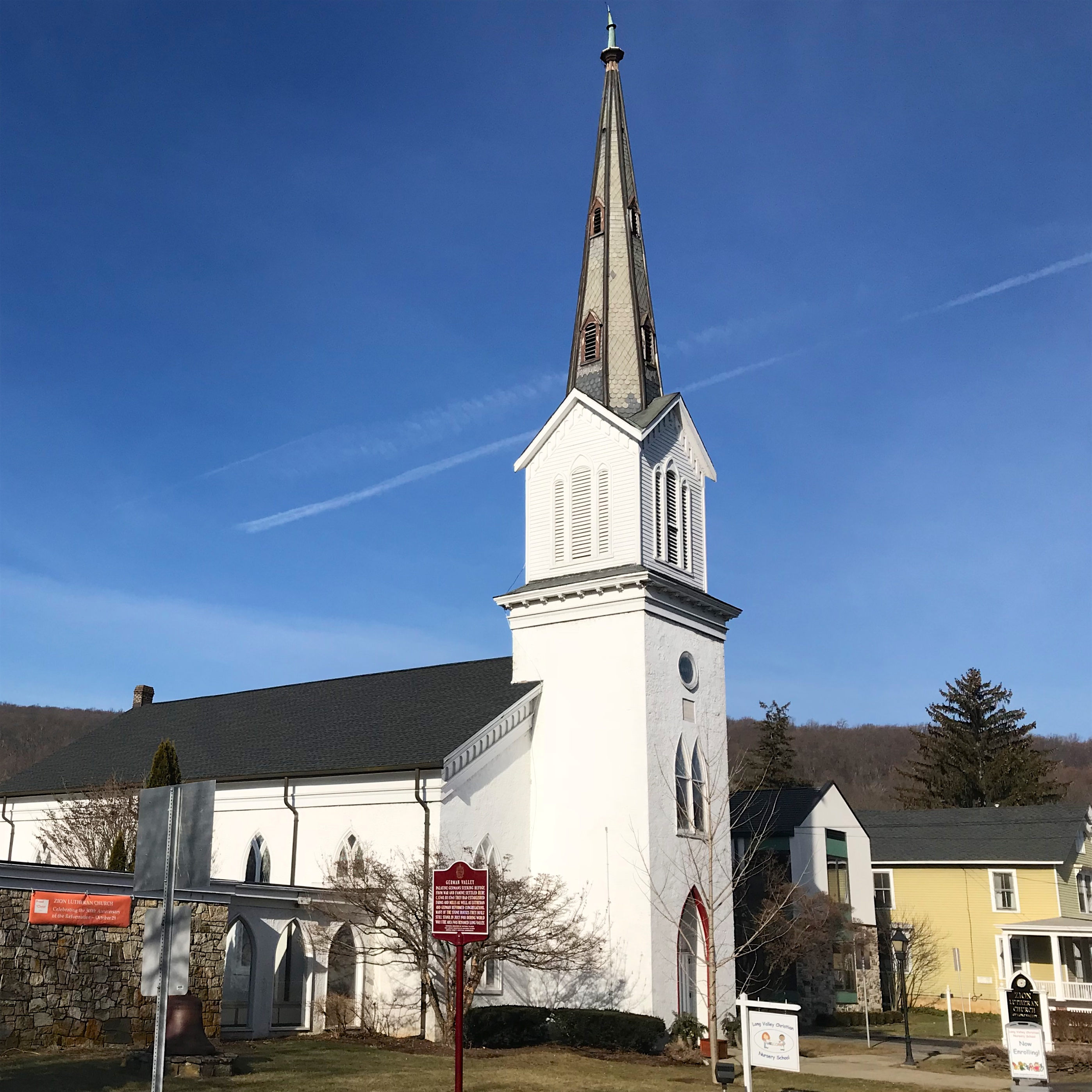
- Zion Lutheran Church in the center of Long Valley

- Location of Long Valley in Morris County highlighted in red (right). Inset map: Location of Morris County in New Jersey highlighted in orange (left).

- Location in Morris County Location in New Jersey Location in the United States
- Coordinates: 40.78225°N 74.776936°W
- Country: United States
- State: New Jersey
- County: Morris
- Township: Washington

Area
  - Total: 4.62 sq mi (11.97 km^{2})
  - Land: 4.57 sq mi (11.83 km^{2})
  - Water: 0.058 sq mi (0.15 km^{2}) 1.24%
- Elevation: 554 ft (169 m)

Population (2020)
  - Total: 1,827
  - Density: 400/sq mi (154.5/km^{2})
- Time zone: UTC−05:00 (Eastern (EST))
  - Summer (DST): UTC−04:00 (Eastern (EDT))
- ZIP Code: 07853
- Area code: 908
- FIPS code: 34-41400
- GNIS feature ID: 02390090

Long Valley is an unincorporated community and census-designated place (CDP) in Washington Township, Morris County, New Jersey, in the United States. Once known as German Valley from its foundation during the colonial era, the community was renamed in response to anti-German sentiment during World War I. As of the 2020 census, the CDP's population was 1,827.

== History ==
In 1705, a number of German Reformed, residing between Wolfenbüttel and Halberstadt, fled to Neuwied, a town of Rhenish Prussia, where they remained for two years before proceeding on to Holland. In 1707, they embarked for the British colony of New York. Before arriving, their ship was blown off-course to the south, where they were carried into Delaware Bay and landed in Philadelphia. From there, they embarked by land eastward to what became known as the "German Valley" in what was then called "Nova Caesaria" (New Jersey), located in today's Morris County.

== Geography ==
Long Valley is in southwestern Morris County, in the center of Washington Township. The village of Long Valley is at the center of the CDP, within the valley of the South Branch of the Raritan River. The CDP extends northwest up onto Schooleys Mountain, rising 600 feet (180 m) above the valley, where it includes the community of Springtown. To the southeast the CDP includes the lower Fox Hill Range, which rises 400 feet (120 m) above the valley. Chester is 4.5 miles (7.2 km) to the east via East Mill Road (CR 513), while Hackettstown is 6 miles (10 km) to the north via Schooley's Mountain Road (CR 517).

According to the U.S. Census Bureau, the CDP has a total area of 4.623 square miles (11.97 km^{2}), including 4.566 square miles (11.83 km^{2}) of land and 0.057 square miles (0.15 km^{2}) of water (1.24%). The South Branch of the Raritan River flows to the southwest through the community and joins the Raritan River in Somerset County.

The climate in this area is characterized by four distinct seasons and large seasonal temperature differences, with warm to hot (and often humid) summers and cold (sometimes severely cold in the northern areas) winters. According to the Köppen Climate Classification system, Long Valley has a humid continental climate, abbreviated "Dfa" on climate maps.

== Demographics ==
Historical population
Census	Pop.	Note	%±
1960	1,220		—
1970	1,645		34.8%
1980	1,682		2.2%
1990	1,744		3.7%
2000	1,818		4.2%
2010	1,879		3.4%
2020	1,827		−2.8%
Population sources: 1950 1960 1970; 1980 1990 2000; 2010 2020

Long Valley first appeared as an unincorporated community in the 1960 U.S. census; and then listed as a census designated place in the 1980 U.S. census.

=== 2020 census ===
Long Valley CDP, New Jersey – Racial and ethnic composition Note: the US Census treats Hispanic/Latino as an ethnic category. This table excludes Latinos from the racial categories and assigns them to a separate category. Hispanics/Latinos may be of any race.
Race / Ethnicity (NH = Non-Hispanic)	Pop 2000	Pop 2010	Pop 2020	% 2000	% 2010	% 2020
White alone (NH)	1,753	1,715	1,577	96.42%	91.27%	86.32%
Black or African American alone (NH)	12	10	13	0.66%	0.53%	0.71%
Native American or Alaska Native alone (NH)	4	0	0	0.22%	0.00%	0.00%
Asian alone (NH)	17	34	40	0.94%	1.81%	2.19%
Native Hawaiian or Pacific Islander alone (NH)	0	0	1	0.00%	0.00%	0.05%
Other race alone (NH)	0	1	10	0.00%	0.05%	0.55%
Mixed race or Multiracial (NH)	9	19	35	0.50%	1.01%	1.92%
Hispanic or Latino (any race)	23	100	151	1.27%	5.32%	8.26%
Total	1,818	1,879	1,827	100.00%	100.00%	100.00%

The 2020 United States census counted 1827 residents living in Long Valley. In the CDP there is an estimated 800 total households living in 713 housing units. The racial makeup was 86.3% (1577) White, 0.8% (15) Black or African American, 2% (44) Native American, 2.2% (41) Asian, 0.0005% (1) Pacific Islander, and 8.9% (164) from other races and two or more races. Hispanic or Latino of any race were 8.2% (151) of the population.

In Long Valley, the median age is 38.2 years old. About 12.5% (275) of the population is under the age of five, 67.2% (1,479) is between the ages of 18 and 64 and 11.4% (447) of the population are 65 or older. 50.5% of the population was male, 49.5% of the population is female.

The median income for a household in Long Valley is $104,722. The median income for males in Long Valley is $96,369, while the median income for females is $80,417.

Of the population, 21.1% have some form of a high school degree, 17.4% have some college but no degree, 9.5% have an associate degree, 26% have a bachelor's degree and 20.9% have a graduate or professional degree.

=== 2010 census ===
The 2010 United States census counted 1,879 people, 675 households, and 534 families in the CDP. The population density was 411.5 people per square mile (158.9 people/km^{2}). There were 709 housing units at an average density of 155.3 units per square mile (60.0 units/km^{2}). The racial makeup was 94.73% (1,780) White, 0.53% (10) Black or African American, 0.00% (0) Native American, 1.81% (34) Asian, 0.00% (0) Pacific Islander, 1.33% (25) from other races, and 1.60% (30) from two or more races. Hispanic or Latino of any race were 5.32% (100) of the population.

Of the 675 households, 37.0% had children under the age of 18; 65.8% were married couples living together; 9.5% had a female householder with no husband present and 20.9% were non-families. Of all households, 15.6% were made up of individuals and 6.1% had someone living alone who was 65 years of age or older. The average household size was 2.77 and the average family size was 3.10.

25.8% of the population were under the age of 18, 5.9% from 18 to 24, 21.0% from 25 to 44, 34.0% from 45 to 64, and 13.4% who were 65 years of age or older. The median age was 43.8 years. For every 100 females, the population had 97.2 males. For every 100 females ages 18 and older there were 96.5 males.

== Notable people ==
People who were born in, residents of, or otherwise closely associated with Long Valley include:

- Walt Ader (1913–1982), racecar driver who competed in the 1950 Indianapolis 500
- Jack Borgenicht (1911–2005), mountain climber, entrepreneur, preservationist and philanthropist
- Michael Burton (born 1992), professional football fullback for the Denver Broncos of the National Football League
- The Dolan Twins (born 1999), YouTube media personalities
- Guy R. Gregg (born 1949), politician who served in the New Jersey General Assembly from 1992 to 2008, where he represented the 24th Legislative District
- Celeste Holm (1917–2012), Oscar-winning actress
- Jacob W. Miller (1800–1862), politician who served two terms representing New Jersey in the United States Senate
- Henry Muhlenberg (1711–1787), founder of Lutheranism in America, who established a congregation in German Valley, which met at the Old Stone Church
- Tyler Muszelik (born 2004), professional ice hockey goaltender for the Charlotte Checkers of the American Hockey League
- Ida C. Nahm (1865–1922), medical doctor and clubwoman
- Andrew Politi (born 1996), professional baseball pitcher
- Mike Rossi (born 1994), freestyle aerialist
- Carley Shimkus (born 1986), news anchor and reporter who serves as a co-host on Fox Nation and as headlines reporter for Fox & Friends and Fox & Friends First
- Shannon Sohn (born 1974), television news reporter at WABC-TV Eyewitness News in New York City, where she became the first helicopter reporter to win a national Emmy Award
- Lisa Unger (born 1970), author of contemporary fiction
- Diana West (born 1965), lactation consultant and author specializing on the topic of breastfeeding
- Charles Wuorinen (1938–2020), Pulitzer Prize-winning composer of contemporary classical music

== Historic district ==
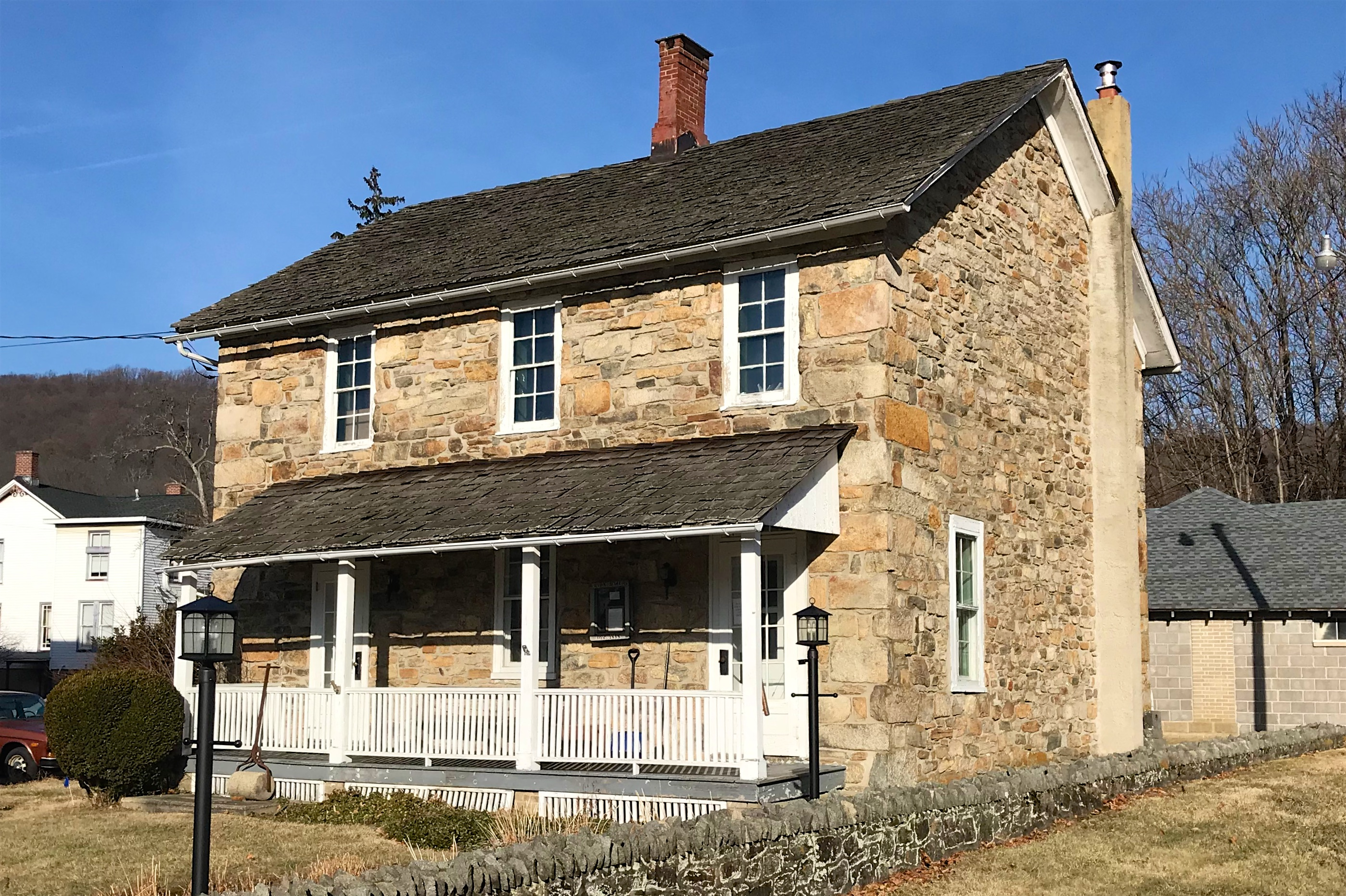
Former German Valley School in the historic district, now the Washington Township Historical Society Museum

The German Valley Historic District of Long Valley was added to the National Register of Historic Places on July 14, 1983, for its significance in agriculture, education, transportation, industry, and religion.
