= Augustus Lefebvre Revere =

American financier

- Born: August 8, 1861; Morristown, New Jersey, U.S.
- Died: May 20, 1910 (aged 48); Sansay House, Morristown, New Jersey, U.S.
- Resting place: Holy Rood Cemetery
- Occupations: Banker, stock broker
- Parent(s): Joseph Warren Revere; Rosanna Duncan Lamb Revere
- Relatives: Paul Revere (great grandfather); Paul Revere (brother)

Augustus Lefebvre Revere (August 8, 1861 – May 20, 1910) was an American financier, banker, stock broker, and civic leader from Morristown, New Jersey. He was a member of the Morristown Club, the Morristown Golf Club, the Morristown Field Club, and the Washington Association of New Jersey, the Society of Colonial Wars, and the Memorial Day Association.

He was the son of Joseph Warren Revere, and the great-grandson and "last [surviving] direct descendant" of Revolutionary War figure Paul Revere.

== Personal life ==
Augustus Lefebvre Revere was born on August 8, 1861 (some sources say 1858) in Morristown, New Jersey. His parents were Rosanna Duncan Lamb Revere and General Joseph Warren Revere.

Revere never married.

== Career and civic engagement ==
Circa 1911, he was the local manager of New York stock and bond brokers Taylor, Auchincloss & Joost, presumably in Paterson, New Jersey.

In 1891, Augustus Revere and his brother Paul Revere joined the Washington Association of New Jersey. Circa 1897, they were non-resident members of the New York Reform Club.

In 1899, he was a director of the Morristown Trust Co.

Circa 1901, art collector and publisher William Loring Andrews sent a copy of his book Paul Revere and His Engraving to A. L. Revere. He thanked Revere for his kind letter and described how he enjoyed compiling his great-grandfather's artwork.

In 1907, he was elected as Alderman, presumably of Morristown.

== Death and legacy ==
On May 20, 1910, he died of tuberculosis at his home, the historic Sansay House in Morristown. He was serving his second term as Morristown Alderman when he died, as well as being a vestryman at the Church of the Redeemer.

=== Will ===
Upon his 1910 death, Revere gave away $150,000 of his wealth (equivalent to $5.2 million in 2025). He named the Morristown Trust Co. (where he was a director circa 1899) as the will's executor, probated by surrogate David Young.

He left $25,000 to Morristown's Episcopal Church of the Redeemer as an endowment fund as well as an additional $25,000 for the erection of a new building. He gave the Morristown Trust Company where he worked $20,000, "the income of which is to be paid to...Marie Amelia Revere, of Canton, Mass.," and "at her death $20,000...to be given to the Harvard University." The Harvard University grant was "to be known as the Revere Family Memorial Fund, and the income to be used for the purchase of books and plaster casts or other art objects for the use of the School of Architecture or for the assistance of needy students of the school." Harvard received the money in 1913.

He gave the Morristown Church of the Assumption $500 to continue building a wall around its cemetery "from its present terminus to the main gate on Whippany road."

Revere granted all of the Sansay House's furniture and "bric-à-brac" to his surviving mother, Rosanna Duncan Lamb Revere. He also left $1,000 to be divided among his servants.

He gave the All Souls' Hospital in Morristown $10,000 as the Paul Revere Memorial Fund, to be used for the erection of a new building. The hospital's president was his late brother, Paul Revere. He donated $2,500 each to two charities: the Market Street Mission of Morristown and the Society for Providing Medical Attendance to the Worthy Poor of the Township of Morris.

He gave the Morristown Trust Co. $6,000 to erect a granite and bronze flagpole base in the Morristown Green inscribed "Erected in memory of General Joseph Warren Revere," his father. He also gave $1,000 for an oil portrait of his father to be placed in the New Jersey State House at Trenton.

=== Later legacy ===
In the winter of 1996, Fosterfields Living Historical Farm hosted an interpretive exhibit wherein museum guests were given the roles of Caroline Foster's friends and other local millionaires while touring the Reveres' Willows mansion. One of these historical figures was Augustus Revere.
