= William Loring Andrews =

American book collector and Met librarian (1837–1920)

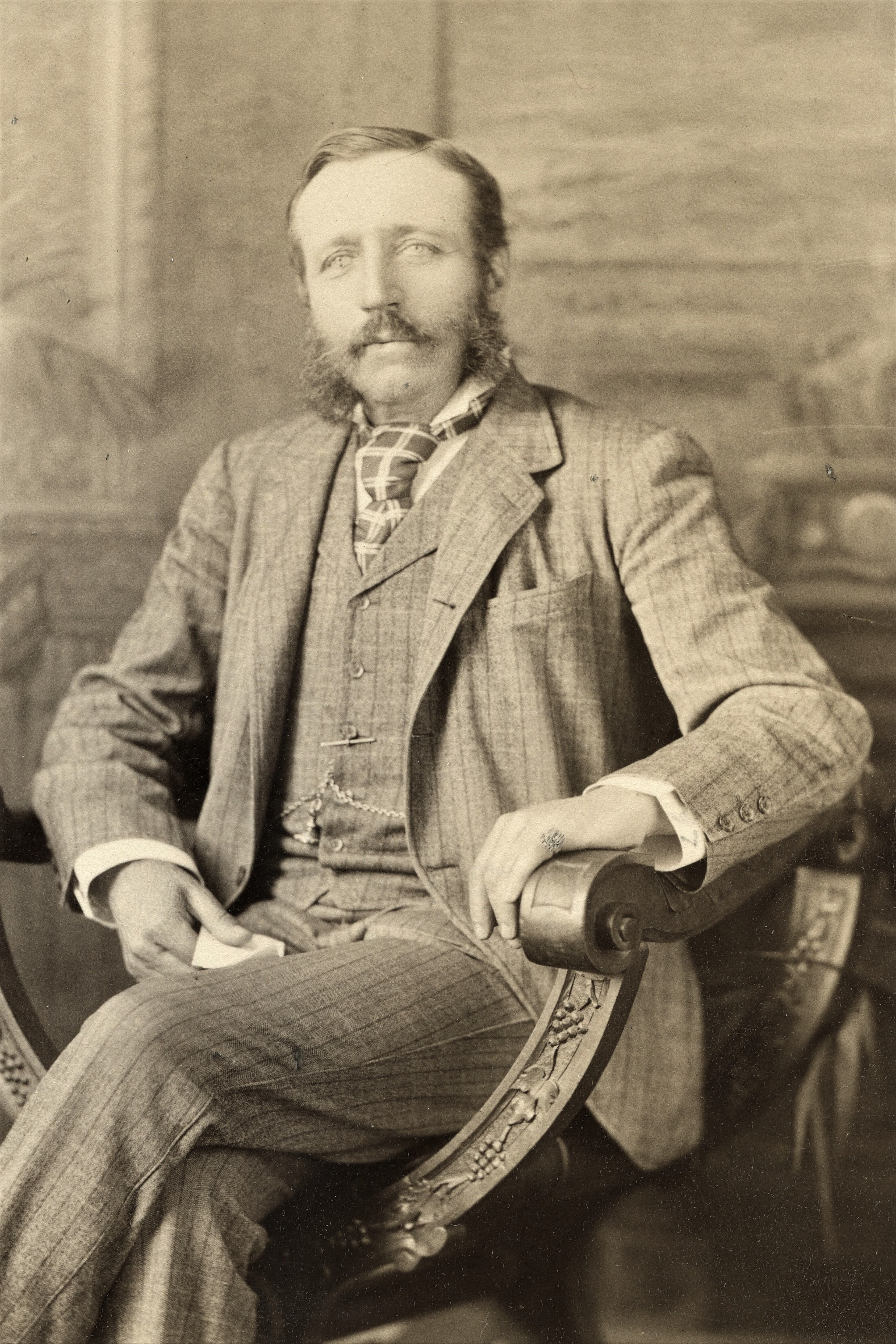
- Born: September 9, 1837
- Died: March 19, 1920 (aged 82)
- Known for: Art collection

William Loring Andrews (September 9, 1837 – March 19, 1920) was an American rare book collector, publisher, and librarian. He was a trustee and the first librarian of New York's Metropolitan Museum of Art and its advocate for forty years. From 1888 to 1892, he served as the founder and president of the Grolier Club. He was also the founder and only president of the Society of Iconophiles. He was "an enthusiastic and discriminating collector of rare books, prints, paintings, and porcelains."

He published 36 books, about 24 of which he wrote; many detailed "bookish themes" and/or New York City history. Andrews "selected the paper, typography, and bindings" for all of his books, while E. D. French and Sidney L. Smith provided tailpieces and other graphic elements.

According to the Met, "Andrews was a fundamental force in the early days of The Met, and he was the pivotal figure in the development and collection growth at The Met's great library."

== Early life ==
William Loring Andrews was born on September 9, 1837, in Manhattan, New York. He was born to Caroline C. Delamater Andrews and Loring Andrews. A posthumous obituary claimed he "was a descendant of that 'first settler' William Andrews, one of the Davenport Company which 'sailed from Boston in 1638 and settled the town of Quinnipiac, which they afterwards called New Haven.'"

On October 17, 1860, Andrews married Jane E. Crane (her father was Theodore Crane). They had two sons: Loring William Andrews and Theodore Crane Andrews. Both sons died in their youth. Loring W. Andrews died in 1882 while a senior at Yale, due to "a gun-shot wound received while on a duck shooting excursion." Theodore died in 1878, and was described as "bright in mind and engaging in manners...His taste and execution in Music were unusual. He studied Harmony when twelve years of age, and his mathematical ability at a very early age was marked." Both sons were avid collectors like their father.

== Retirement and Metropolitan Museum of Art ==
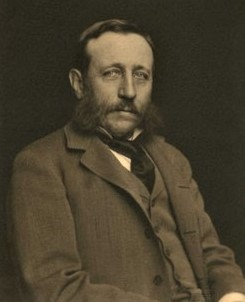
Photograph of Andrews, unknown year

In 1878, Andrews retired from his father's leather and hide business. He began to have leisure time due to his retirement, which enabled him to become involved with the Metropolitan.

In March 1880, the Met's first building in Central Park opened, designed by Calbert Vaux and Jacob Wrey Mould. On August 28 of 1880, Andrews wrote to Metropolitan director Luigi Palma di Cesnola, "I shall be back in town by the middle of September with plenty of leisure time to do what I can to be at the Museum and especially to try to work up the library—would like to find someone to start it with 10,000 dollars." When the Museum moved from 14th street to its building in the park, Andrews "actually carried many of the things in baskets, himself, to prevent harm coming to them," impressing Met President Cesnola with his devotion. That year, the Metropolitan officially appointed Andrews as its first librarian.

He lived on 38th street and commuted to the Metropolitan by bicycle.

In 1885, Andrews asked prolific engraver Edwin Davis French to create The Met library's first bookplate. Sidney Lawton Smith designed Andrew's personal bookplate in an unknown year.

In 1895, Andrews was appointed Honorary Librarian to allow the Met to hire its first salaried full-time librarian, William Clifford.

Circa 1901, Andrews sent a copy of his book Paul Revere and His Engraving to New Jersey financier Augustus Lefebvre Revere. A. L. Revere was Paul Revere's great-grandson and last remaining relative. Andrews thanked Revere for his kind letter and described how he enjoyed compiling his great-grandfather's artwork.

== Bibliography ==
| Year | Title | Publisher | Notes |
|---|---|---|---|
| 1892 | Roger Payne and his art: a short account of his life and work as a binder | De Vinne Press | |
| 1892 | Jean Grolier de Servier, viscount d'Aguisy : some account of his life and of his famous library | De Vinne Press | |
| 1893 | The Bradford map : the city of New York at the time of the granting of the Montgomery charter | De Vinne Press | |
| 1895 | The old booksellers of New York and other papers | Unknown | |
| 1895 | The old booksellers of New York and other papers | Unknown | |
| 1896 | An essay on the portraiture of the American revolutionary war : being an account of a number of the engraved portraits connected therewith, remarkable for their rarity or otherwise interesting | The Gillis Brothers Press | |
| 1897 | New Amsterdam, New Orange, New York : a chronologically arranged account of engraved views of the city from the first picture published in MDCLI until the year MDCCC | Dodd, Mead and Company | Illustrated by Edwin Davis French |
| 1897 | The journey of the iconophiles around New York in search of the historical and picturesque | The Gillis Brothers Press | |
| 1899 | A trio of eighteenth century French engravers of portraits in miniature. Ficquet, Savart, Grateloup | Dodd, Mead and Company | |
| 1900 | James Lyne's survey or, as it is more commonly known the Bradford map: a plan of the city of New York at the time of the granting of the Montgomery charter in 1731: an appendix to an account of the same | Dodd, Mead and Company | |
| 1900 | Gossip about book collecting | Dodd, Mead and Company | |
| 1901 | The iconography of the Battery and Castle Garden | Charles Scribner's Sons | |
| 1901 | Paul Revere and his engraving | Charles Scribner's Sons | Praised by Revere's last remaining relative, Augustus Lefebvre Revere |
| 1902 | Bibliopegy in the United States: and kindred subjects | Dodd, Mead and Company | |
| 1902 | Bibliopegy In The United States And Kindred Subjects | Dodd, Mead and Company | |
| 1905 | New York as Washington knew it after the Revolution | Charles Scribner's Sons | |
| 1906 | An index to the illustrations on the Manuals of the corporation of the city of New York, 1841-1870 | The Society of Iconophiles | |
| 1906 | The Continental insurance company of New York, 1853-1905: a historical sketch | Continental insurance Co. | |
| 1908 | Jacob Steendam, noch vaster: a memoir of the first poet in New Netherland | Dodd, Mead and Company | |
| 1908 | The heavenly Jervsalem. A mediaeval song of the joys of the chvrch trivmphant | Charles Scribner's Sons | |
| 1913 | Catalogue of the William Loring Andrews collection of early books in the Library of Yale university | Yale University Press | |

== Death and legacy ==
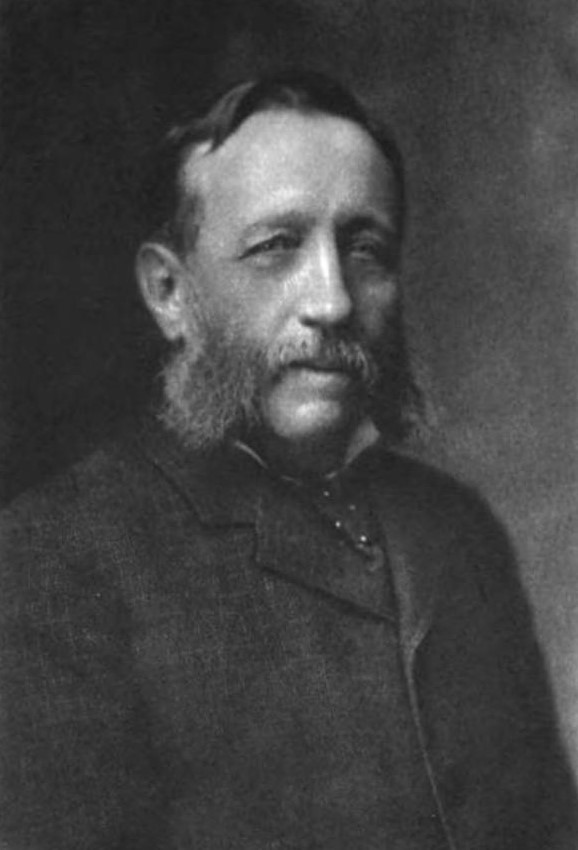
Andrews published in In Memoriam, 1921.

He died on March 19, 1920, in New York and was buried at the Green-Wood Cemetery in Brooklyn.

On April 22, 1920, a memorial meeting was held in honor of Andrews's legacy. It was attended by and featured speakers from the Grolier Club, the Society of Iconophiles, and the Metropolitan Museum of Art. It was described in the 1921 In Memoriam: William Loring Andrews, a privately printed book of which 50 copies were distributed.
