= Buck's Hotel =

- Interactive map of the Buck's Hotel area

General information
- Location: Jersey City, New Jersey, 68–70 York Street, United States
- Coordinates: 40°42′57.85″N 74°2′10.48″W
- Opened: 18th or 19th century
- Demolished: 1891
- Owner: John Buck

Buck's Hotel was a 19th-century hotel in Jersey City, New Jersey, described as "John Buck's famous hotel."

Circa 1838, the hotel served as Jersey City's first city hall after Jersey City's separation from Bergen Township.

In 1880, it was the death site of Union general and author Joseph Warren Revere.

The hotel was torn down in 1891 to expand the Evening Journal building.

== Description ==
According to the 1895 History of Jersey City, N.J.:

This was a large frame building with an entrance for teams under its eastern end. The long room was over this team entrance. There was a livery and exchange stable at the rear, extending to Montgomery Street.

== History ==
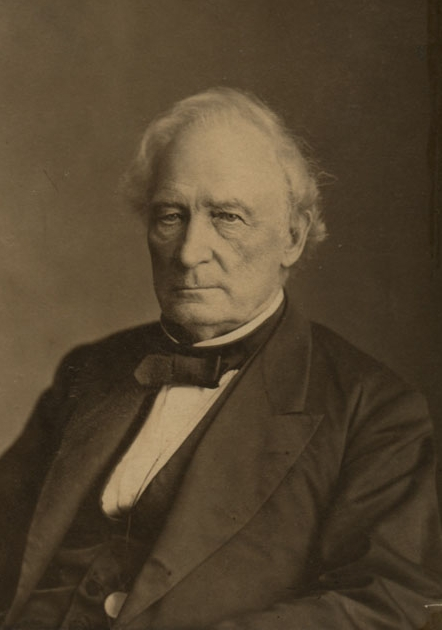
Jersey City's first mayor, Dudley S. Gregory, photographed circa 1865. Gregory held multiple meetings at Buck's Hotel.

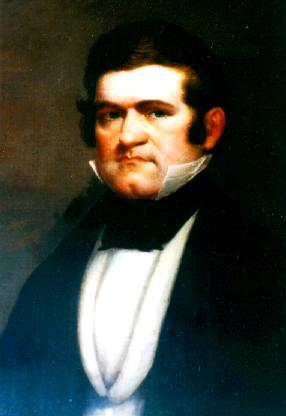
Circa 1840 painting of Thomas Abraham Alexander, secretary of the board of selectmen which met at Buck's Hotel.

Sources do not indicate when the hotel was established; however, sources identify the owner as John Buck.

Circa 1837, citizens urged the board of selectmen to make improvements to Jersey City, including improvements to roads, lighting, night watch, fire engine, wells, pumps, and cisterns. However, insufficient funds complicated this.

On January 9, 1838, the board of selectmen called an emergency meeting at Buck's Hotel to discuss the issue. John Griffith was chosen as chair with Thomas A. Alexander as secretary. The selectmen discussed the needs of the town. A few days later, they did so again; an 1838 report describes:

At a very large meeting of the inhabitants of Jersey City held pursuant to Public Notice at the long room in Buck's Hotel on Saturday evening, January 13th, 1838, the charter as amended was discussed and recommendations made for its adoption and urging its passage.

The new charter was approved in February 1838, the same month Jersey City became independent from Bergen Township.

On February 22, 1838, the board of Aldermen met at Buck's to discuss further reductions to budget, such as reducing the watchmen from 3 per night to 1 per night. Constituents included Mayor Dudley S. Gregory, Peter McMartin, Peter Bentley, James M. Hoyt, Williams Glaze, Henry Southmayed, Isaac Edge, John Dows/Dowes, John Griffith, Jonathan Jenkins and Ebenezer Lewis. On February 28, the act was passed with a referendum.

Following an election in March, the selectmen held their last meeting in the Buck Hotel on April 7, 1838.

On April 16, 1838, Jersey City's first mayoral meeting occurred at Buck's Hotel; Jersey City's first mayor Dudley S. Gregory and the newly appointed council met in the "long room," with the council consisting of the same persons as the board of Aldermen listed above.

On April 15, 1880, Union general Joseph Warren Revere experienced what was likely a heart attack while on a ferry to New York City. Friends placed Revere in the hotel, where he died on April 20, 1880.

In 1891, the hotel was torn down to make way for the extension of the Evening Journal plant, which was built alongside the hotel in 1874. In 1911, the Evening Journal headquarters would move to Journal Square in 1911, giving Journal Square its namesake.

== See also ==
- History of New Jersey
- Mayor of Jersey City, New Jersey
