= Market Street Mission =

American charity organization

- Formation: 1889; 137 years ago
- Headquarters: 9 Market Street, Morristown, New Jersey 07960
- Executive Director: Gordon Dahl
- Affiliations: Christianity
- Website: marketstreet.org

Market Street Mission is an American charity organization and Christian mission based in Morristown, New Jersey.

The organization operates a homeless shelter, meals, and emergency services, along with men's drug addiction recovery groups, community counseling, a chapel, and a thrift store. All services center on Christian belief and/or conversion.

== Demographics ==
In 1965, the average resident was 55; a decade later, 45. In 2017, the average age of men in their program was "late 20's or early 30's".

== Approach ==
Since their foundation in 1889, the Mission's recovery programs emphasized "a Christ-centered message and hard work".

According to the Mission, their strategies have not drastically altered in the past century. However, new alcoholic and drug treatments were added in the latter decades of the 20th century. The Mission claims their current program "targets whole life recovery, addressing the spiritual, physical and emotional needs of [their] guests."

== History ==
=== Precursor ===
The Mission began as a religious study group, wherein Louisa Graves Owen led women's Bible study classes in her home. She soon learned that almost all of the members' husbands were alcoholics and took action.

=== 19th century ===
Owen and her husband, Reverend Dr. F. W. Owen rented the building at 9 Market Street to set up a residential program for alcoholic men.

Its first meeting was held on March 18, 1889, "in a small unused store room", and continued to have nightly meetings. Its first meeting included George Redding, aged 61, who testified "almost nightly" that God has saved him from "rum, beer, cider, and opium". Redding testified to the "genuineness of his conversion" at nearly every meeting until his death circa 1894.

Without a single intermission, nightly meetings were held until at least 1914. The meeting grew until, in 1891, the entire property, including the adjoining store was purchased by trustees of the Morristown's South Street Presbyterian Church for meeting use.

In November 1892, Ironside established a reading room, open to all. The following year, the Mission installed a free ice-water fountain outside its building, and in 1894 placed another on Speedwell Avenue, likely for public safety as well as to "serve the cause of temperance".

Its location was "strategically situated amidst saloons". At the time, Market Street was nicknamed "Rum Alley" or "Rum Lane" for its concentration of bars.

In 1891, a description of the Mission was published in the University of Wisconsin's Proceedings of the...Convention of Christian Workers in the United States and Canada. Reverend Thomas B. Ironside was the superintendent at the time, and possibly the first leader of the organization. In 1894, Market Street Mission reported a yearly attendance of 31,000, with 140 conversions to Christianity.

On February 2, 1898, a fire destroyed the original quarters. By June 4, 1898, Market Street Mission was the owner of the "3 story brick and stone Mission building" on Market Street beside the Morristown Green. On November 2, 1898, the new location opened; A History of Morris County described it as a "large and especially planned building, beautiful and complete in all its details". The building was constructed by architect W. C. Van Doren, whose office was located at #130 Broadway, New York City. That year, the Mission debuted a two-horse Gospel Wagon. It toured Morristown every Sunday, joined by a group of local soloists, and "facilitated outdoor meetings". The year's total meeting attendance was 31,820.

=== 20th century ===
Circa 1907, the Mission toured its Gospel Wagon around Morristown every Sunday, joined by a group of local vocal soloists. That year, on October 24, the Gospel Wagon "hit upon the use of a phonograph", which played "sacred music...from [its] large horn". The publicity stunt successfully drew audiences, and The New York Observer reported that "hereafter the Gospel wagon will carry the phonograph along on all trips."

It was included in a 1909 Annual Report of the New York Association for Improving the Condition of the Poor.

In 1910, the Mission received a $2,500 donation from Morristown resident Augustus Lefebvre Revere upon his death.

In 1914, The Continent reported that the Mission was celebrating its 25th anniversary. It was "conducted by South Street church", and invited mission superintendents from the New York area to speak every evening. At the time, it had a total of 108,000 meals, 39,060 applicants given lodging, and 2,053 Christian conversions. Ironside continued to be the mission's superintendent.

In 1926, the Mission assisted families and victims of the Picatinny Arsenal explosion, many of whom were left "without shelter or clothing".

The Mission added a thrift store in the 1930s, which became self-supporting within two months. The thrift store was significant for providing new employment opportunities during the Great Depression.

In the 1970s, it hosted the Morris County Social Detoxification Center as well as the One Way Coffee House, a café where "young people could come for food, coffee, and informal counseling on Friday and Saturday nights."

As of 1988, the Mission could house up to 50 residents.

In 1994, extensive renovations at 9 Market Street occurred. In 2001, the Mission opened a 10 Bank Street location which houses the Career Education Center, counseling offices, a recreation and exercise floor, a kitchen pantry facility, a shelter, and administrative offices. As of 2009, it had 100 beds. Another renovation occurred in 2017, when an outpatient counseling center was opened which was "available to the community at large".
