= Rosanna Duncan Lamb Revere =

- Born: April 16, 1819; Boston, Massachusetts
- Died: July 26, 1910 (aged 91); Morristown, New Jersey

Rosanna Duncan Lamb Revere (April 16, 1819 – July 26, 1910) was a founding member of the Daughters of the American Revolution, and served as Morristown Regent and New Jersey's Honorary State Regent.

== Life ==
Rosanna Duncan Lamb was born on April 16, 1819, in Boston, Massachusetts. Her parents were Benjamin Waldo Lamb and Deziah Lamb. She was presumably named for her maternal grandmother, Rosanna Lamb née Duncan. Her grandfather was Thomas Lamb (b. 1755), a lieutenant in Henry Jackson's Massachusetts regiment.

In 1842, she married Joseph Warren Revere, grandson of American revolutionary figure Paul Revere.

She was listed in Clark's Boston Blue book at 9 Newbury Street in 1876.

In March 1881, she was among the members of the Woman's Art Exchange, a New Jersey–based organization to "encourage art studies in a line available to women" and "provide a mart or exchange where the products of their labor may be taken for disposal." Each member was entitled to enter three women artists for one year. Eligible artwork included needlework, woolen, and knit goods, and art classes included oil and watercolor painting and drawing in crayon.

== Death and legacy ==
Revere is quoted about her lineage in the 1902 book Genealogy of the Waldo Family of Ipswich, Massachusetts.

She was listed as residing in the historic Sansay House in the 1909 New York Social Register.

She died on July 26, 1910. Her funeral was held on July 28 in Morristown and was reported upon in The Boston Globe.
