= The Jersey Journal =

American newspaper based in New Jersey

- Type: Daily newspaper
- Format: Tabloid
- Owner: Advance Publications
- Publisher: David Blomquist
- Editor: Margaret Schmidt
- Founded: May 2, 1867
- Ceased publication: February 1, 2025
- Headquarters: Harmon Plaza; Secaucus, New Jersey, U.S.
- OCLC number: 44512660
- Website: NJ.com

The Jersey Journal was a daily newspaper, published from Monday through Saturday, covering news and events throughout Hudson County, New Jersey, which was founded in 1867. Advance Publications bought the paper in 1945. At the time it was discontinued in 2025, The Journal was a sister paper to Advance's other daily newspapers in the region, The Star-Ledger of Newark, The Times of Trenton and the Staten Island Advance.

== History ==
Founded by Civil War veterans William Dunning and Z. K. Pangborn, the Jersey Journal was originally known as the Evening Journal and was first published on May 2, 1867. The newspaper's first offices were located at 13 Exchange Place in Jersey City with a reported initial capitalization of $119.

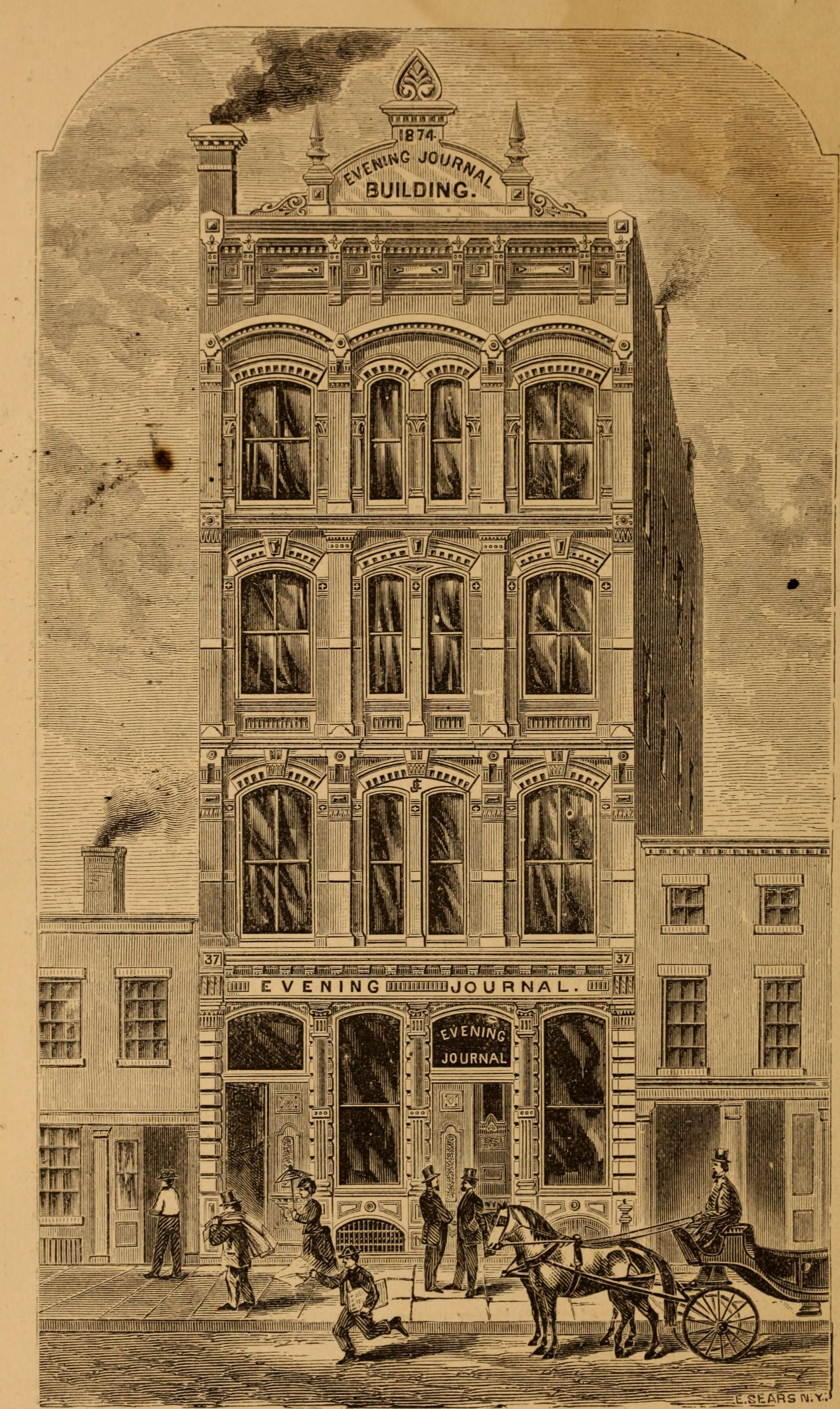
Evening Journal Building, 1876

The newspaper built a new office building on 37 Montgomery Street in 1874.

Editor Joseph A. Dear changed the Evening Journal to its current name in 1909.

The paper relocated again, in 1911, to a building at the northeast corner of Bergen and Sip Avenues. This building was demolished in 1923 to make room for Journal Square, which took its name from the newspaper. The Journal made its home at 30 Journal Square for the next 90 years. Its weekly Spanish-language publication, El Nuevo Hudson, ceased publication after the February 26, 2009, edition.

In December 2012, it was announced that the newspaper would sell the building and relocate to another location in Hudson County. In August 2013, the paper announced it would move to Secaucus, which it did in January 2014. It maintains offices at 30 Montgomery Street in Jersey City.

The newspaper's circa-1911 headquarters at 30 Journal Square

On October 30, 2024, the Jersey Journal announced that it would cease publication on February 1, 2025, citing rising printing costs following the recent closure of its production facility in Montville, New Jersey. In a local article announcing its closure, Jersey Journal editor and publisher David Blomquist stated '[a]n online-only publication simply would not have enough scale to support the strong, politically independent journalism that has distinguished The Journal'. The newspaper's 17 employees — eight full-time and nine part-time — would be fired when publication ends.

== Newspapers in Education Program ==
The Jersey Journal's Newspapers in Education Program, supported with an additional sponsorship, comprises three annual events and awards: the Hudson County Science Fair, the Hudson County Spelling Bee, and the Everyday Heroes Awards.

== Timeline ==
- 1867–1909: The newspaper is published as The Evening Journal.
- 1871: Its building is on 142 Greene Street.
- 1874: Headquarters move to 37 Montgomery Street.
- 1891: The Journal demolishes the historic Buck's Hotel to expand the back of its building.
- 1909: The name is changed to The Jersey Journal.
- 1911: The headquarters are moved to Journal Square.
- 1951: The paper merges with The Jersey Observer.
- 2014: The paper's offices move from Jersey City to Secaucus.
- 2024: The paper announces its closure effective February 1, 2025.
- 2025: The paper released its final issue on February 1, 2025.
