= Grolier Club =

Bibliophilic club in Manhattan, New York

- The Grolier Club's home at 47 East 60th Street
- Formation: 1884; 142 years ago
- Coordinates: 40°45′50″N 73°58′12″W
- President: Ken Soehner
- Website: www.grolierclub.org

The Grolier Club is a museum, library, private club and society of bibliophiles in New York City. Founded in January 1884, it is the oldest existing bibliophilic club in North America. It is named after Jean Grolier de Servières, Viscount d'Aguisy, Treasurer General of France, whose library was famous; his motto, "Io. Grolierii et amicorum" [of or belonging to Jean Grolier and his friends], suggested his generosity in sharing books.

The Club's stated objective is "the literary study of the arts pertaining to the production of books, including the occasional publication of books designed to illustrate, promote and encourage these arts; and the acquisition, furnishing and maintenance of a suitable club building for the safekeeping of its property, wherein meetings, lectures and exhibitions shall take place from time to time..."

The Grolier Club of the City of New York has 13-6162403 as 501(c)(3) Public Charity; in 2024 it claimed total revenue of $2,592,381 and $29,114,038 in total assets. The entity lists the following purpose: “The mission of the Grolier Club is to foster the study, collecting, and appreciation of books and works on paper, their art, history, production, and commerce. It pursues this mission through the maintenance of a research library devoted to all aspects of the book and graphic arts and especially bibliography; through the publication of books designed to illustrate, promote and encourage the book and graphic arts; and through public exhibitions and other educational programs.”

== Collections and programs ==
The Grolier Club maintains a research library specializing in books, bibliography and bibliophily, printing (especially the history of printing and examples of fine printing), binding, illustration and bookselling. The Grolier Club has one of the more extensive collections of book auction and bookseller catalogs in North America. The Library also has the archives of prominent bibliophiles, such as Sir Thomas Phillipps, and of bibliophile and print collecting groups, such as the Hroswitha Club of women book collectors (1944–c. 1999) (Note: Named for Hrotsvitha of Gandersheim) and the Society of Iconophiles. Most bibliophile clubs do not maintain a clubhouse and a library as the Grolier Club does, with some other exceptions including the Book Club of California and The Club of Odd Volumes.

The Grolier Club's public exhibitions "treat books and prints as objects worthy of display, on a par with painting and sculpture." The exhibitions on two gallery floors draw on various sources including holdings of the Club, its members, and of institutional libraries. Subjects of its recent shows include women in science (2013), blooks (2016), Walt Whitman (2019), American menus (2023), Zoe Anderson Norris (2023), Abraham Lincoln (2024, from David Rubenstein's collection), and imaginary books (2024-2025).

In 2022 the Rare Book School was featured in the exhibit, Building the Book from the Ancient World to the Present Day: Five Decades of Rare Book School & the Book Arts Press. The exhibit covered two millennia of the changing form of the book.

The Grolier Club, which also hosts frequent public tours and lectures, is a member of the Fellowship of American Bibliophilic Societies.

== History ==
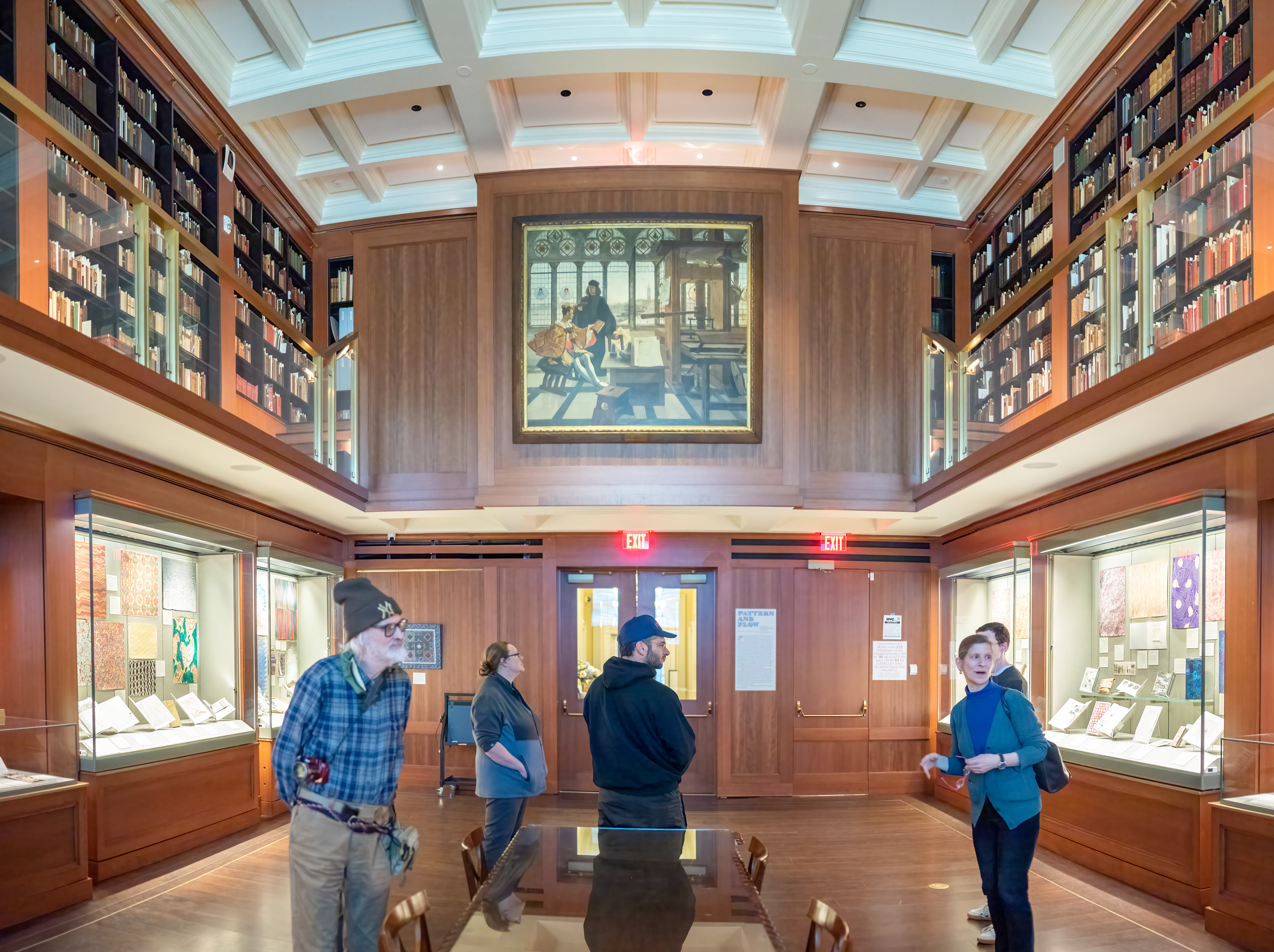
Interior

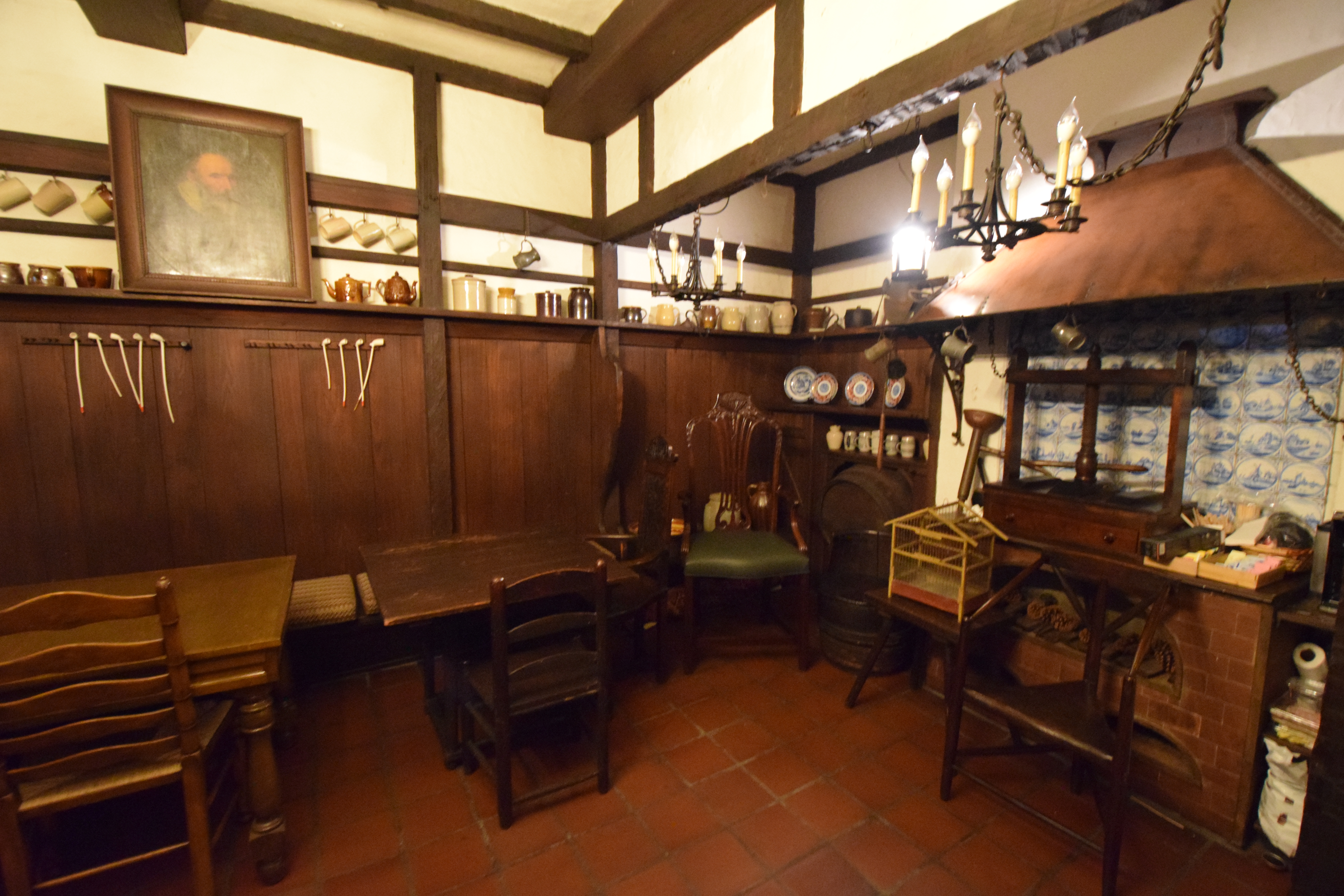
Dutch kitchen

The Grolier Club was formed on January 23, 1884, with 50 members and was formally incorporated in 1888. The founders of the club were William Loring Andrews, Theodore L. DeVinne, A. W. Drake, Albert Gallup, Robert Hoe III, Brayton Ives, Samuel W. Marvin, E. S. Mead, and Arthur B. Turnure. Perfection in the art of bookmaking was encouraged. E. D. French engraved the club's own bookplate as well as bookplates for many of its members.

Honorary members have included I.N. Phelps Stokes (elected 1927), Bruce Rogers (1928), Henry Watson Kent (1930), Franklin D. Roosevelt (1934), Rudolph Ruzicka (1946), Lawrence C. Wroth (1950), Carl Purington Rollins (1951), Elmer Adler (1952), Joseph Blumenthal (1967), Margaret Bingham Stillwell (1977) and Mary C. Hyde Eccles (1989). Honorary Foreign Corresponding members have included Emery Walker (elected 1920), Alfred W. Pollard (1921), Sir Geoffrey Keynes (1922), Michael Sadleir (1925), Stanley Morison (1951), Giovanni Mardersteig (1964), Howard M. Nixon (1971), Nicolas Barker (1972), John Carter (1973), and Hermann Zapf (2003). Harry Elkins Widener, the wealthy young bibliophile whose early death in the sinking of the RMS Titanic inspired his mother to construct Harvard's Harry Elkins Widener Memorial Library, had been a member.

From April 20 to June 5, 1971, a newly-discovered pre-Columbian Maya codex was displayed in the club, giving the codex the name the Grolier Codex. In 1973 the club published a facsimile of the codex in a book by Michael D. Coe.

=== Buildings ===
The Grolier Club has had three locations since its founding. Its first home was rented space at 64 Madison Avenue, which it quickly outgrew. It moved in 1890 to a Romanesque Revival building at 29 East 32nd Street (now a designated city landmark).

The third and current clubhouse at 47 East 60th Street, on the Upper East Side, was designed by Bertram Grosvenor Goodhue. The cornerstone was laid in December 1916, and the clubhouse opened almost exactly a year later. Its members-only upper-floor spaces include a simulation of a 17th-century New York Dutch taproom. A 51-story apartment tower beside the Grolier Club was built with air rights purchased from the club and the adjoining Christ Church.

== List of presidents ==
The following people have served as presidents of the club:

- Robert Hoe III (1884–1888)
- William Loring Andrews (1888–1892)
- Beverly Chew (1892–1896)
- Samuel Putnam Avery (1896–1900) Porträt: Medaille 1897 by Anton Scharff (1845–1903)
- Howard Mansfield (1900–1904)
- Theodore Low De Vinne (1904–1906)
- Edwin B. Holden (1906)
- Richard Hoe Lawrence (1906–1908)
- William F. Havemeyer (1908–1912)
- Edward G. Kennedy (1912–1916)
- Arthur H. Scribner (1916–1920)
- Henry Watson Kent (1920–1924)
- William B. Osgood Field (1924–1928)
- Lucius Wilmerding (1928–1932)
- William B. Ivins Jr. (1932–1935)
- Frederick Coykendall (1935–1939)
- Harry T. Peters (1939–1943)
- Edwin De T. Bechtel (1943–1947)
- Frederick B. Adams Jr. (1947–1951)
- Irving S. Olds (1951–1955)
- Arthur A. Houghton (1955–1957)
- C. Waller Barrett (1957–1961)
- Donald F. Hyde (1961–1965)
- Gordon N. Ray (1965–1969)
- Alfred H. Howell (1969–1973)
- Robert H. Taylor (1973–1975)
- Herman W. Liebert (1975–1978)
- Robert D. Graff (1978–1982)
- Frank S. Streeter (1982–1986)
- G. Thomas Tanselle (1986–1990)
- Kenneth A. Lohf (1990–1994)
- William Bradford Warren (1994–1998)
- William T. Buice III (1998–2002)
- Carolyn L. Smith (2002–2006)
- William H. Helfand (2006–2010)
- Eugene S. Flamm (2010–2014)
- G. Scott Clemons (2014–2018)
- Bruce J. Crawford (2018–2022)
- Nancy K. Boehm (2022–2026)
- Ken Soehner (2026-)

== Publications ==
The Club has issued editions of the following works:

- Richard de Bury, Philobiblon
- George William Curtis, Washington Irving
- Robert Hoe, Catalogues of Early and Original Editions from Langland to Wither; Bookbinding as a Fine Art
- Geoffrey Keynes, A Bibliography of William Blake (1921)
- Theodore Low De Vinne, Historic Printing Types
- William Matthews, Modern Book Binding
- Ames, Alexander Lawrence, and Mark Samuels Lasner. Grolier Club Bookplates: Past & Present. New York: The Grolier Club, 2023.
- Fletcher, H. George. Judging a Book by Its Cover: Bookbindings from the Collections of the Grolier Club, 1470s-2020. New York: The Grolier Club, 2023.
- Hispanic Museum & Library, Mitchell Codding, John O’Neill, Patrick Lenaghan, Szilvia E. Szmuk, Grolier Club, and Pine Tree Foundation of New York (2021). Treasures from the Hispanic Society Library. New York: The Grolier Club.

== See also ==
- List of American gentlemen's clubs
- Books in the United States
