= Paul Revere (lawyer) =

American lawyer, great-grandson of Revolutionary Paul Revere

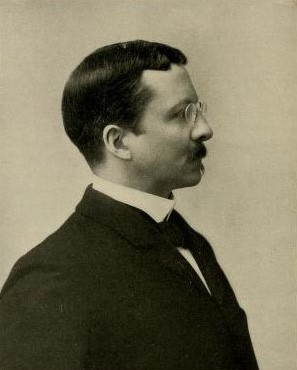
- Photograph before or circa 1899.
- Born: September 28, 1856; Morristown, New Jersey, U.S.
- Died: November 10, 1901 (aged 45); Morristown, New Jersey, U.S.
- Resting place: Holy Rood Cemetery, Morristown
- Education: Harvard Law School
- Occupations: Lawyer, writer, civic leader
- Parent(s): Joseph Warren Revere; Rosanna Duncan Lamb Revere
- Relatives: Paul Revere (great grandfather); Augustus Lefebvre Revere (brother)

Signature
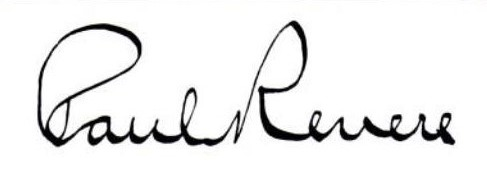

Paul Revere (September 28, 1856 – November 10, 1901) was a lawyer, writer, public speaker, and civic member of Morristown, New Jersey. He was the great-grandson of American revolutionary figure Paul Revere, and his father was Navy officer and Union general Joseph Warren Revere.

In 1891, Revere became the founding chairman and president of the All Soul's Hospital Association, a Catholic hospital chain.

In 1889, Revere was among the founders of the Sons of the American Revolution, later becoming its state treasurer and national Vice-President General. Circa 1898, he was the president of the Morristown Improvement Association. Revere's other memberships included the Sons of Union Veterans of the Civil War; Washington Association of New Jersey; the Aztec Club of 1847's hereditary society; and the New York branch of a Reform Club. He served as president of the Morris County Golf Club, and Morris County Gun Club.

== Early life ==
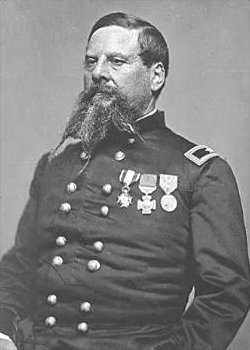
Revere's father was artist, Navy officer, and Union general Joseph Warren Revere.

On September 28, 1856, Paul Revere was born in Morristown, New Jersey to Rosanna Duncan Lamb Revere and Joseph Warren Revere. His siblings were John Revere (1844-1849), Frances Jane Revere (1849-1859), Thomas Duncan Revere (1853-1856), and Augustus Lefebvre Revere (1861 – 1910). Only Paul and Augustus survived to adulthood. Revere's great grandfather was Paul Revere, for whom he was named.

Revere studied at a Morristown private classical school. Afterwards, he studied at Harvard Law in Cambridge, Massachusetts.

== Career ==
In his youth, he read law in the office of Hon. Staats S. Morris of Newark (possibly a descendant of Staats L. Morris). He performed the same work at former New Jersey governor Joseph D. Bedle's Jersey City law office.

In February 1881, Revere was admitted to the bar, officially becoming a lawyer. He practiced law as Revere & Randolph, in collaboration with Carman Fitz Randolph, fellow lawyer and author.

By 1885, he pursued other business interests and "put aside the law." He became a manager of the Morris County Savings Bank, a director and official of the Morris County Mortgage and Realty Company, and a founder and director of the Morristown Trust Company.

== Civic leadership ==
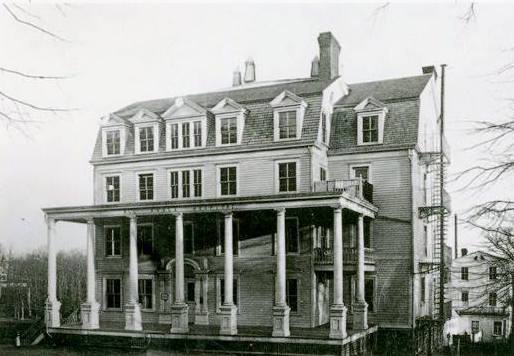
Revere was the founding chairman of the All Souls' Hospital of Morristown, established in 1891.

Starting in 1880, Revere became involved in the Democratic party, becoming chairman of multiple conventions and public meetings. For example, he was president of the Morristown Democratic Club. In 1896, he supported Palmer and Buckner. From 1880 to 1899 he delivered a speech for almost every election, being contemporaneously described as an "entertaining, logical, and forceful speaker."

From 1883 to 1885, he served on the common council of Morristown, and he did so again from 1888 to 1890.

Like his father, who converted to Catholicism during the Civil War, Paul Revere converted to Catholicism as a "young man," some time before 1891.

In 1891, Revere and his brother Augustus Lefebvre Revere joined the Washington Association of New Jersey.

In 1891, Revere became the founding chairman and president of the All Souls' Hospital Association, a Catholic hospital chain. The Association was headquartered at Morristown with branches throughout various parishes, each of which was represented on the Board of Management. Its Morristown location was in the historic Arnold's Tavern, which had been moved from the Morristown Green to serve as a hospital. The hospital's goal was to "care [for] the diseased, disabled, and infirm, and [other such] charitable work." On December 18, 1891, the All-Soul's Hospital opened. On January 4, 1892, a constitution and set of by-laws were discussed by Revere and others in a general meeting in Bayley Hall, Morristown.

For three unspecified years, he was the foreman of the Morristown fire wardens. He was also the first captain of the General George G. Meade Camp of the Sons of Veterans.

In March 1898, as the president/chair of the Morristown Improvement Association, Revere announced that his association was in opposition to street railroad legislation (i.e. trolleys).

== Death and legacy ==
The New Jersey Law Journal reported that Revere died suddenly at his Morristown home on November 10, 1901, at the age of 45. He was survived by his brother, Augustus LeFebvre Revere, and his mother, Rosanna Duncan Lamb Revere.

On November 11, 1901, The New York Times reported that Revere's funeral would be held on November 12 at Morristown's Church of the Ascension at 11 AM. It requested that "Boston papers please copy." It is possible that "Ascension" was a typo for "Assumption;" the church would likely have been Morristown's Church of the Assumption of the Blessed Virgin Mary, the church Revere's family attended and for which his father had created a painting.
