= Thomas A. Alexander =

American politician

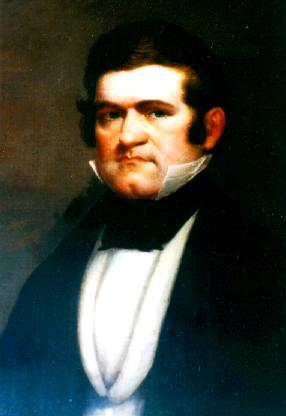

4th Mayor of Jersey City
- In office April 1842 – April 1843
- Preceded by: Dudley S. Gregory
- Succeeded by: Peter Bentley, Sr.

Personal details
- Born: 1799 Pennsylvania, U.S.
- Died: March 29, 1866 (aged 67) Bergen Township, New Jersey, U.S.
- Children: Jas. A. Alexander

Thomas A. Alexander (1800 – March 29, 1866) was the fourth mayor of Jersey City in New Jersey. He succeeded Dudley S. Gregory. He served a single one-year term from April 1842 to April 1843. He was succeeded by Peter Bentley, Sr.

== Biography ==
Born in Pennsylvania, he moved to Harsimus (now a section of Jersey City). Outside of his term as mayor, he worked as an insurance underwriter. He died in Bergen Township (now a part of Jersey City) at age 67. The funeral was held at St. Matthew's Episcopal Church in Jersey City.
