= Joseph Warren Revere (general) =

American military officer (1812–1880)

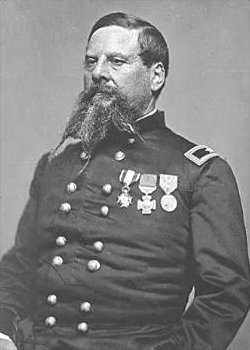
- Born: May 17, 1812; Boston, Massachusetts, US
- Died: April 20, 1880 (aged 67); Hoboken, New Jersey, US
- Burial place: Holy Rood Catholic Cemetery, Morristown, New Jersey
- Children: John Revere (November 26, 1844 - March 26, 1849); Frances Jane Revere (March 26, 1849 - September 25, 1859); Thomas Duncan Revere (November 22, 1853 - September 18, 1856); Paul Revere (September 28, 1856 - 1901); Augustus Lefebvre Revere (August 8, 1861 - 1910)
- Military career
- Allegiance: United States of America; Mexico
- Branch: United States Navy; Mexican Army; United States Army; Union Army
- Service years: 1828–1850 (US Navy); 1850–1852 (Mexican Army); 1861–1863 (US Army)
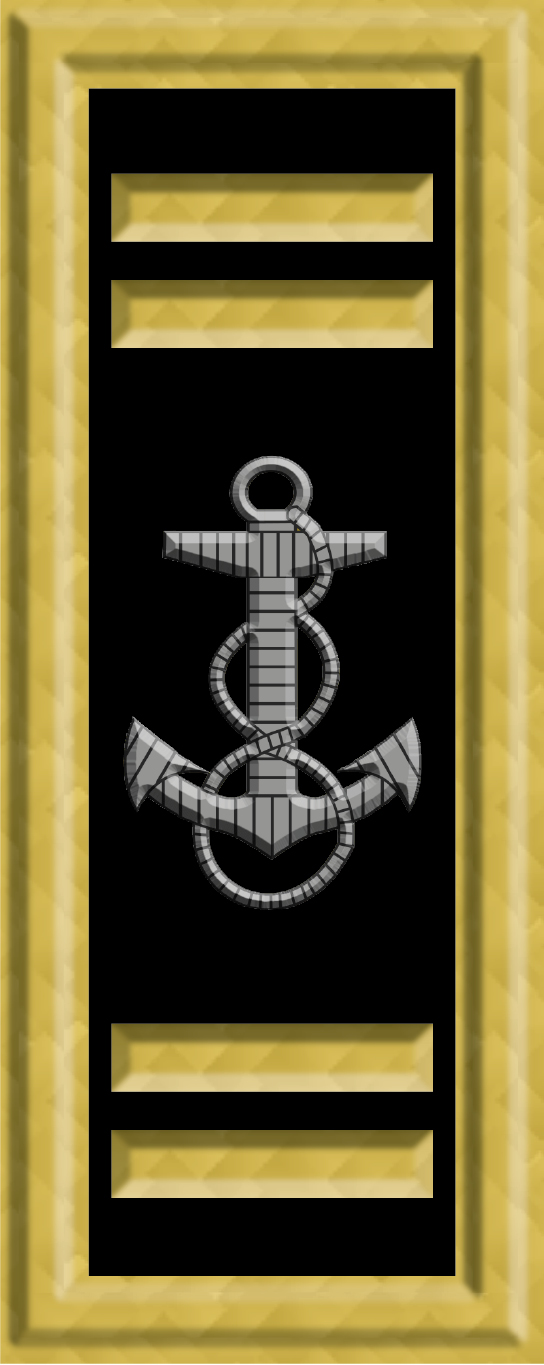
- Rank: Lieutenant (USN); Colonel (Mexico); Brigadier General (USV); Brevet Major General (USV)
- Unit: USS Constitution
- Commands: 7th New Jersey Infantry Regiment; Excelsior Brigade
- Conflicts: Second Seminole War; Mexican–American War; Indian Rebellion of 1857 (Note: Private Observer.); Second Italian War of Independence (Note: Private Observer.); American Civil War
- Awards: Order of Isabella the Catholic

Signature
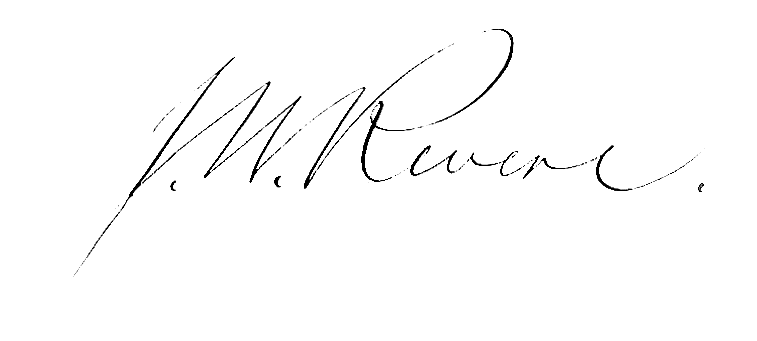

Joseph Warren Revere (May 17, 1812 – April 20, 1880) was a career United States Navy and Army officer. He was the grandson of American Revolutionary War figure Paul Revere.

He was an amateur artist and autobiographer, publishing two novels: A Tour of Duty in California (1849) and Keel and Saddle (1872). Both novels include memoirs of his experience traveling in the military. He was involved in the African Slave Trade Patrol, the Second Seminole War, the Mexican-American War, and the Civil War.

He was heavily involved in the 1846-1847 Conquest of California, wherein American troops invaded Alta California. Afterwards, he created a plantation in Rancho San Geronimo (near San Francisco, California), which used forced labor of Coast Miwok workers.

During the American Civil War, Revere was a Union brigadier general who was court-martialed after the 1863 Battle of Chancellorsville. Revere challenged the court-martial and published multiple pamphlets in attempts to clear his reputation. In 1862, during the Civil War, Revere converted to Catholicism.

He completed several tours of duty, during which he travelled to Mexico, Cuba, Liberia, France, Germany, Greece, Egypt, Portugal, Spain, Algeria, and Italy.

His 1854 Gothic Revival mansion is historically preserved for educational tours at Fosterfields Living Historical Farm in Morristown, New Jersey.

== Early life and naval career ==
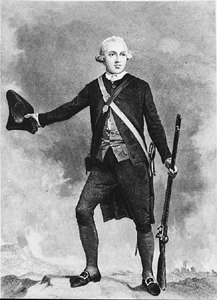
General Joseph Warren, Joseph Warren Revere's namesake

Joseph Warren Revere was born in Boston, Massachusetts on May 17, 1812 to Lydia LeBaron Goodwin and Dr. John Revere; he was a grandson of Paul Revere. The Reveres descended from a French Huguenot family. He was named after General Joseph Warren, the famous doctor and general in the American Revolution, who was a close friend of his grandfather.

In 1826, the fourteen-year-old Revere joined the United States Naval School in New York. Two years later, Revere joined the United States Navy as a midshipman. His 25 years of tours of duty took him to Europe, the Pacific, and the Baltic States. He travelled to Singapore and met Czar Nicholas I of Russia. He was a polyglot, which aided him in his expeditions.

Some time in the 1830s, Revere fought to annex Florida during the Second Seminole War, on a mosquito fleet near Florida's coast. He afterwards commanded an anti-piracy fleet in the West Indies. Revere was present in Spain for one of the Carlist Wars.

Between 1835 and 1845, he was aboard the frigate USS Constitution.

In 1837, he met Rosanna Duncan Lamb in Boston. They both had grandparents who were soldiers during the American Revolution. The courtship would be delayed due to Revere joining the United States Exploring Expedition in 1838, the first American squadron to circumnavigate the globe. He rejoined Lamb in 1840 for a brief time, before returning to the expedition. By 1841, Revere was promoted to lieutenant. In an unknown year, Revere reportedly saved the British HMS Ganges from shipwreck, for which Revere was "presented with a sword of honor by the governor-general of India."

On October 4, 1842, Rosanna Duncan Lamb (April 16, 1818 - July 26, 1910) married Joseph Warren Revere in Boston. They had 5 children, although the first 3 died during childhood: John Revere (1844–1849), Frances Jane Revere (1849–1859), and Thomas Duncan Revere (1853–1856). The youngest two were lawyer Paul Revere (1856–1901) and banker Augustus Lefebvre Revere (1861–1910), who both lived through adulthood.

In 1846, Revere was deeply involved in the American Conquest of California, part of the Mexican-American War. On June 15, 1846, a small group of immigrant American settlers captured the small Mexican garrison at Sonoma, declared the independence of California from Mexico by proclaiming the California Republic, and raised the Bear Flag. On the morning of July 9, 1846, 70 U.S. naval troops arrived at Yerba Buena (San Francisco), lowered the Bear Flag in Portsmouth Square, and raised the American flag in its place. Later that day, Revere repeated the flag replacement at Sonoma. This ended the brief 25-day existence of the California Republic, which had controlled a localized area in and around San Francisco.

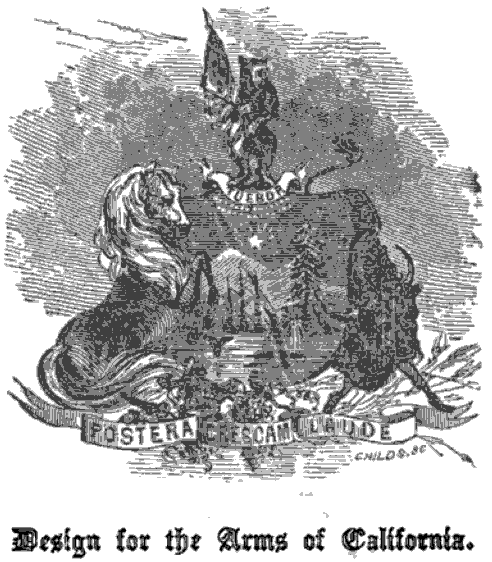
Revere's 1849 proposal for the Great Seal of California

In 1846, Revere patented Rancho San Geronimo, 8,701 acres of land seized during the Mexican-American War. Revere created a plantation at Rancho San Geronimo, introducing potatoes to the area and selling timber. According to the Sonoma Museum, Revere enslaved Coast Miwok people, native to the Marin County area, and used their "forced...labor" to operate the plantation. However, two months later, the Army transferred Revere to San Diego, and Revere "is said to have left the property in the care of a Native-American [presumably Coast Miwok] foreman."

Circa 1847, Revere continued to invade Mexican territory in the Mexican–American War. He was commended for his bravery in battle.

=== A Tour of Duty in California ===
In 1849, Rosanna Revere gave birth to Frances Jane Revere. The same year, Revere published his first autobiographical book, titled A Tour of Duty in California: Including a Description of the Gold Region: and an Account of the Voyage Around Cape Horn; with Notices of Lower California, the Gulf and Pacific Coasts, and the Principal Events Attending the Conquest of the Californias. It was edited by Joseph N. Balestier, a U.S. consul of Southeast Asia, who was his uncle by marriage, though Balestier refers to Revere as "my friend" in the foreword. The book includes illustrations and lithographs by Revere as well as his original submission for the Great Seal of California. Revere dedicated the book to John Y. Mason, secretary of the Navy 1844–1849, stating "[his] able and upright discharge of his public duties has won for him the respect and applause of his countrymen." The memoir was advertised in the Boston Evening Transcript, the Charleston Courier, the Baltimore Sun, The Living Age, The United States Democratic Review, and the Richmond Enquirer. The Boston Evening Transcript heralded the novel for vividly describing California as "the new land of promise."

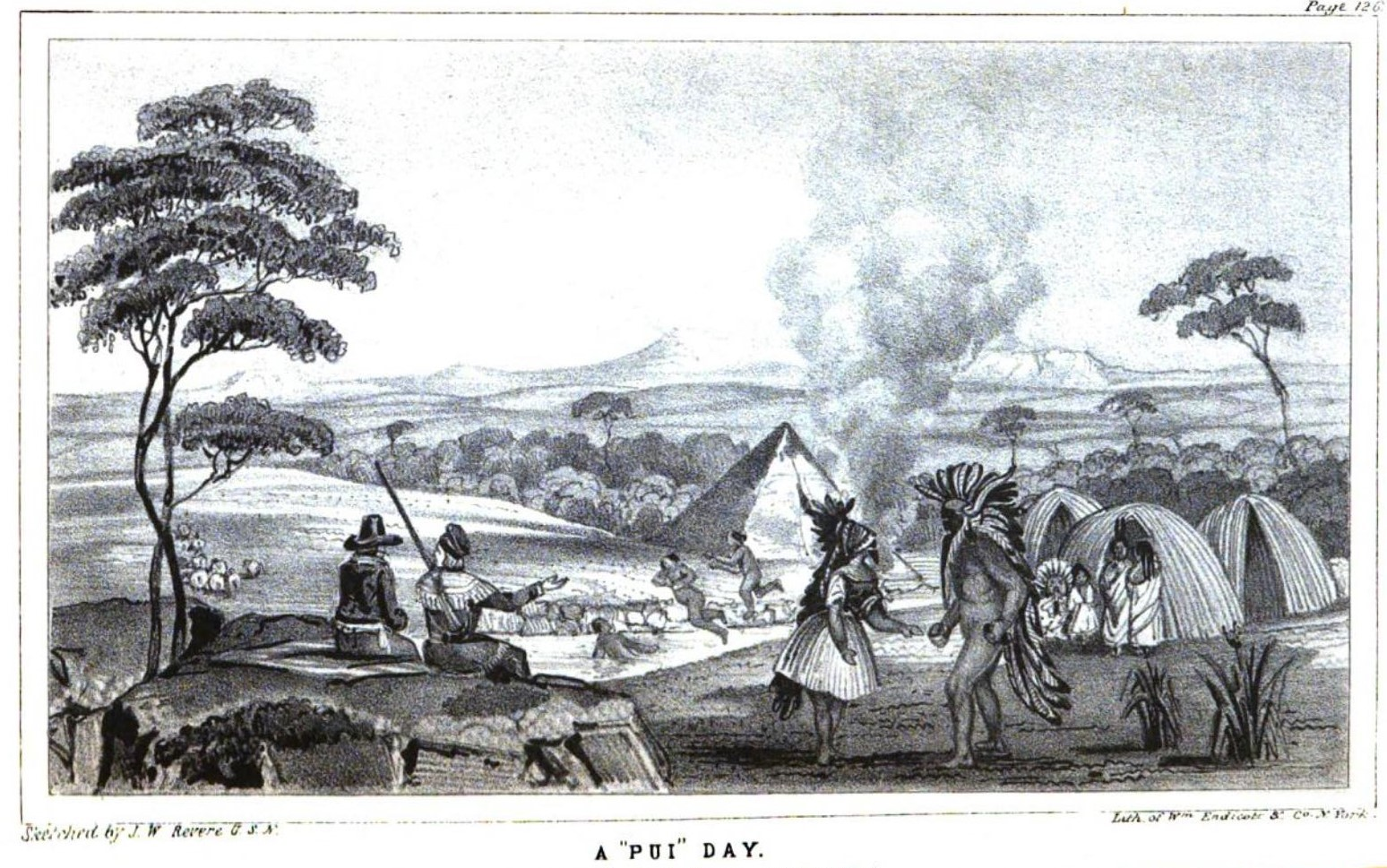
Revere's 1849 illustration of a Pui Day (Feast Day) he attended near Monterey, California - possibly Rumsen Ohlone.

While living on the Rancho in California, Revere befriended Irish immigrant Timothy "Old Tim" Murphy. Revere states, "I have often hunted [deer] with Don Timoleo Murphy and his pack of [grey]hounds, and a more gallant sport cannot be found in the wide world." Although he lived alongside Californios and Native tribes of California, Revere scorned their customs, referring to them as "the most wretched of mankind." After attending a Pui Day (Feast Day), Revere states,

Like most savages, [the Indians of California] reason with a rude but true philosophy, that the loss of a life so hard and precarious as theirs is little to be regretted...To give them civil rights, on an equality with the whites, would be more absurd than to grant such rights to children under ten years of age...When it is remembered, that small-pox is not the only desolating disease which follows in the wake of the white man, and that his rum has proved among our Indians as fatal as his natural disorders, it is very clear, that unless measures be promptly taken to protect and preserve the inoffensive natives of California, the present generation will live to read the epitaph of the whole race.

In A Tour of Duty, Revere also demonstrates his support of Manifest destiny: he states that the "Anglo-Saxon race...seems destined to possess the whole of the North American Continent."

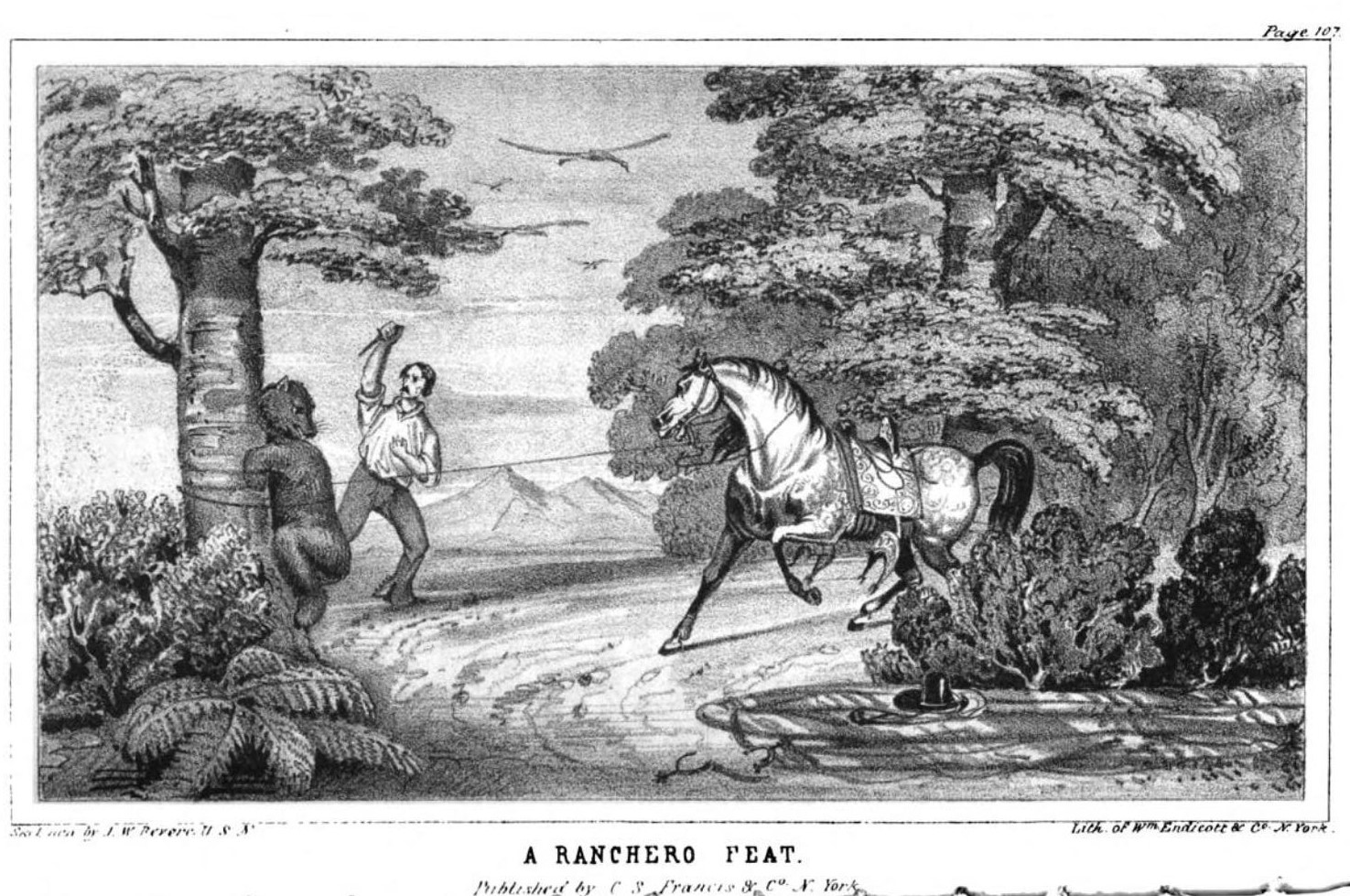
Revere's illustration of a Ranchero (Rancho owner) capturing a bear, possibly a metaphor for the 1847 Conquest of California

Circa 1849, Revere's close friend Rodman Price visited Revere's Rancho San Geronimo plantation and was impressed. On December 28, 1849, Price paid Revere $7,500 to purchase half the land, with $2,500 up front. The two also agreed to split the profits of timber exports from the property.

== Possible affair ==
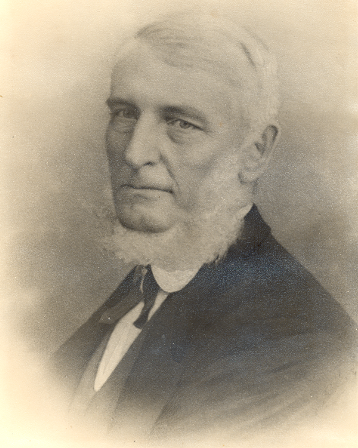
James G. Sawkins took Revere to a Naval Court of Inquiry due to Revere's possible affair with his wife, Octavia Sawkins

Circa 1849, Revere temporarily received housing in San Rafael, California (although he had his own Rancho at this point). The landlord was British geologist and artist James Gay Sawkins, then the husband of Octavia "Rosa" Sawkins, a British teacher raised in the West Indies.

Witnesses described seeing Sawkins and Revere sitting together on a hammock, frequently meeting in Sawkins's room, and visiting the house of Chapita Miranda together (described during the court proceeding as "a house of ill fame," "an improper place").

On November 26, 1849, James Sawkins entered his home and greeted Revere with a handshake, noticing he was "trembling and cold." Sawkins testified:

Entering my wife's room, she was sitting in a rocking chair with her head inclined down. Putting my hand on her table I asked her what was the matter. That she received with an expression of countenance I never saw her before. "James, I am no longer your wife; don't come near me; don't touch me; hate me, for I hate you. I will never live with you again."

James said he ran to a nearby Mr. Murphy and asked what had happened. He claimed Mr. Murphy led him to the veranda and said, "Chloroform or some damnable drug has been given to your poor wife." When James found that the laudanum bottle in the medicine cabinet was empty, he asked his wife what became of it and she said she drank it, i.e. attempted suicide. James Sawkins "became alarmed for her mind," because he recalled her mother had also had some type of psychosis.

The next morning, Rosa did not allow James to force her into her room, leading to a physical altercation in which both fell to the ground. Rosa left the home. James and Revere set out via horseback to find her, but did not succeed. They searched again at dawn.

Three days later, James led a search party into the woods, where a carman informed James that Rosa had escaped to Pacheco, California. James brought Rosa back to the house and promised to get her a lawyer so that a divorce could be filed.

The following day, James began to suspect that Rosa Sawkins and Revere had had an affair. Rosa asked James not to injure Revere, blaming herself for her actions and mental health.

A Naval Board of Inquiry composed of officer James Glynn, officer Charles W. Pickering, and judge William E. Levy convened on the USS Warren to "inquire into the truth of the serious allegations" against Revere. He was charged with "having deprived Mr. James G. Sawkins of his wife," Rosa Sawkins.

James Sawkins claimed that Rosa Sawkins said,

I gave myself up to Revere, what passed I scarcely know, but remorse was too great to bear. I flew to the Laudinum bottle and emptied it at one draught in the hopes of killing myself. Oh, that I had died, but now I love him; yes, James, to the bottom of my soul and I will live for him alone.

The court case was complicated by the discovery that James G. Sawkins had another wife whom he married at the age of 18 while she was 35, and the couple had two daughters.

Rosa Sawkins was denied work as a teacher as a result of the case.

On May 20, 1850, Revere wrote a letter to the U.S. Department of the Navy objecting to the allegations made by the court of inquiry. The Navy replied that Revere's objections were "well founded."

On July 1, 1850, Revere wrote his letter of resignation from the Navy after almost twenty years of service. This may have been to prevent himself from being officially court-martialed, which would increase popularity of the incident. He did not describe the affair and subsequent proceedings in 1872 biographical novel Keel and Saddle, claiming instead that he resigned due to lack of promotion opportunities. He later was court-martialed during the Civil War for different reasons.

== Later career ==
On August 6, 1851, Price bought the remainder of Revere's property for $8,000. The same year, Revere formed a coastal trading business with Sandy McGregor, for which they purchased La Golondrina, a ship built in Spain that could hold a crew of 25. Revere and McGregor presumably headed the crew.

Revere joined the Mexican Army with the rank of colonel. He was ordered to reorganize the Mexican Artillery Corps and was honored by the Spanish and Mexican Governments.

In 1851, La Golondrina encountered a beached Spanish ship off the coast of Mexico, which was under siege by Native Mexicans. Revere and McGregor fought and possibly murdered the Mexican attackers allowing the Spanish "crew of seventeen men and one woman" to escape. For this deed, Queen Isabella II knighted Revere in the Order of Isabella the Catholic in 1851. Soon afterward, Revere and McGregor dissolved their partnership and sold the vessel "to a group of Englishmen hoping to find gold in Australia."

He visited Mexico City to meet with Mariano Arista, the president of Second Federal Republic of Mexico from 1851 to 1853. Arista offered Revere "a commission as Lieutenant Colonel of Artillery in the Mexican Army." Revere accepted and reorganized the artillery and trained officers. However, after multiple revolts, Arista resigned and was exiled from the country, prompting Revere to quit the position and move to Morristown, New Jersey.

== First retirement ==
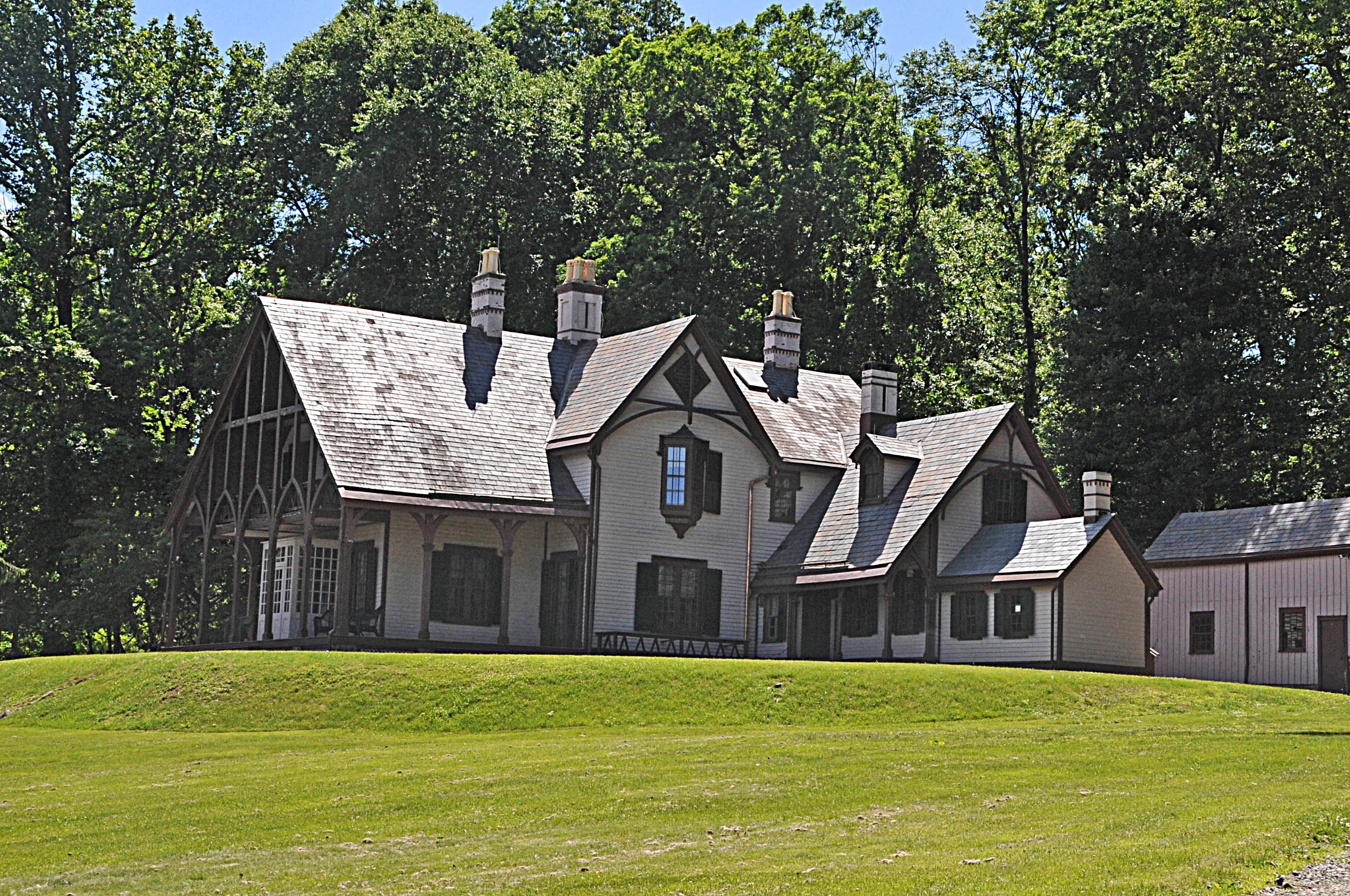
Joseph W. Revere House, Fosterfields Living Historical Farm, Morris Township, New Jersey

In 1852, Revere retired to Morristown, New Jersey; he purchased the Ogden farmhouse and the 88 acres of farmland surrounding it. Once the land was his, he contracted local master carpenter Ashbel Bruen of Chatham to construct a unique mansion on the hill, which Revere helped design. His customized mansion, titled The Willows, was designed in the Gothic Revival style (specifically, Carpenter Gothic). Revere and Bruen likely based their design on the 1849 Olmstead House, designed by British architect Gervase Wheeler, the pattern of which appeared in the book Rural Homes of 1851.

Construction was complete in 1854, when Revere moved in. In the dining room, Revere likely painted the elaborate trompe-l'œil murals of still lives, the Revere family crest, and a bouquet of baguettes. Above his family crest, he painted Thomas Ken's 1674 doxology, "Praise God from whom all blessings flow," often sung to the tune of the Old 100th.

The home was historically preserved by Caroline Foster, who bequeathed it to the Morris County Park System in 1979. It is now part of the Fosterfields Living Historical Farm, where guests can attend tours of the home.

The years 1857 and 1858 found Revere touring Europe where he claimed to have served as "a military consultant for numerous governments." with his friend, Union army general Phil Kearny. Revere also went to India, where the United Kingdom awarded him the Indian Mutiny Medal for helping suppress the Indian Rebellion of 1857–58.

On September 25, 1859, Frances Jane Revere died at the age of 10 of pneumonia. The family was "grief stricken" and travelled to Europe in November, coming back the following year. Possibly during this time, Revere was present at the Battle of Sulferino during the Second Italian War of Independence.

== Civil War service ==
In 1852, while on a steamboat in Mississippi, Revere discussed astrology with Stonewall Jackson, who was a deep believer of the subject. Though Revere was skeptical, he provided Jackson "the necessary data for calculating a horoscope; and in the course of a few months, [he] received from him a letter, which [he] preserved, enclosing a scheme of [Revere's] nativity." Jackson predicted a "culmination of the malign aspect" in the first days of May 1863. This would align with the Battle of Chancellorsville on May 3, 1863, the battle that led to Revere's court-martial.

Revere returned to the US in 1860. When the Civil War began in 1861, Revere tried to join the Union Navy but was informed that there were no officer slots available for him. Having been appointed as head of the New Jersey Militia during the governorship of Rodman Price, Revere decided to enlist in the Union Army.

In 1861, Revere accepted a commission as Colonel of the 7th New Jersey Volunteer Infantry. He led it into the Peninsula Campaign and the Seven Days Battle. During the Peninsula campaign, Revere's regiment suffered many deaths, and he contracted rheumatic fever.

In August 1862, Revere fought at the Second Battle of Bull Run. The Union Army commended him for his bravery, but "the brutality he encountered left Revere badly shaken." During this battle, he received a wound that severely damaged his right leg, leading to difficulty walking. Afterwards, Revere went to Washington, D.C., while Union troops regrouped. While there, he entered an unspecified Catholic church and felt "the impulse, or rather inspiration, to become a Catholic."

In October 1862, Joseph Revere was promoted to brigadier general of U.S. Volunteers.

On October 19, 1862, Revere was baptized at the Baltimore Basilica in Maryland by Reverend H. B. Coskery. This was followed by Revere's first Holy Communion on October 26 of that year. Years later, Archbishop Bayley (possibly James Roosevelt Bayley) confirmed Revere in Morristown's Assumption of the Blessed Virgin Mary parish. He created a painting for the parish: the "Espousals of the Blessed Virgin and St. Joseph," which as of 2012 continues to be on display in Assumption of the Blessed Virgin Mary Church.

In December 1862, in the Battle of Fredericksburg, he led a brigade but saw little action. He was later named to command the Excelsior Brigade.

=== Court-martial ===
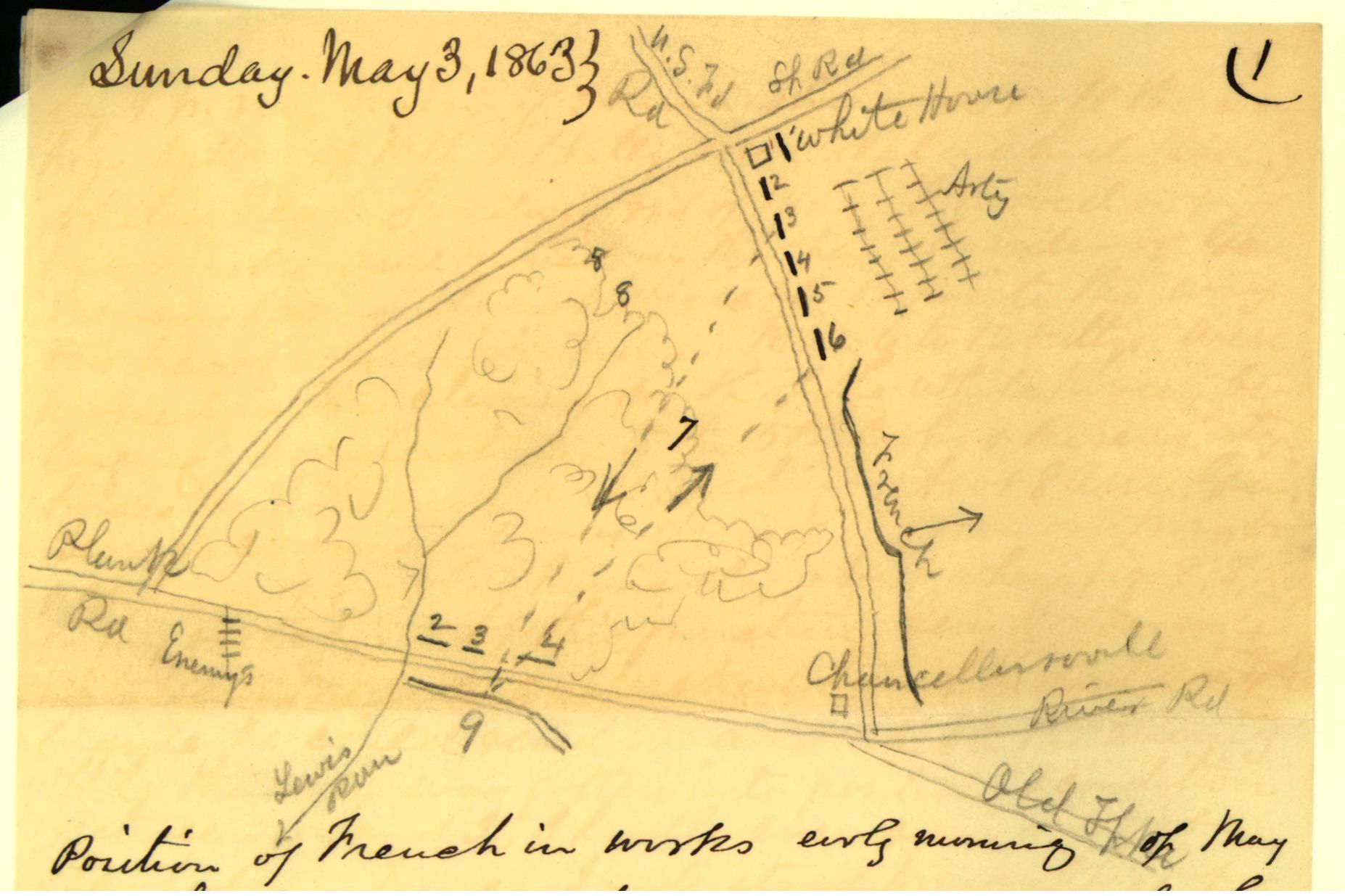
Gen. Carroll's Chancellorsville battle plan for May 3rd, 1863, the day of Revere's inculpatory retreat

Revere's most personally challenging moment of his Civil War career came after the Battle of Chancellorsville when blame was being assigned for the Union Army's loss. Revere was court-martialed due to an event occurring on May 3, 1863. A letter c. 1863 summarizes the incident:

Brigadier General Revere was convicted by Court-martial and dismissed, for marching his command, without orders from his superior officer, to about three miles from the scene of action and towards the United States Ford; but by direction of the President this dismissal was revoked, and General Revere's resignation was accepted.

On the morning of May 3, 1863, near Falmouth, Virginia, division commander Maj. Gen. Hiram Berry was mortally wounded after charging the Confederate line. Next in seniority was General Mott, who was severely wounded; therefore, Revere assumed command of the group. As the battle lacked a clear front line, Revere commanded his troops (the Army of the Potomac) to reform at a point set by compass. This three-mile march, described by Revere as a "regrouping effort" and not a retreat, led to his being court-martialed as ordered by General Joseph Hooker.

Revere claims he was censured for "cowardice on the field," a claim which makes him smile due to its "flagrant vindictiveness."

From Revere's perspective, he writes,

I heard...of the death of General Berry, my division commander, who was killed at about half-past seven o'clock; and immediately afterwards I met Brigadier-General Mott, the next in seniority in the division, going to the rear, severely wounded. I at once concluded that I was the commanding officer of the Second Division, Third Corps...

The need of some action was urgent. I believed myself to be the division commander...My men were worn with the marches and battles of four days, with want of rest and food for the last twenty-four hours, and with sharp fighting for the last four, and were nearly out of ammunition...I [was] sensible of the responsibility involved, but confident that it was the only course for bringing my troops speedily into efficient service...

To sum up all in a few words,—after the fight was ended, left without orders, and crowded off the field, I led away a handful of worn and disorganized men towards a point where, in my belief, an action might even then be going on, and brought them back within six hours, after retiring less than three miles, two thousand strong, refreshed and resupplied. Was this a breach of duty?

On August 10, 1863, Revere was tried by court-martial and dismissed from the army.

Cover of Revere's 1863 "Statement" pamphlet, written to defend himself from allegations of cowardice

=== Pamphlets ===
In September 1863, while living in The Willows, Revere wrote a 48-page pamphlet admonishing his court-martial and defending his reputation. It was titled "A Statement of the case of Brigadier-General Joseph W. Revere, United States Volunteers: tried by court-martial, and dismissed from the service of the United States, August 10th, 1863."

It included "a Map, a copy of the record of the Trial, and an appendix." The pamphlet had a marbled cover and was addressed to the public hoping they will "acquit him of the censure cast upon him by the court." Revere included footnotes from Stephen Vincent Benét's 1862 "A Treatise on Military Law and the Practise of Courts-Martials." Letters from different personnel about the situation are collected in the appendix. It was published by electrotyper and printer C. A. Alvord on 15 Vandewater Street in Farmingdale, New York.

In "A Statement," Revere insinuates that the court-martial does not consider his decades of prior experience:

I have been for thirty years a sailor and a soldier. Had I been a politician in epaulettes, plying in the camp the arts of the caucus...there might be retributive, though indirect, justice in this sentence. But I have been more versed in war than in intrigue. On all that Court, eminent as most of its members were, there was not one who was not my junior in length of employment in the United States service...At least, with such a record, I had a right to expect from the Court, even with my defence [sic] unheard, greater lenity than is shown in this cruel sentence...

In 1863, General J. Egbert Farnum defended Revere's reputation in a letter, concluding with, "[F]or the careless and inconsiderate slanders that have been circulated [in New York City newspapers], affecting you as a brave man, and an honorable soldier, I am with you responsible." 7 others signed the letter endorsing Farnum's testament. In 1864, J. H. Eastburn's Press in Boston published Revere's second pamphlet titled "A Review of the case of Brigadier-Gen. Joseph W. Revere, U.S. Volunteers, tried by court-martial and dismissed from the service of the United States, August 10, 1863." The pamphlet is written in third-person and does not specify its author, but it is nevertheless credited to Revere. In the pamphlet's conclusion, the author uses Socratic questioning to imply that Joseph Hooker made larger mistakes than Revere without repercussions, and the last line invokes a quote from Act II Scene II of Shakespeare's 1604 play, Measure for Measure:

Why should charges be preferred against Revere for "neglect of duty, &c.," in leaving on the field the arms of the killed and wounded, and wasting ammunition fired at the enemy by his command, and why should Hooker get off unscathed, after having, the very next day, ingloriously abandoned the same field, in presence of an inferior force of rebels, in opposition to all his generals in conucil [sic], except the Mephistophiles [sic] of these proceedings, leaving not only arms, equipments, and ammunition, but immense stores of all kinds for Lee's especial delectation, and his wounded to the care of the rebel surgeons? Is the typical sword of military justice two edged and cutting both ways, or does Will Shakspeare [sic] say truly - "That in the officer's but a choloric [sic] word, / Which in the soldier is rank heresy." ?

In 1864, Revere's supporters submitted letters and petitions to Lincoln, urging him to undo the dishonorable court-martial. These included Nehemiah Perry, George Middleton, and William G. Steele; they sent a petition on January 29, 1864, stating they felt "the judgement of the court martial in the case of Brig. Gen. Revere, has been rendered upon a mistaken state of facts and that the service of the government would be greatly advanced by his reinstatement into the service."

In January 1865, he wrote a pamphlet titled "Sequel to the Statement," presumably a sequel to his 1863 pamphlet.

President Abraham Lincoln overturned the court's ruling and reinstated Revere but accepted Revere's resignation at the same time. As a lifelong member of the Democratic Party, that was probably the best deal Revere could expect from a Republican administration. In response to this situation, Revere was voted the honor of the rank of Brevet Major General by the United States Congress in 1866.

== Postbellum career and death ==
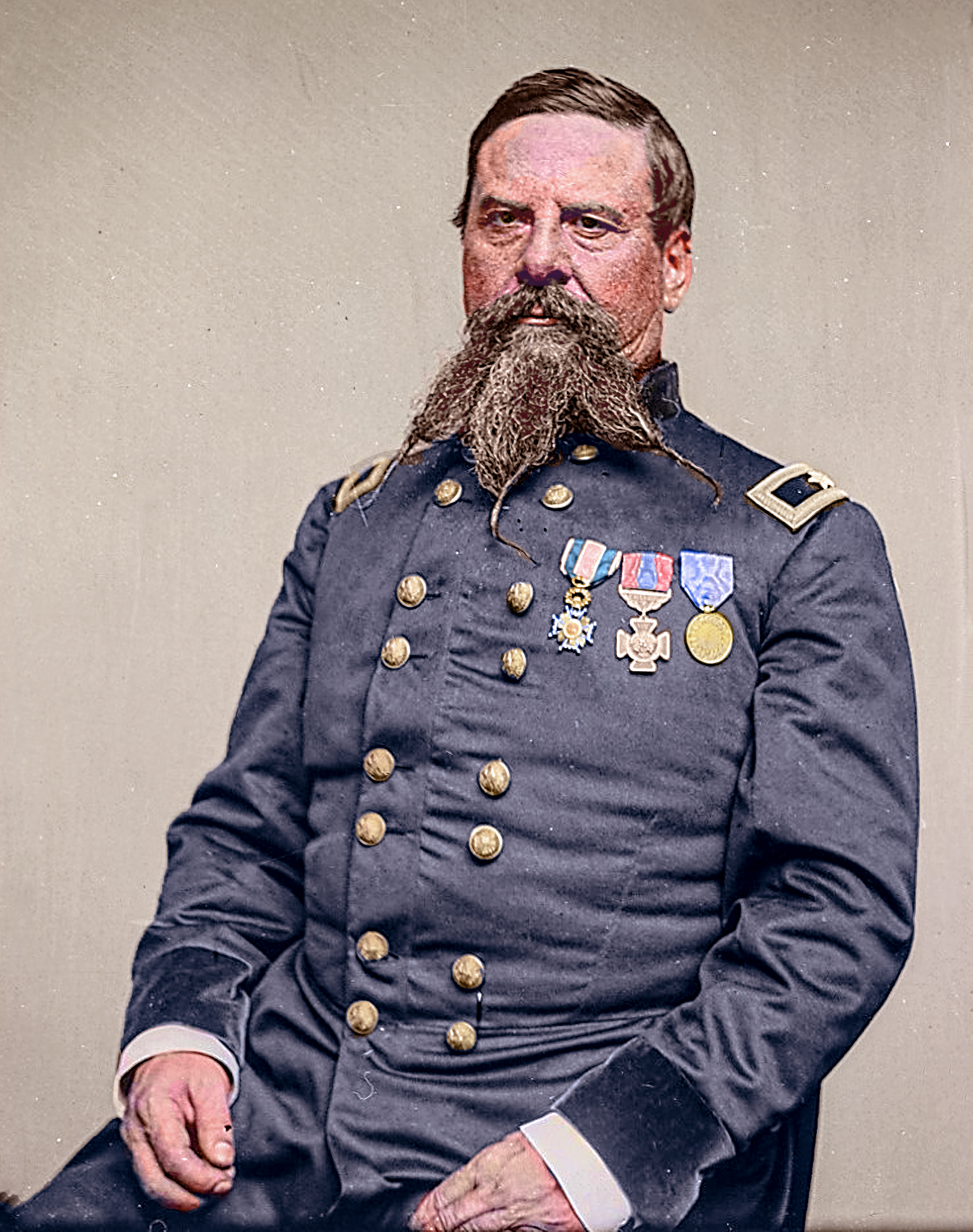
A colorized photograph of Joseph Warren Revere circa 1860–1865, likely during the Civil War

On May 30, 1865, Revere's pension was approved for $20 a month. Revere had applied as a wounded veteran. Around this time, he had difficulty walking due to his right leg injury at the 1862 Second Battle of Bull Run.

On August 3, 1866, surgeon Dr. Lewis Fisher examined Revere, who stated he was "totally incapacitated for obtaining his subsistence by manual labor." This raised Revere's pension to $30.

After his resignation, Revere began traveling the globe and continued writing autobiographies, but his health had been affected by his Civil War service. He had suffered from a severe case of rheumatic fever during the 1862 Peninsula Campaign and had been severely wounded at the 1862 Second Battle of Bull Run.

On April 18, 1868, while farming at The Willows, Revere published a horse breeding advertisement in The Jerseyman:

Blood Will Tell. The thoroughbred Stallion Jupiter will stand this season at my place, for a limited number of mares. Jupiter is one of the best strain of blood in America, being got by the celebrated Jupiter out of Golden Fleece. A beautiful chestnut, 12 1/2 hands high, the fastest four mile horse in the State; and of great endurance and bottom, in perfect health. In order to afford the Farmers of Morris County an opportunity to refresh their stock, terms will be low; viz., $25 to insure and $12 cash for a single occasion. J. W. Revere, Mendham Road near Morristown.

In 1872, Revere's second book was published; the autobiographical Keel and Saddle: A Retrospect of 40 years of Military and Naval Service. It was published by James R. Osgood & Co. The chapters detail his military-related travels and acquaintances in countries including (chronologically) Mexico, Cuba, Liberia, France, Germany, Greece, Egypt, Portugal, Spain, Algeria, and Italy. The book is dedicated "to the memories" of Colonel Paul Joseph Revere and assistant surgeon Edward H. R. Revere, both of whom died in battle.

In 1872's Keel and Saddle, after detailing his experience freeing a ship of enslaved people, Revere wrote, "None of us could understand a word the slaves uttered: indeed, they appeared hardly to possess the organ of speech, so deeply guttural and barbarous was their uncouth dialect, - more like the chattering of baboons than any human jargon...In my opinion, extensive colonization is the only practical mode of benefiting 'benighted Africa.'"

On January 9, 1873, a secretary to President Grant wrote the following letter to Revere concerning his book:

Sir:

The President directs me to acknowledge the receipt of and to express to you his thanks for the copy of "Keel and Saddle" you were kind enough to send him.

I am, Sir,

Your humble svt.,

[Unintelligible] Secretary

In 1875, while touring near Vienne in southeast France, by chance he visited the ruined chateau of his De Rivoire ancestors. He made a drawing of the coat of arms, Argent three fesses Gules, overall on a bend Azure three fleur-de-lis Or, from which he derived his differenced arms, displayed on his grave marker as Argent 'two' fesses Gules, overall on a bend Azure three flour-de-lis 'palewise' Or.

=== Health decline and death ===
Circa the 1870s, a posthumous biography claims Revere's health was "completely shattered by wounds and diseases incurred in service and his existence became one of unbroken suffering."

From 1871 to 1880, the Reveres rented out their Morristown mansion to multiple tenants. This is likely when Revere purchased the historic 1807 Sansay House, possibly to live closer to the center of Morristown. Tenants of his Willows estate included Charles Grant Foster (father of Caroline Foster) and author Bret Harte.

On April 15, 1880, Revere experienced "neuralgia of the heart" while on a ferry to New York (possibly a heart attack or cardiac arrest) as well as rheumatism. Friends placed him in Buck's Hotel (Note: The 1902 source states the hotel as "Buch's Hotel." No record was found of a Buch's Hotel in Hoboken, but a "Buck's Hotel" in Hoboken did exist at 68-70 York Street, Hoboken according to http://www.cityofjerseycity.org/docs/grundy.shtml, so it can be assumed that the author made a spelling error.) in Hoboken. He died five days later, on April 20, 1880, at 67 years of age. His funeral was private but "largely attended by his many friends."

His name appears, but lined through, in the June 1, 1880, U.S. Federal Census for his family in the City of Morristown, Morris County, New Jersey. Revere and his immediate family are buried at Holy Rood Cemetery in Morristown, several miles away from The Willows.

== Legacy ==
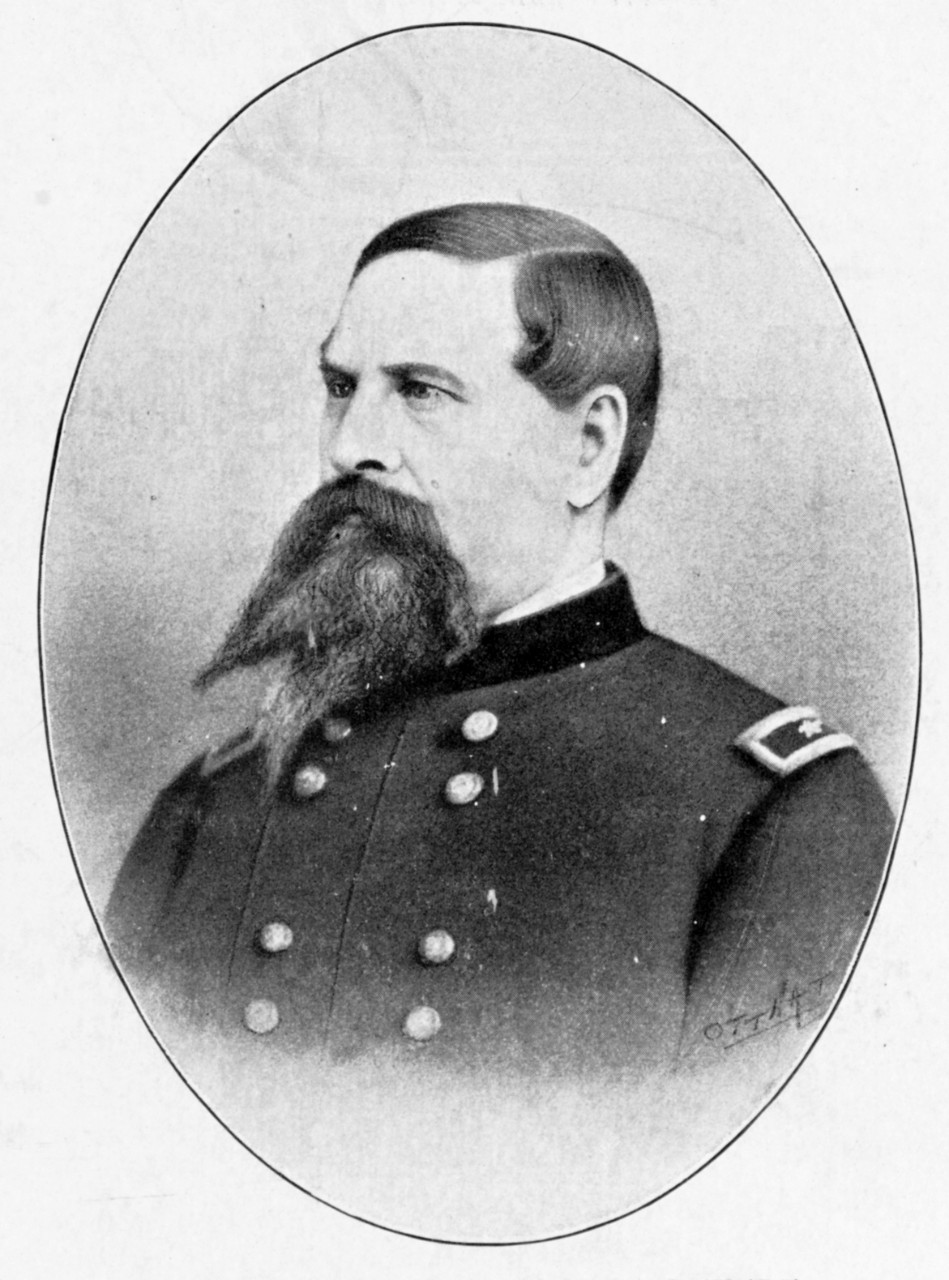
A posthumous artwork of Revere, published in 1902.

In 1881, a year after Revere's death, tenant Charles Grant Foster purchased the entire Willows property. In the decades that followed, the farm was named Fosterfields, and Foster converted it into a dairy farm breeding Jersey cattle. The Fosters kept the Revere mansion largely intact. Meanwhile, the Revere family likely continued to live in Morristown's Sansay House.

In 1888, Joseph Sabin included Revere's novels and pamphlets in Volume 17 of Bibliotheca Americana, a record of books relating to America.

On April 5, 1891, Joseph Warren Revere's wife Rosanna Duncan Revere arranged a party to organize the New Jersey Daughters of the American Revolution.

The 1914 Bear Flag Monument in Sonoma, California commemorates Revere's raising of the American flag in Sonoma on July 9, 1846. The statue depicts the American immigrants who revolted against the Mexican government in what was then Alta California.

In 1979, farm owner Caroline Rose Foster bequeathed the estate to the Morris County Parks Commission upon her death to be preserved as a "Living Historical Farm."

In 2003, William R. Chemerka, a historical interpreter and actor, portrayed Revere at a Civil War program at Fosterfields. In 2013, Chemerka published biography General Joseph Warren Revere: The Gothic Saga of Paul Revere's Grandson.

The Revere mansion, also known as "The Willows" and (in a presidential letter) "The Rancho," is available for tours seasonally. In 2019, the Revere mansion was the subject of evening ghost hunts for the public, led by Island Paranormal Society the goal being to "contact, confront, and communicate with paranormal entities." On May 7, 2022, the Willows held a grand reopening, following its closure during COVID-19.

== See also ==
- List of American Civil War generals (Union)
- Fosterfields
