= Sansay House =

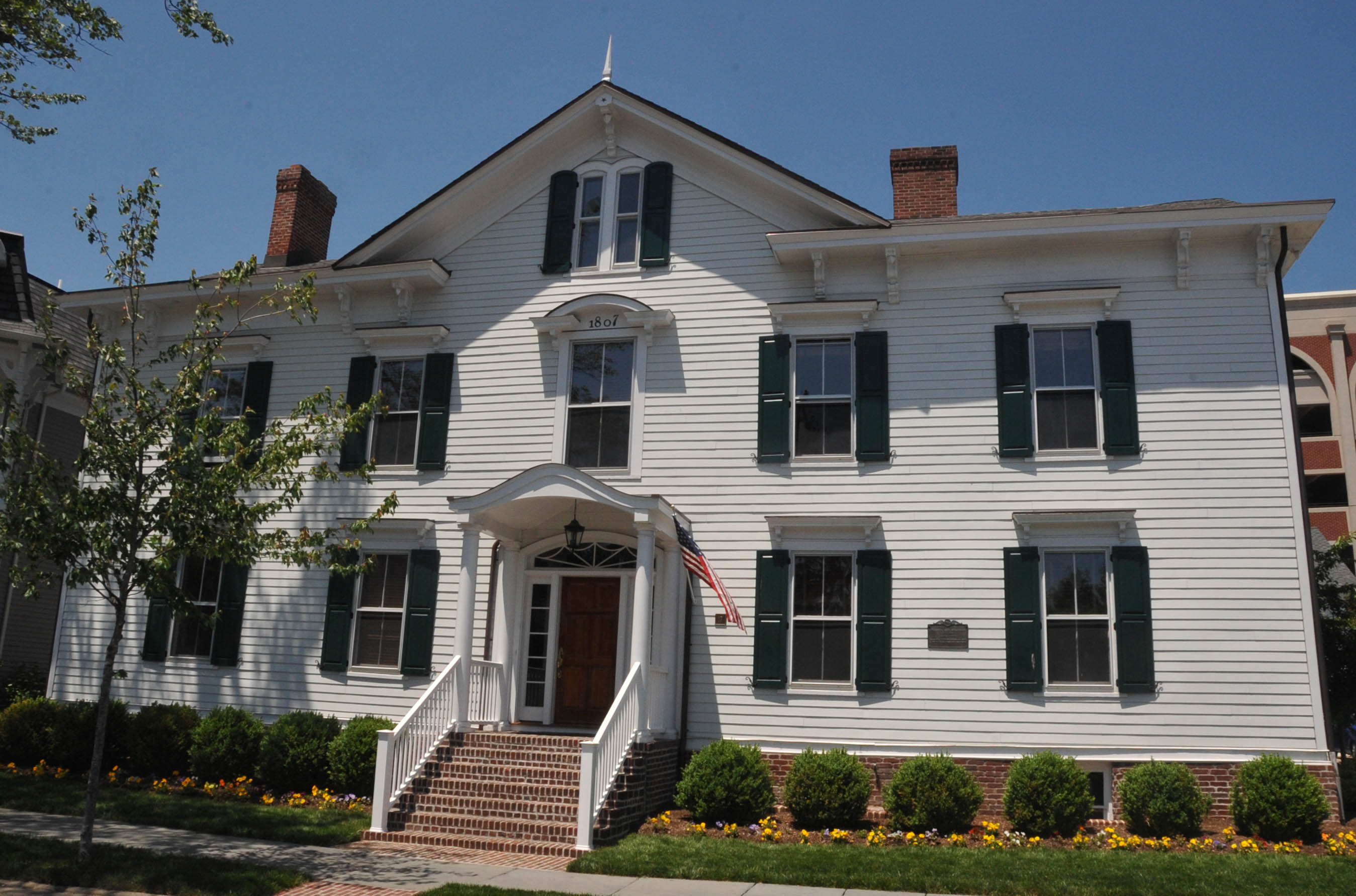
- Interactive map of the Sansay House area

General information
- Location: Morristown, New Jersey, 17 DeHart Street, United States
- Coordinates: 40.794647216796875°N 74.48170471191406°W
- Completed: 1807
- Owner: Louis Sansay; Jacob King; Joseph Warren Revere

Design and construction
- Known for: Dancing school

The Sansay House is a residential dwelling in Morristown, New Jersey. It was built in 1807. In the early 19th century, it was the site of a French dancing school led by Monsieur Louis Sansay. On July 14, 1825, Louis Sansay held a ball in Lafayette's honor. Louisa Macculloch (1785–1863) and her daughter, Mary Louisa (1804–1888) were on the decorating committee for the reception.

The dancing school lost favor and was eventually closed in the 19th century following Presbyterian Reverend Albert Barnes's sermons against Louis Sansay's character and the perceived impurity of dancing.

Sometime before 1871, it was purchased by Jacob King. Circa 1871, the house was purchased and used as the residential dwelling of artist, Navy officer, and Union general Joseph Warren Revere and his family. The dwelling was inherited by his son, lawyer and civic activist Paul Revere.
