= Peter Bentley Sr. =

American politician (1805–1875)

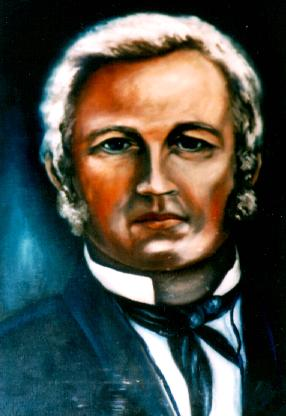

5th Mayor of Jersey City
- In office April 1843 – April 1844
- Preceded by: Thomas A. Alexander
- Succeeded by: Phineas C. Dummer

Personal details
- Born: 1805 Halfmoon, New York
- Died: September 26, 1875 (aged 70) Jersey City, New Jersey
- Spouse: Margaret E. Holmes (m. 1842)
- Children: 2

Peter Bentley Sr. (1805 – September 26, 1875) was the fifth mayor of Jersey City in New Jersey. He succeeded Thomas A. Alexander. He served a single one-year term from April 1843 to April 1844. He was succeeded by Phineas C. Dummer.

== Biography ==
Born on a farm in Halfmoon, New York, Bentley moved to Jersey City, New Jersey, in 1825 and became a lawyer in 1834. He married Margaret E. Holmes on October 13, 1842, and they had two children – Peter and Rosaline.

After his term as mayor, he left politics. He later organized the Mechanics' and Traders' Bank (currently the First National Bank of Jersey City) and became its President. In addition, he was Vice-President of the Savings Bank of Jersey City, Treasurer and later Director of the Gas Company and Treasurer of the Jersey City and Bergen Plank Road Company. He died in Jersey City on September 26, 1875, and was buried in the Old Bergen Church cemetery in Jersey City.
