= Sidney Lawton Smith =

American designer, etcher, engraver, illustrator and bookplate artist

- Sidney Lawton Smith, 1845–1929
- Born: June 15, 1845; Foxborough, Massachusetts
- Died: 1929
- Known for: Designer, engraver, artist
- Spouse: Sarah Jane Groves

Sidney Lawton Smith (1845–1929) was an American designer, etcher, engraver, illustrator, and bookplate artist.

== Early life ==
Smith was born in Foxborough, Massachusetts to Lawton and Lucy Thompson Smith on June 15, 1845. He was the third of three sons. In 1847, his family moved to Canton, Massachusetts, where he was educated in the public school system.

Smith showed an interest and aptitude in artistic efforts from a young age, and in 1863, his parents sent him to apprentice to Reuben Carpenter in Boston to learn steel engraving. Although his mother admonished him to stay in his apprenticeship, in 1864 Smith enlisted with the Union Army and saw active service at the end of the Civil War.

== Designer and Engraver ==
In 1865, Smith returned to Carpenter's engraving shop, but moved on to the shop of Joseph Andrews in 1867. There, he worked on reproductions of the original etchings and woodcuts that had been issued in England with an edition of Dickens's works

Smith began his own engraving establishment in Canton, Massachusetts. He worked on government notes for the American Bank Note Company and on book illustrations for the publisher Riverside Press. In 1877, Smith became an assistant to John LaFarge in the decoration of Trinity Church in Boston. He continued to work with LaFarge on stained glass work and decorative projects that came through LaFarge's studio in New York, until 1887.

In 1893, Smith moved his family and business to Boston. During this period, Smith worked primarily as an etcher and engraver, and a designer of bookplates. Smith's bookplate clients included notable book and engravings collectors, college and public libraries, historical and research societies, publishing houses, bookstores, and collector's clubs.

== Personal life ==
Smith married Sarah Jane Groves on October 13, 1867, and moved with his family to Canton. He and his wife had children, including a daughter, Amy Gertrude Smith, who later wrote a memoir of Sidney Lawton Smith. He and his family moved back to Boston in 1893.

== Death and legacy ==
Smith died in 1929. The American Antiquarian Society holds his papers and other materials, including several bookplate drawings and engravings, copper bookplates, photographs, and his engraving tools.

=== Bookplates ===
Collections of bookplates designed, etched, and engraved by Sidney Lawton Smith are held in the Lewis Stark Bookplate Collection at the University of New Hampshire, and the William Augustus Brewer Bookplate Collection at the University of Delaware.

Bookplates by Sidney Lawton Smith

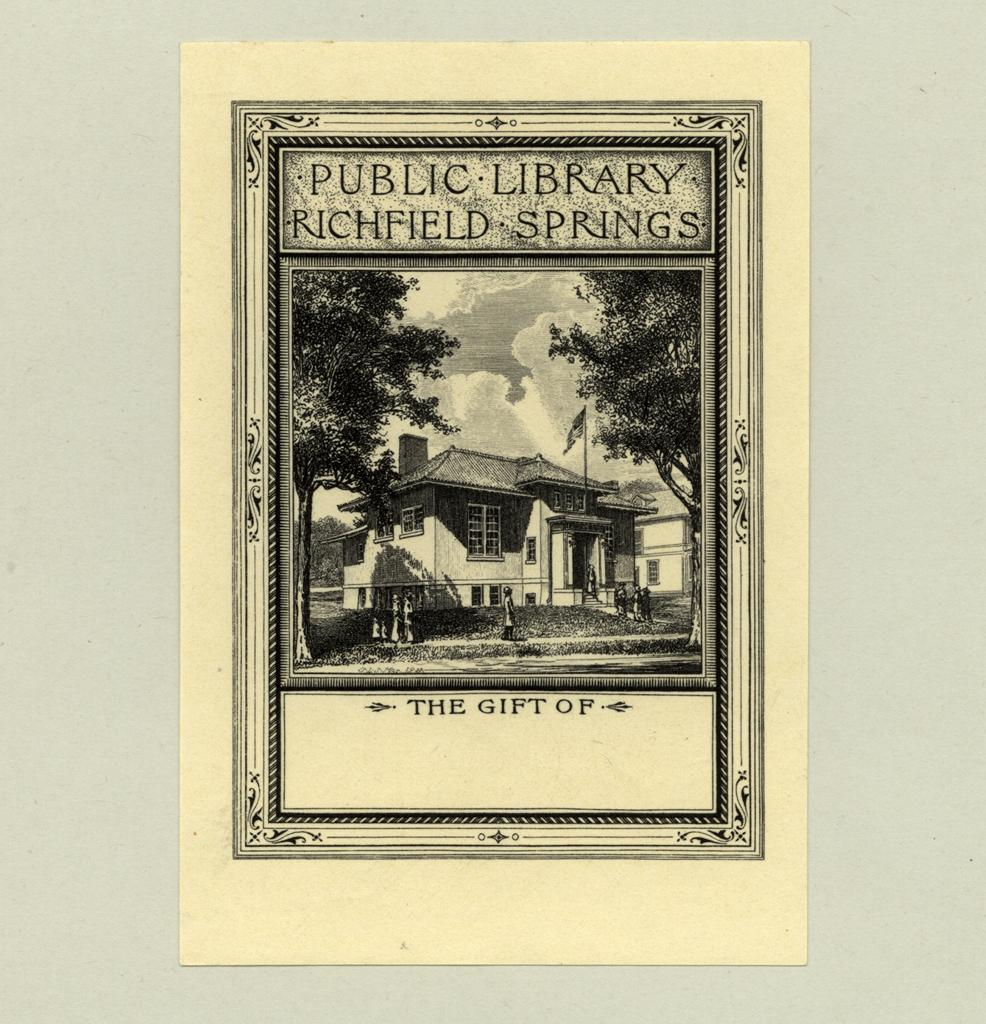
Bookplate for a public library

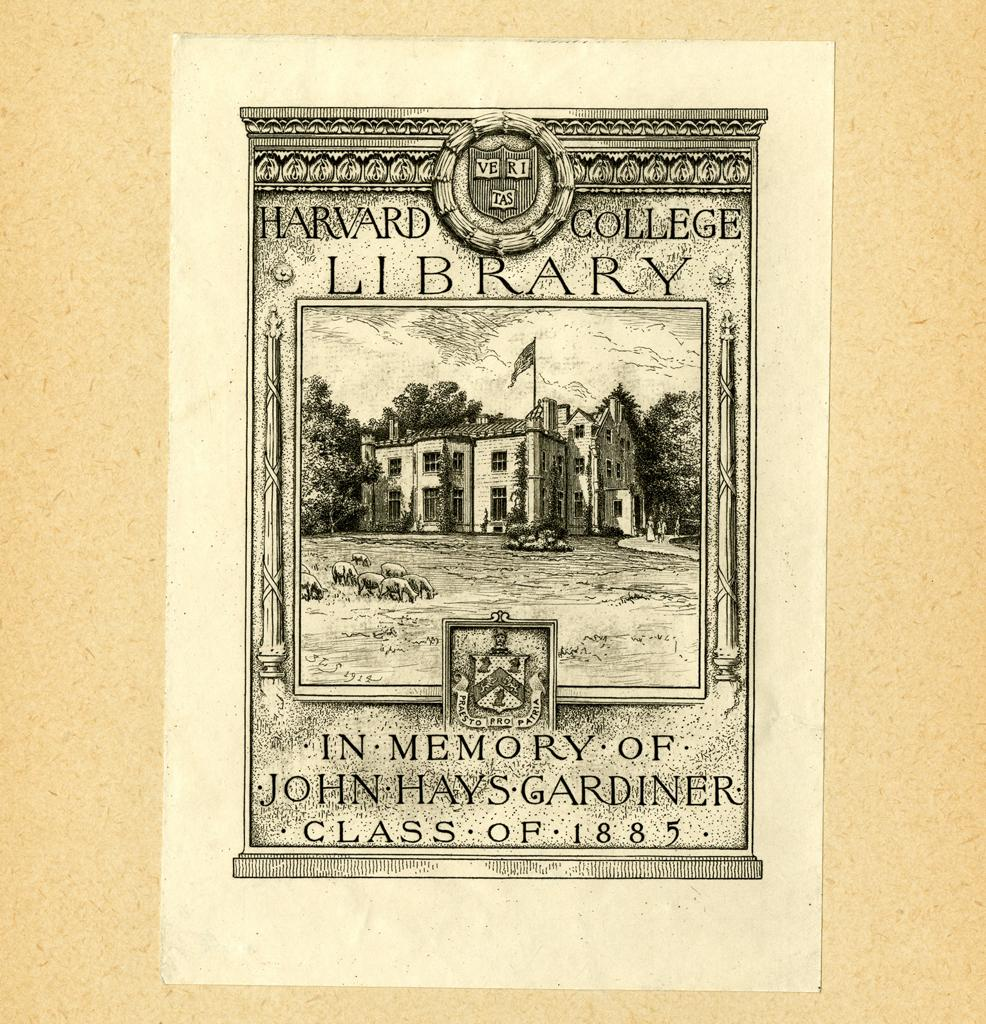
Bookplate for the Harvard College Library

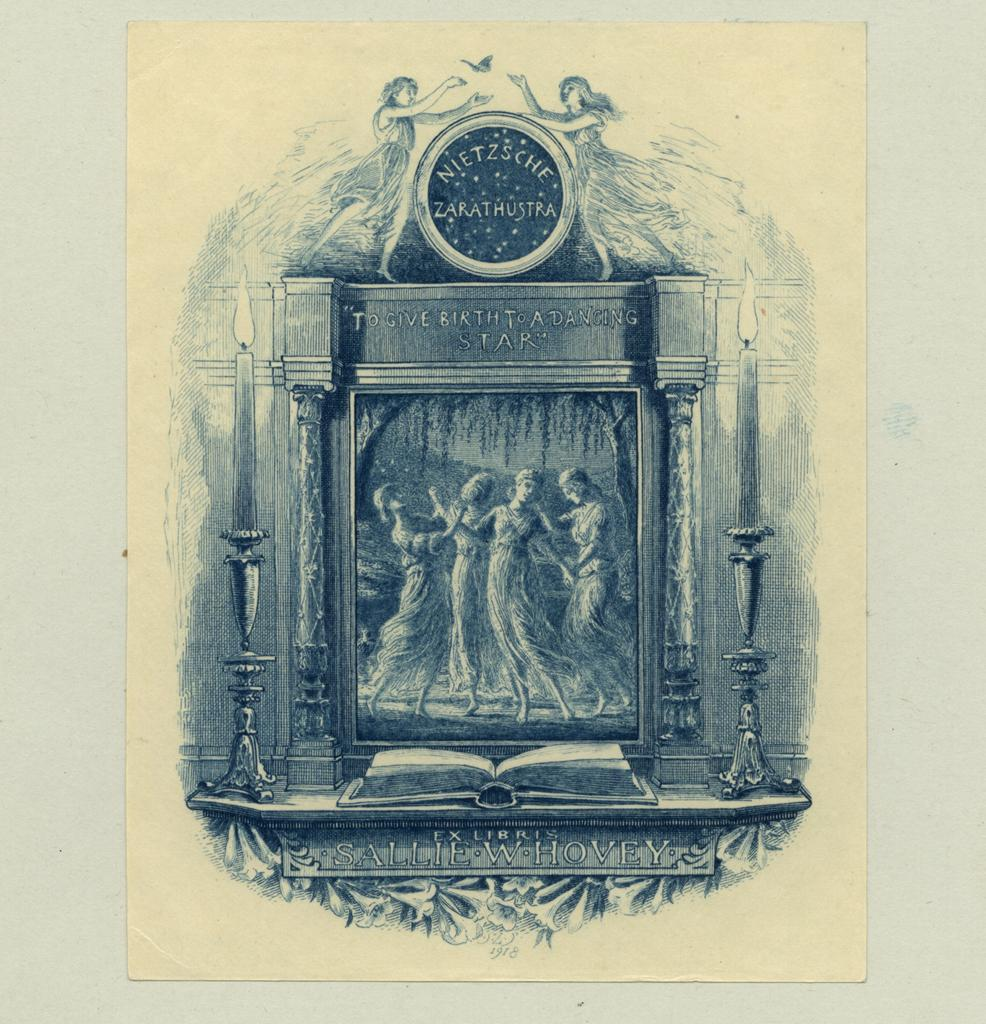
Bookplate for a patron named Sallie W. Hovey

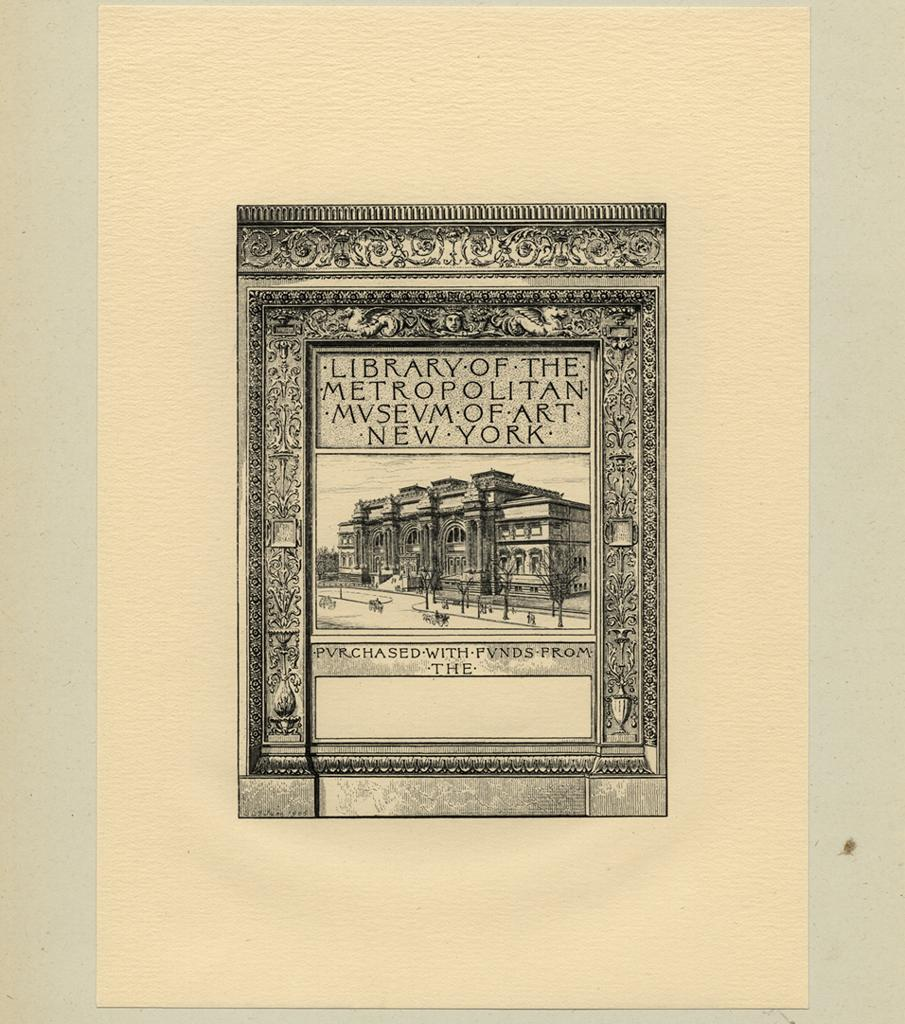
Bookplate for the Library of the Metropolitan Museum of Art

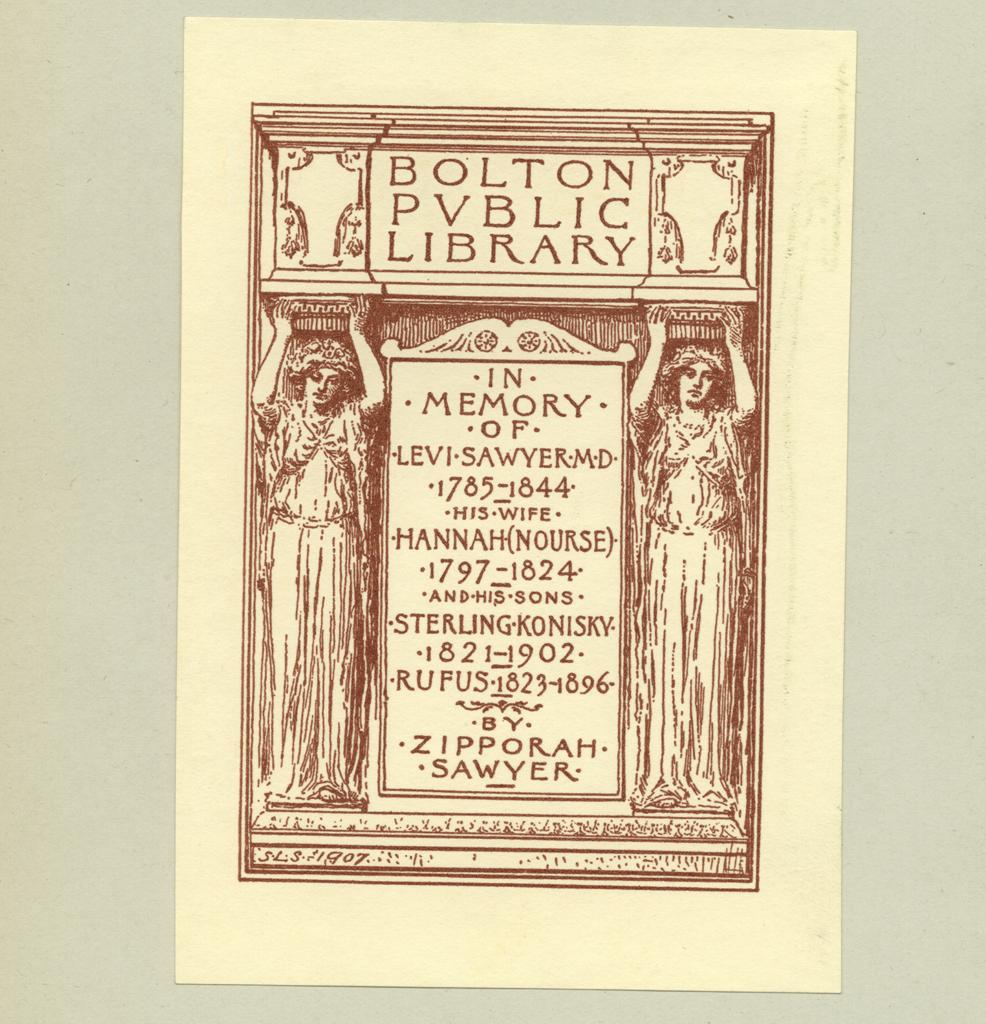
Bookplate for the Boston Public Library

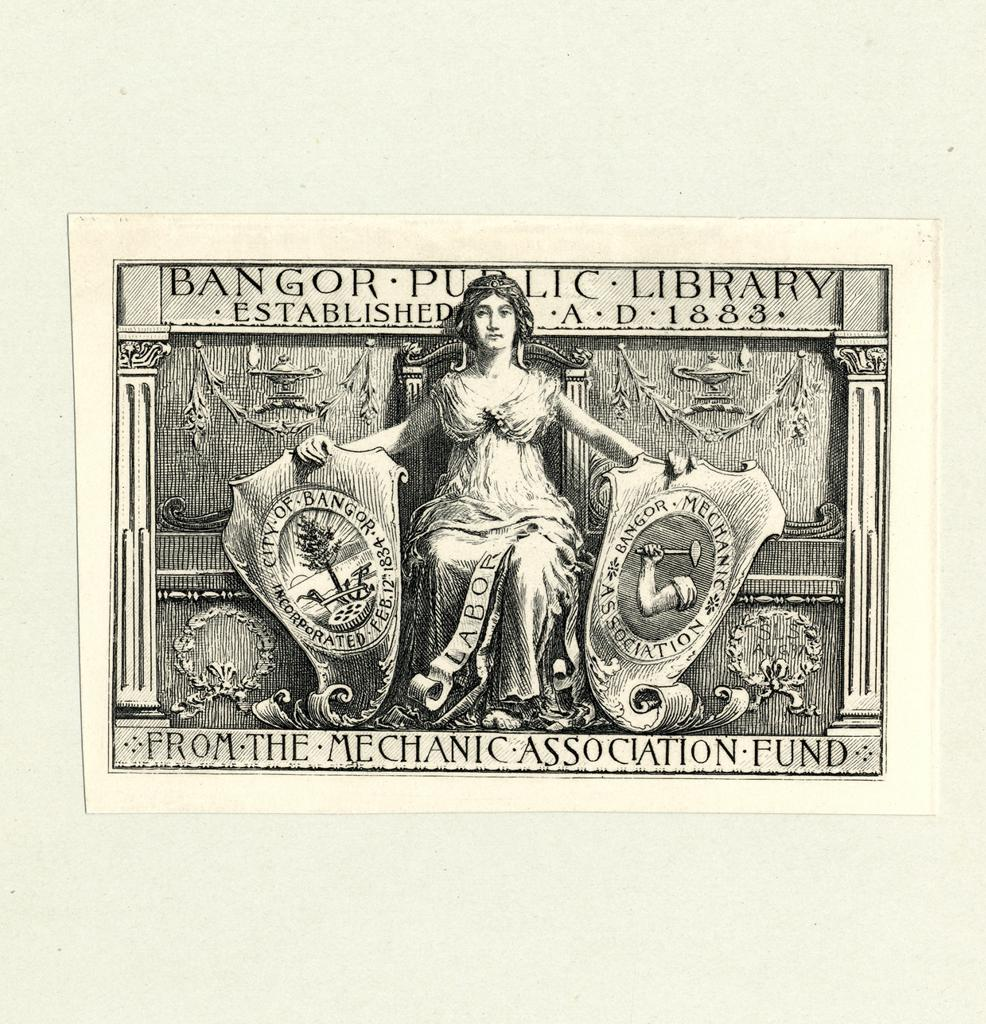
Bookplate for the Bangor Public Library
