= Edwin Davis French =

American bookplate engraver

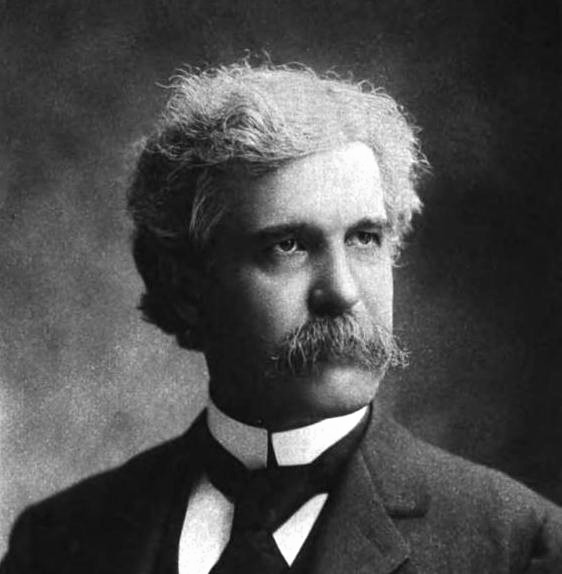
Edwin Davis French

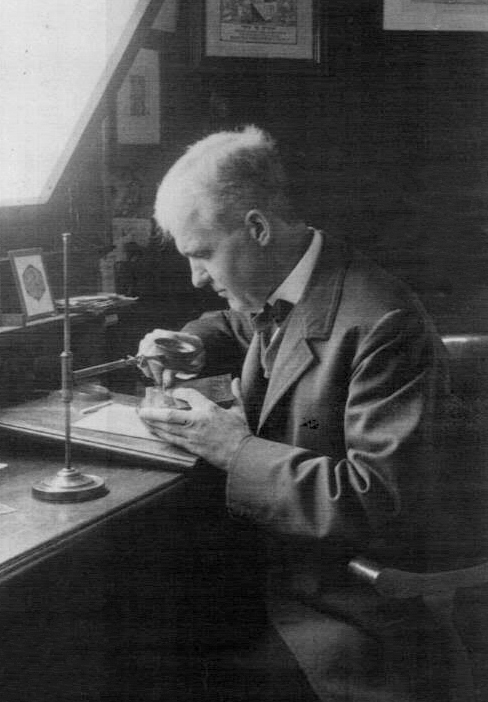
Edwin Davis French later in life

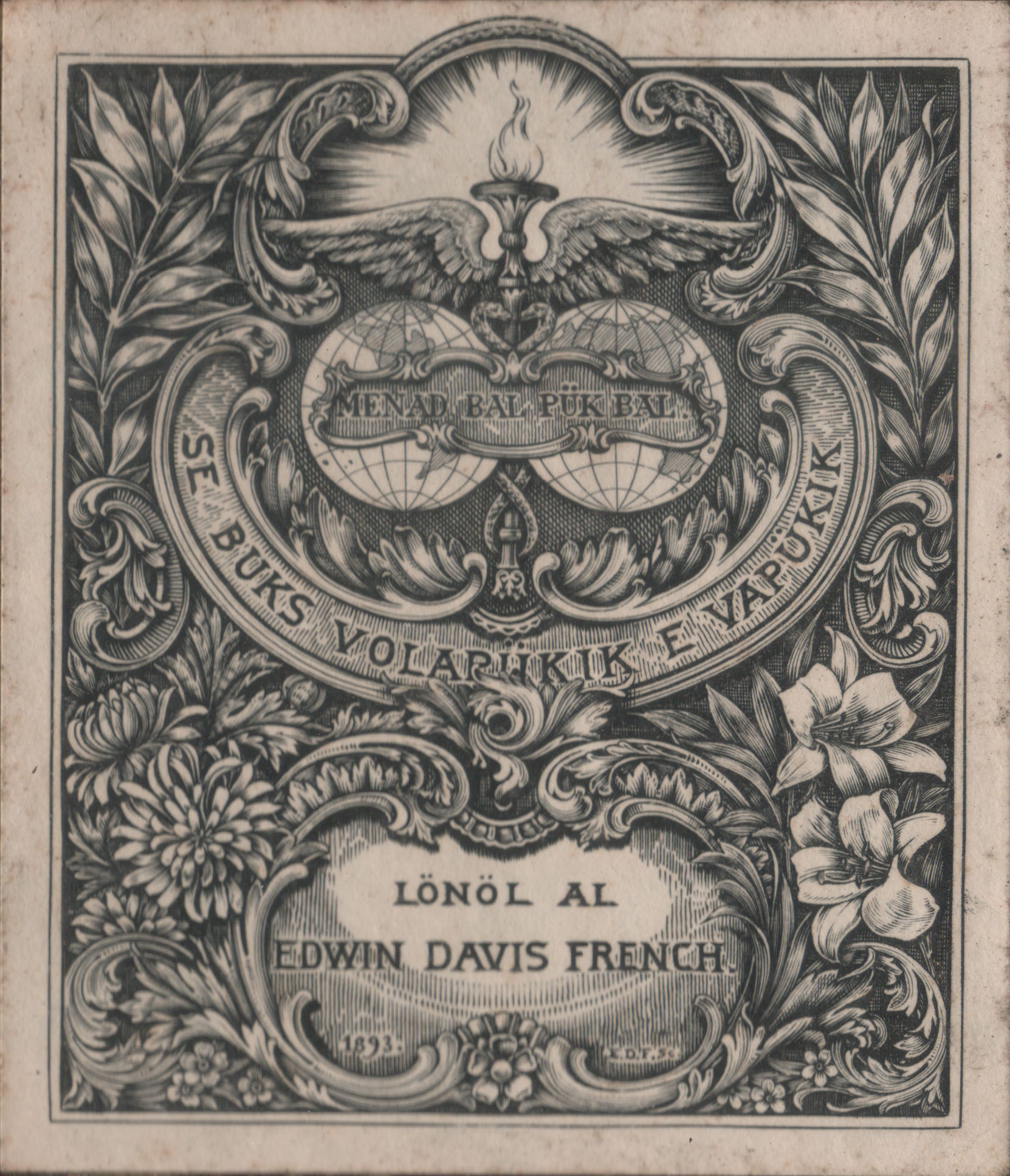
A bookplate designed by French inscribed in Volapük. The inscription translates "One mankind, one language. Out of books on Volapük and international language belonging to Edwin Davis French, 1893"

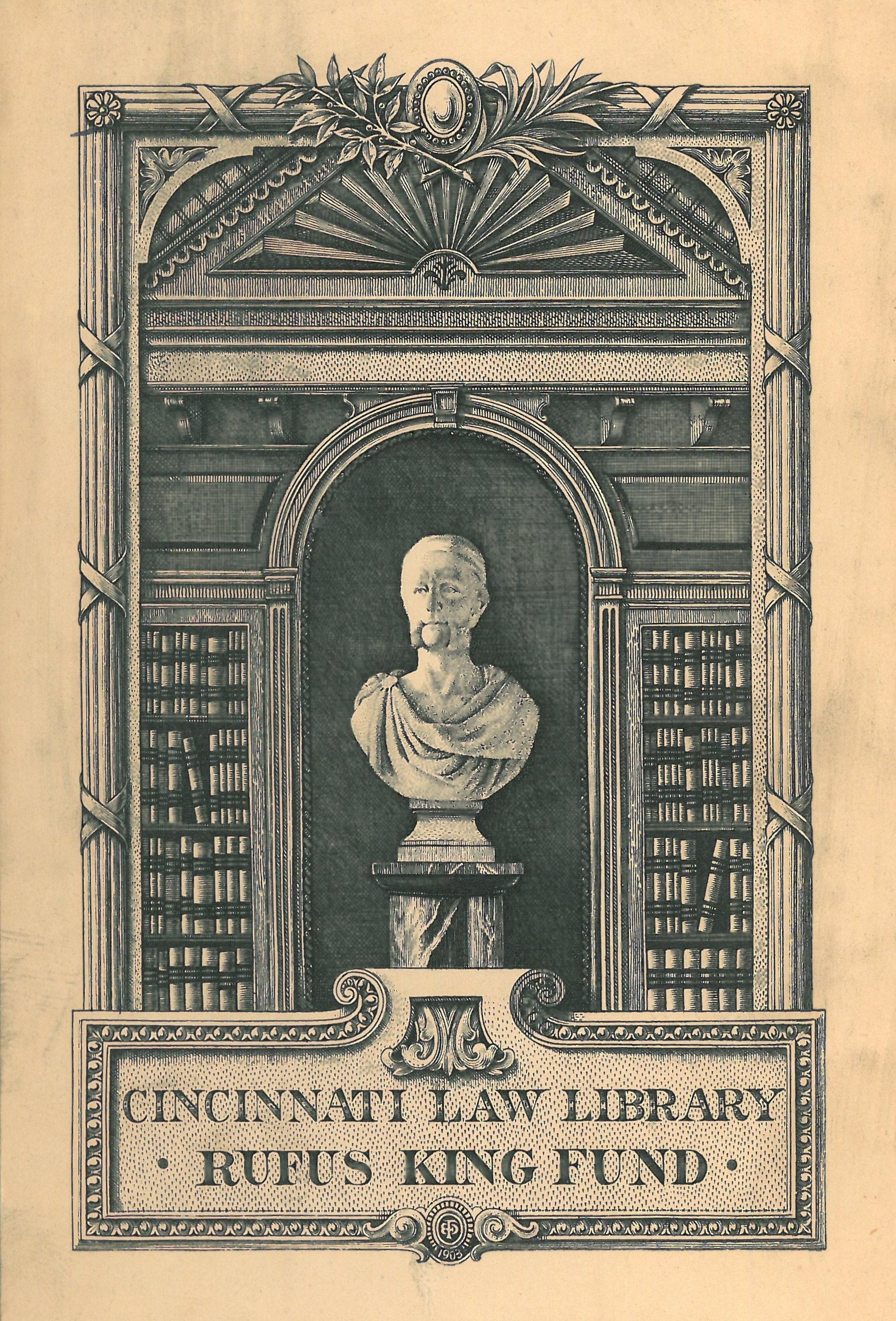
A bookplate designed by French for the Cincinnati Law Library in 1903. It features a bust of Rufus King, who was President of the University of Cincinnati and later Dean of the Cincinnati Law School.

Edwin Davis French (c. 1851–1906) was a bookplate engraver, who produced at least 330 engravings beginning in 1893.

Born in North Attleboro, Massachusetts, his artistic career had begun in 1869 with silver engraving for the Whiting Manufacturing Company. Later, he became a founding member and trustee of the American Fine Arts Society. Two men who influenced French's work were Albrecht Dürer and Charles W. Sherborn. Many of his patrons belonged to the Grolier Club.

He was interested in constructed languages and was active in the Volapük movement, and also learned Esperanto.

His obituary in the New York Times relates:

Mr. French's hobby was universal language, for he was a facile linguist. He was Secretary of the Volapük Society of America, and had a considerable library in that language. Esperante (sic) and Idiom Neutral similarly attracted him. He was a member of the American Fine Arts Society, the International Academy of Volapuk, Ex-Libres Society of London, Ex-Libres Verein of Berlin, the Grolier Club, National Arts Club, Club of Odd Volumes, and Bibliophile Society.

French had suffered from poor health most of his life, having left Brown University in his sophomore year because of it, and eventually succumbed to tuberculosis.
