= Miss Dana's School for Young Ladies =

Coordinates: 40.791970°N 74.476339°W

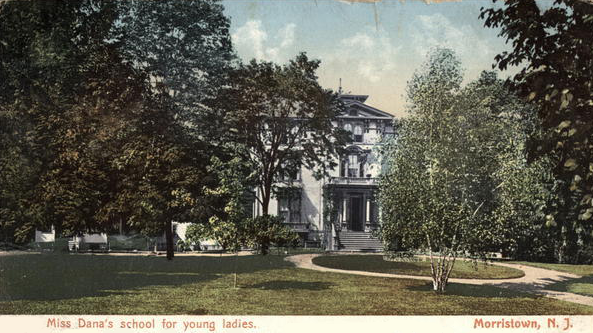
- 1907 postcard illustration

Location
- 163 South Street; Morristown, New Jersey, Morris County; United States of America

Information
- Former name: Morris Female Institute
- Established: 1860
- Closed: 1913

Miss Dana's School for Young Ladies was a private boarding and finishing school active from 1877 to 1912, during the Gilded Age of Morristown. It was founded in 1860 as the Morris Female Institute. Its location was in Morristown, New Jersey at 163 South Street, near Madison Avenue.

In 1877, it was leased and renamed by Miss E. Elizabeth Dana, daughter of famed author, jurist, and progressive politician Robert Henry Dana, Jr., of Cambridge, MA.

Historian John W. Rae described it as "the most progressive school in Morristown at the turn of the century" and claimed it was described as a "school ahead of its time."

== History ==
=== Morris Female Institute ===
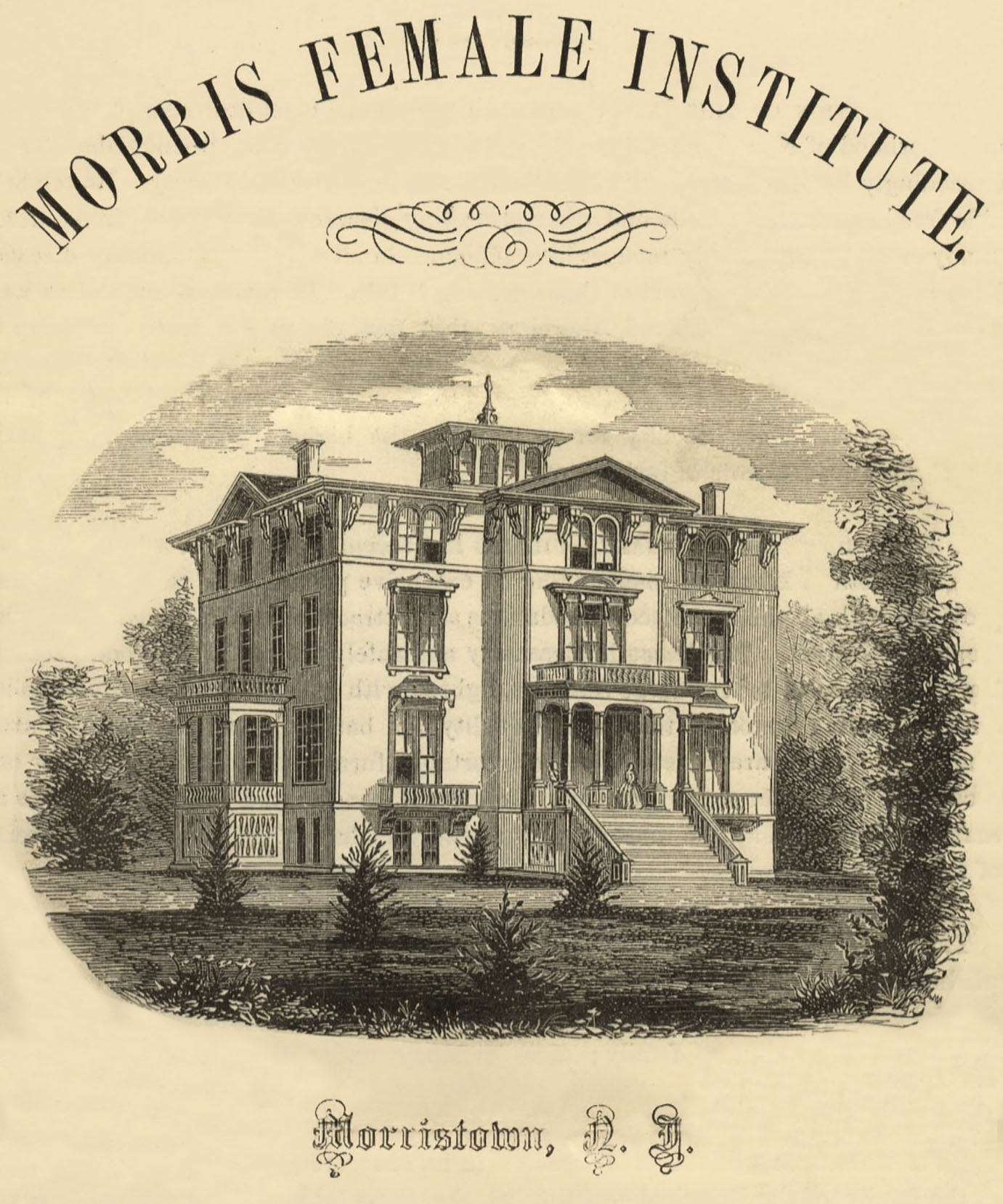
19th century illustration of the Morris Female Institute

In 1860, the school building was incorporated as the Morris Female Institute, and organized in 1861. The school was religiously affiliated with Presbyterianism, and its principal was Professor Charles G. Hazletine. Hazletine, a former schoolteacher, published articles in the New York Tribune circa 1839.

In 1856, the California Department of Public Instruction admonished Professor Charles G. Hazletine for an advertisement of Morris Female Institute, stating his grammar was improper.

In 1873 and 1874, Morris Female Institute had 9 instructors (3 male and 6 female) for a total of 45 female students.

Notable alumni of the Morris Female Institute included sisters Mary Ellen Crane and Julia Crane Corning. Mary Ellen Crane's granddaughter, Broadway actress and antiwar activist Mary Crane Hone, is best known for donating her family's Morristown estate, Acorn Hall.

In 1877, the Morris Female Institute closed.

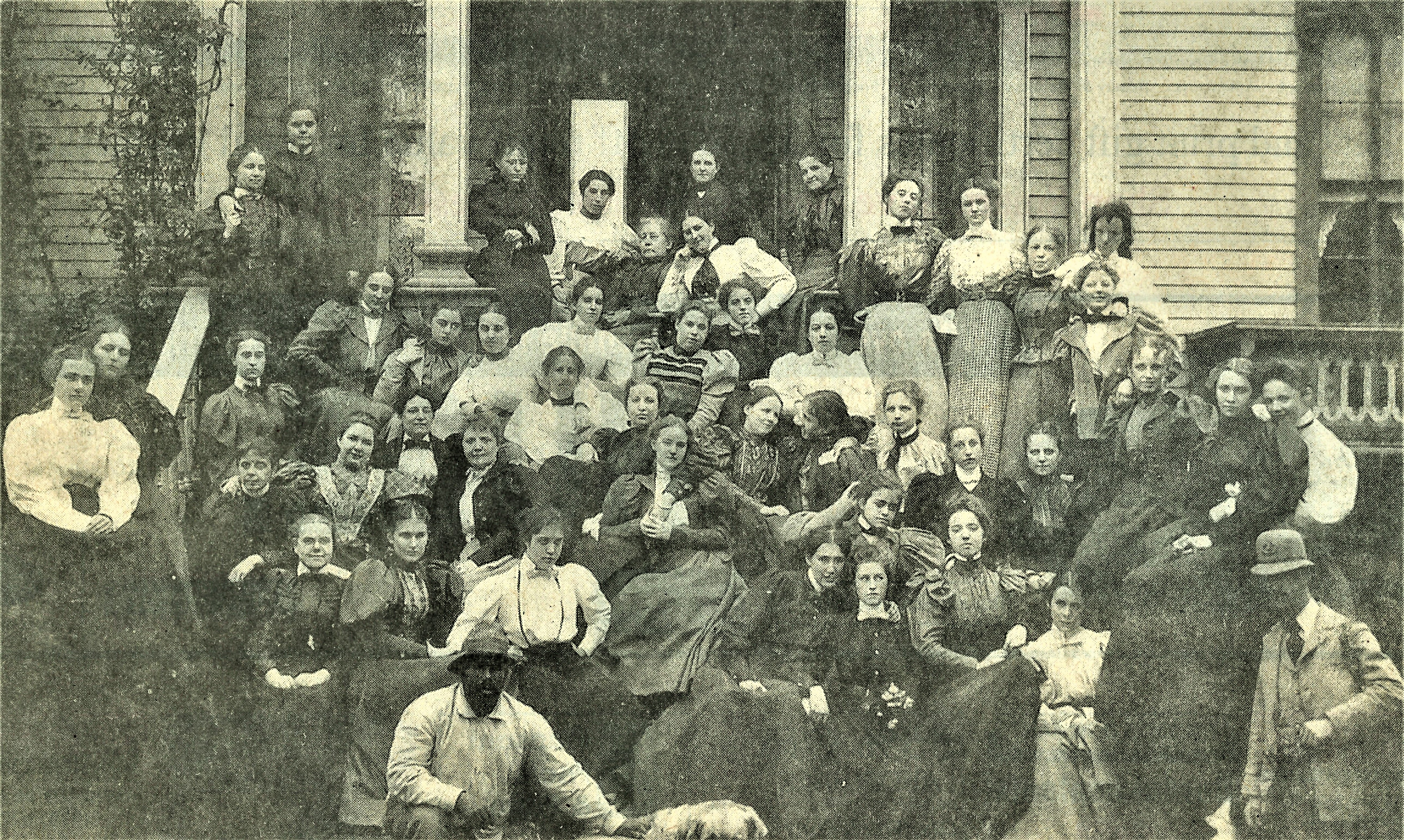
Students and likely faculty of Miss Dana's, pictured in the 1880s

=== Miss Dana's ===
That year, it was leased and renamed by Miss E. Elizabeth Dana, daughter of famed author, jurist, and progressive politician Robert Henry Dana, Jr., of Cambridge, MA.

The first graduating class was in 1891, and the final class graduated in 1912.

The school closed in 1913 following Dana's death.

== Academics ==
Miss Dana's curriculum was classical and collegiate. Subjects included the usual Bible study, reading, writing, history, and math; teachers also taught geometry, chemistry, astronomy, Latin, art, and philosophy. This curriculum was considered very progressive for women's education during the era.

Miss Dana ensured that the "entire school met weekly to discuss current events, and the senior year focused on such themes as exploitation in the slums, reports of muckrakers, and the growth of the Socialist party." She wanted her students to create a forum around contemporary social and political topics. Her philosophy was "intellectual and moral."

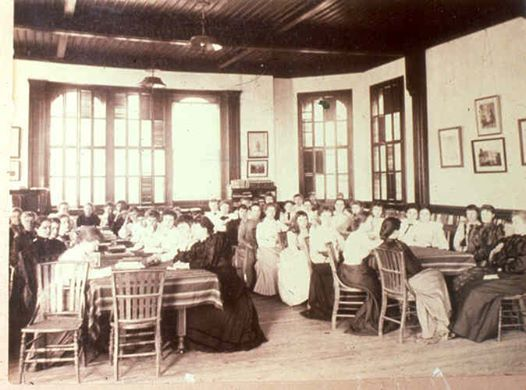
Students seated at Miss Dana's, 1892

According to Arthur F. Kinney's biography of Dorothy Parker, the school was:

in an imposing Victorian house furnished with Oriental rugs, heavy velvet curtains, overstuffed plush sofas, and large chandeliers. [Parker's] fellow students in the small, highly selective classes included wealthy cattle princesses, heiresses, Southern belles and Northern debutantes.

An 1894 advertisement for Miss Dana's in The Century Magazine stated:

Reopens Sept. 19th. Resident, native French and German teachers. Special advantages in Music and Art. Certificate admits to Smith, Wellesley, and the Baltimore College for Women. Terms for boarding pupils, $700.

By 1908, boarding/tuition had increased to $900 per student. By then, the school also included a gymnasium and courses in "Expression" (i.e., public speaking). In 1911, its Century Magazine advertisement read:

A Home and Day School. Established in 1877. Graduate and college preparatory courses. Unusual advantages in Music, Art, Languages, Gymnasium, Out-door sports. Year opens Oct 4, 1911. For circular apply to MISS LOUISE L. NEWELL, Principal.

A school brochure describes their art studio as complete with clay, casts, models, and photographs to use as reference. Art instruction included life drawing and landscape art in crayons, watercolor, and oil paint. Field trips to the Metropolitan and other museums were included in the arts curriculum.

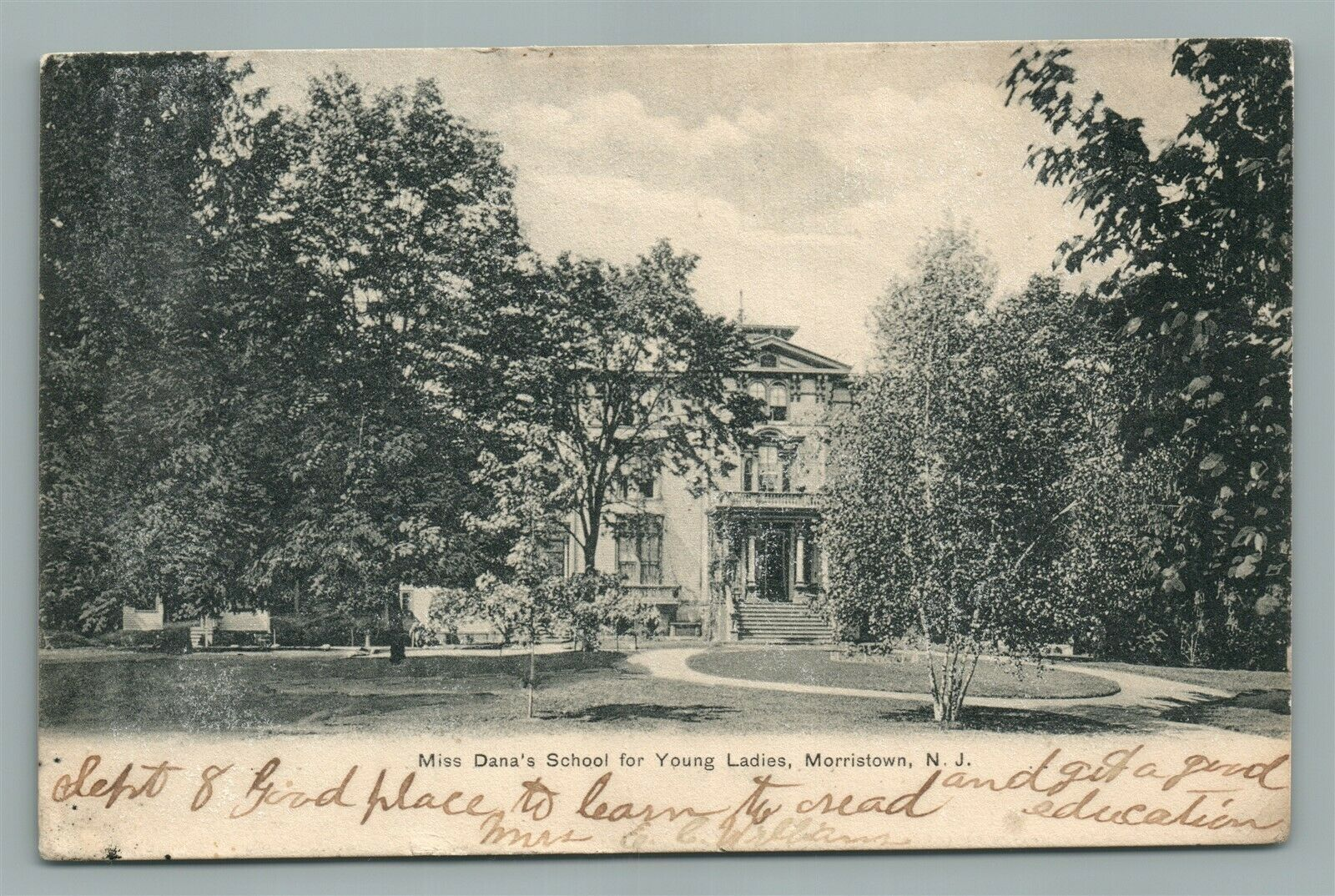
Pre-1907 postcard describing Miss Dana's as a "Good place to learn to read and get a good education"

Because of the well-rounded education Miss Dana provided, her graduating students were automatically accepted to Vassar College, with entrance requirements being waived.

As with most finishing schools, rules were strict. There was no smoking, no going to movie theaters, no eating between meals, no candy, no evening dresses, and no low-neck dresses. Jewelry was to be kept at a minimum. Outings required chaperones and parents had to send monthly allowances by check on time. There were little exceptions to these rules.

Classes were limited to 15 students and taught only by seminar, in hopes of maximizing student potential.

== Legacy ==
On November 18, 1922, about 11 years after the death of Miss Dana and the school's closure, alumnae and students of Miss Dana's School began the Elizabeth Dana Memorial Prize. The Vassar College Bulletin described the stipulations:

The fund is $1375 and is to be invested by Vassar College as a fund, the interest of which shall provide a prize to be awarded by the Faculty of the College to that student in the English Department who has the estimation of the department best fulfilled the requirement of a special reading course, or courses, offered for competition by the department each year. It is understood that no essay shall be required in this competition and no examination beyond such as shall seem necessary to the department to determine among the claimants for the prize.

If the prize is not awarded on a given year, the interest is applied to a purchase of books for the Vassar's English Department, each containing a slip stating its purchase from the "E. Elizabeth Dana Memorial Fund."

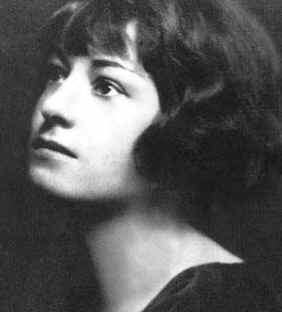
Poet and satirist Dorothy Parker attended Miss Dana's, likely graduating in 1911

== Notable alumni ==
- Dorothy Parker, writer and founding member of the Algonquin Round Table
- Marjorie Hillis, nonfiction novelist and Vogue editor
- Louise Leonard McLaren, social scientist
- Caroline Foster, farmer and philanthropist
- Ethel Cutler Freeman, anthropologist, best known for research on the Floridian Seminole tribe
