= List of The New York Times number-one books of 1937 =

This is a list of books that topped The New York Times best-seller list in 1937. When the list began in 1931 through 1941 it only reflected sales in the New York City area.

== Fiction ==
The following list ranks the number-one best-selling fiction books.

The two most popular books that year were Northwest Passage, by Kenneth Roberts, which held on top of the list for 14 weeks, and The Citadel by A. J. Cronin, which was on top of the list for 9 weeks.

Date	Book	Author
January 4	Gone with the Wind	Margaret Mitchell
January 11	Gone with the Wind	Margaret Mitchell
January 18	Gone with the Wind	Margaret Mitchell
January 25	Gone with the Wind	Margaret Mitchell
February 1	Gone with the Wind	Margaret Mitchell
February 8	Gone with the Wind	Margaret Mitchell
February 15	Gone with the Wind	Margaret Mitchell
February 22	Drums Along the Mohawk	Walter D. Edmonds
March 1	Drums Along the Mohawk	Walter D. Edmonds
March 8	Gone with the Wind	Margaret Mitchell
March 15	Drums Along the Mohawk	Walter D. Edmonds
March 22	Theatre	Somerset Maugham
March 29	Theatre	Somerset Maugham
April 5	Drums Along the Mohawk	Walter D. Edmonds
April 12	Theatre	Somerset Maugham
April 19	Theatre	Somerset Maugham
April 26	Theatre	Somerset Maugham
May 3	The Years	Virginia Woolf
May 10	The Years	Virginia Woolf
May 17	The Outward Room	Millen Brand
May 24	The Outward Room	Millen Brand
May 31	The Years	Virginia Woolf
June 7	The Outward Room	Millen Brand
June 14	The Outward Room	Millen Brand
June 21	The Outward Room	Millen Brand
June 28	The Outward Room	Millen Brand
July 5	The Outward Room	Millen Brand
July 12	The Years	Virginia Woolf
July 19	Northwest Passage	Kenneth Roberts
July 26	Northwest Passage	Kenneth Roberts
August 2	Northwest Passage	Kenneth Roberts
August 9	Northwest Passage	Kenneth Roberts
August 16	Northwest Passage	Kenneth Roberts
August 23	Northwest Passage	Kenneth Roberts
August 30	Northwest Passage	Kenneth Roberts
September 6	Northwest Passage	Kenneth Roberts
September 13	Northwest Passage	Kenneth Roberts
September 20	Northwest Passage	Kenneth Roberts
September 27	Northwest Passage	Kenneth Roberts
October 4	The Citadel	A. J. Cronin
October 11	Northwest Passage	Kenneth Roberts
October 18	Northwest Passage	Kenneth Roberts
October 25	Northwest Passage	Kenneth Roberts
November 1	The Citadel	A. J. Cronin
November 8	The Citadel	A. J. Cronin
November 15	The Citadel	A. J. Cronin
November 22	Northwest Passage	Kenneth Roberts
November 29	The Citadel	A. J. Cronin
December 6	The Citadel	A. J. Cronin
December 13	The Citadel	A. J. Cronin
December 20	The Citadel	A. J. Cronin
December 27	The Citadel	A. J. Cronin

== Nonfiction ==
The following list ranks the number-one best-selling nonfiction books.

Date	Book	Author
January 4	An American Doctor's Odyssey	Victor Heiser
January 11	An American Doctor's Odyssey	Victor Heiser
January 18	An American Doctor's Odyssey	Victor Heiser
January 25	How to Win Friends and Influence People	Dale Carnegie
February 1	How to Win Friends and Influence People	Dale Carnegie
February 8	How to Win Friends and Influence People	Dale Carnegie
February 15	The Hundred Days	Philip Guedalla
February 22	How to Win Friends and Influence People	Dale Carnegie
March 1	How to Win Friends and Influence People	Dale Carnegie
March 8	How to Win Friends and Influence People	Dale Carnegie
March 15	How to Win Friends and Influence People	Dale Carnegie
March 22	How to Win Friends and Influence People	Dale Carnegie
March 29	How to Win Friends and Influence People	Dale Carnegie
April 5	How to Win Friends and Influence People	Dale Carnegie
April 12	How to Win Friends and Influence People	Dale Carnegie
April 19	How to Win Friends and Influence People	Dale Carnegie
April 26	How to Win Friends and Influence People	Dale Carnegie
May 3	Present Indicative	Noël Coward
May 10	Present Indicative	Noël Coward
May 17	Coronation Commentary	Geoffrey Dennis
May 24	How to Win Friends and Influence People	Dale Carnegie
May 31	How to Win Friends and Influence People	Dale Carnegie
June 7	How to Win Friends and Influence People	Dale Carnegie
June 14	How to Win Friends and Influence People	Dale Carnegie
June 21	How to Win Friends and Influence People	Dale Carnegie
June 28	How to Win Friends and Influence People	Dale Carnegie
July 5	Orchids on Your Budget	Marjorie Hillis
July 12	How to Win Friends and Influence People	Dale Carnegie
July 19	Orchids on Your Budget	Marjorie Hillis
July 26	How to Win Friends and Influence People	Dale Carnegie
August 2	Conversation at Midnight	Edna St. Vincent Millay
August 9	How to Win Friends and Influence People	Dale Carnegie
August 16	Conversation at Midnight	Edna St. Vincent Millay
August 23	How to Win Friends and Influence People	Dale Carnegie
August 30	How to Win Friends and Influence People	Dale Carnegie
September 6	Life with Mother	Clarence Day
September 13	How to Win Friends and Influence People	Dale Carnegie
September 20	How to Win Friends and Influence People	Dale Carnegie
September 27	How to Win Friends and Influence People	Dale Carnegie
October 4	How to Win Friends and Influence People	Dale Carnegie
October 11	How to Win Friends and Influence People	Dale Carnegie
October 18	The Arts	Hendrik Willem van Loon
October 25	The Arts	Hendrik Willem van Loon
November 1	How to Win Friends and Influence People	Dale Carnegie
November 8	The Arts	Hendrik Willem van Loon
November 15	How to Win Friends and Influence People	Dale Carnegie
November 22	How to Win Friends and Influence People	Dale Carnegie
November 29	The Arts	Hendrik Willem van Loon
December 6	The Arts	Hendrik Willem van Loon
December 13	The Arts	Hendrik Willem van Loon
December 20	Madame Curie	Ève Curie
December 27	The Importance of Living	Lin Yutang

== See also ==
- Publishers Weekly list of bestselling novels in the United States in the 1930s
