= Caroline Rose Foster =

American farmer (1877–1979)

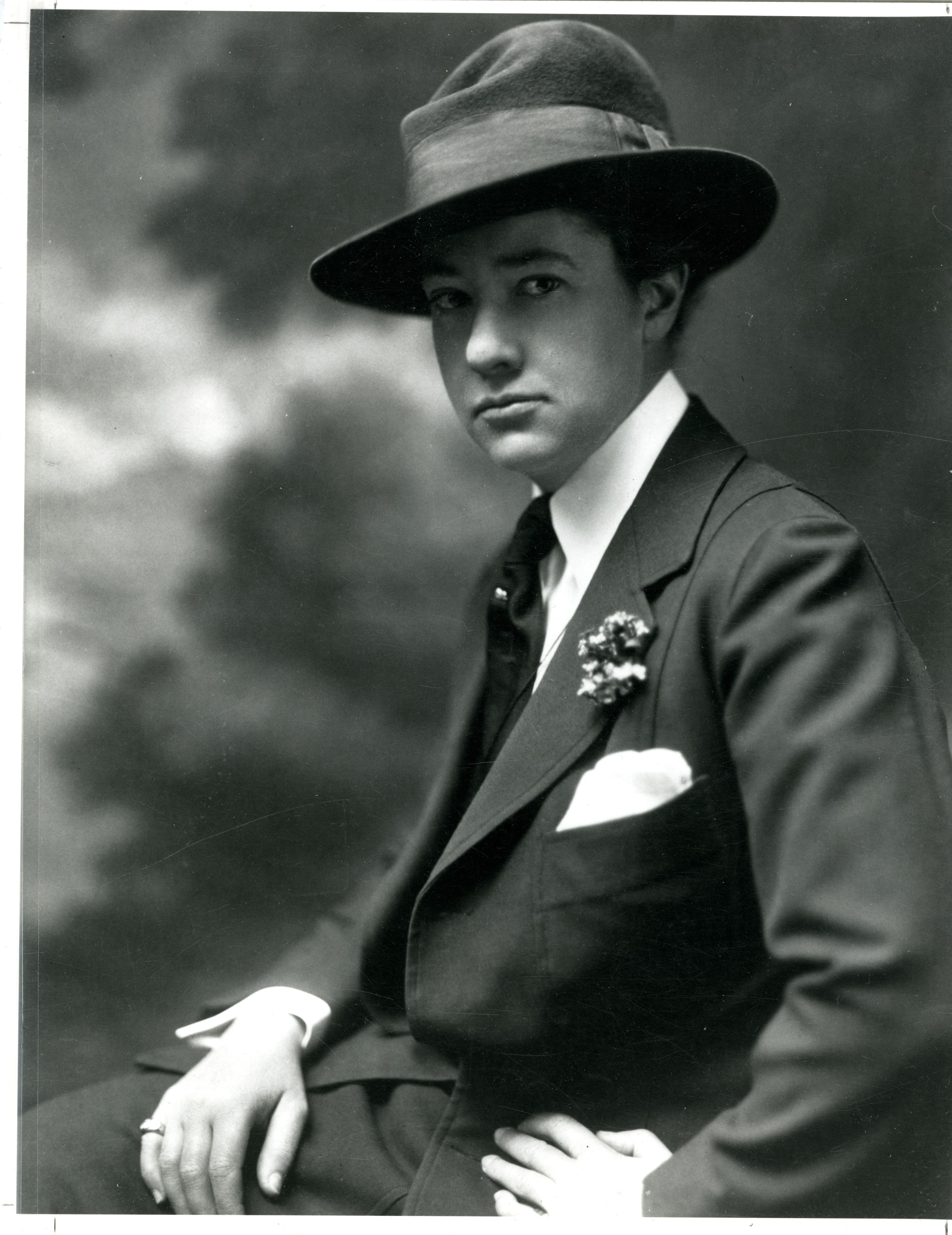
- Foster photographed in 1917
- Born: April 6, 1877; Brooklyn, New York
- Died: July 26, 1979 (aged 102); Morris Township, New Jersey
- Education: Miss Dana's School for Young Ladies
- Occupations: Farmer and philanthropist
- Known for: Contributions to Morris County

Caroline Rose Foster (6 April 1877 – 26 July 1979) was an American farmer and philanthropist who managed Fosterfields, a working farm in Morristown, New Jersey, United States. Beginning in 1910 and throughout her life, Foster challenged gender roles of the Progressive Era by wearing men's clothing including men's hats, pants, shoes, and tuxedos.

Foster was a member of over 30 civic and historical organizations including the Washington Association, Washington Valley Community, Madison Historical Society, Canal Society of N.J., Morris County Golf Club, Morristown Lawn Tennis Club, the Woman's Club of Morristown, and the Morris County Historical Society. She was skilled in fishing, writing, local politics, and carpentry.

Upon her death in 1979, she donated much of her estate (historic objects, Revere home, and farm) to the Morris County Park Commission to "preserve her beloved home and open it to visitors." She lived 99 of her 102 years on the Fosterfields property. In 2009, Foster was among 100 women honored by the National Women's History Project as "women taking the lead to save our planet".

== Early life ==
Caroline "Cara" Rose Foster was born on April 6, 1877, in New York City to Emma Louise Thompson and Charles Grant Foster.

Her mother, Emma Louise Thompson (1842–1880), was born in New York City in 1842. Thompson's father was James Burnet Thompson of Mendham.

Her father, Charles Grant Foster (1842–1927), was born in Manchester, Connecticut (near Hartford, Connecticut), in 1842.

In 1862, during the Civil War, he voluntarily enlisted in the 22nd Connecticut Infantry Regiment (organized in Hartford) as a private. By 1863, he had been promoted to a sergeant major and then first lieutenant.

In 1863, Foster's father became a member of the New York Product Exchange. The same year, he began as a clerk at Ward & Co., a warehouse, grain, and commodities exchange business in Brooklyn, New York. This would later become Ward & Foster; he worked there as a commodity broker.

Emma Louise Thompson and Charles Grant Foster were wed on November 12, 1869. After they married, they lived with Charles's sister Harriet Foster and her husband John Seely Ward on Pierrepont Street in the Brooklyn Heights. Charles and Emma had two sons before Caroline: Ward (1870–1873) and Charles Jr. (1874–1877). They both died in childhood, before Foster was born.

By 1878, her mother had developed tuberculosis. With her infant daughter, Emma Foster travelled to Tennessee and other Southern states with a nurse to receive medical care. However, Emma Foster died of tuberculosis in February 1880. She was buried in the family plot in Brooklyn's Green-Wood Cemetery.

=== Move to Fosterfields ===
From 1878 until 1880, the Fosters rented a mansion and farm estate from General Joseph Warren Revere, a Union general of the Civil War and grandson of Paul Revere. This was possibly to stay near Morristown to provide Emma Foster with TB treatment prior to her death in 1880.

In 1881, a year after Emma Foster's death, Charles G. Foster bought the Morris County farm from the family of Joseph Warren Revere. Revere had died the previous year of a heart attack. Included in the purchase was The Willows, the Gothic Revival mansion partially designed by Revere, and all of the art and furniture within. Foster renamed it Fosterfields, and from 1881 to 1915 developed it as a farm breeding Jersey cattle.

In 1882, Charles Foster travelled to the island of Jersey to buy Jersey cattle for the farm, and continued to do so with his brother in 1883. In 1884, Charles Foster travelled again to Jersey, this time bringing Caroline Foster and her aunt Carrie Thompson along.

Referring to a memory from 1883, Foster has stated:

At the mature age of six, my greatest joy was to sit by the side of [Jacob Arnold's road] and watch the world go by in buggies, farm wagons, ahorse and afoot.

After the move, Foster's aunt, Caroline "Carrie" Thompson, joined the household to care for Foster in her youth.

From about 1880 to 1890, Foster recalled traveling to Castle Garden (New York's immigration center before Ellis Island) to hire young women as soon as they arrived from Ireland. The Fosters had as many as 3 Irish maids work and sleep in an upstairs room of The Willows.

=== Education ===
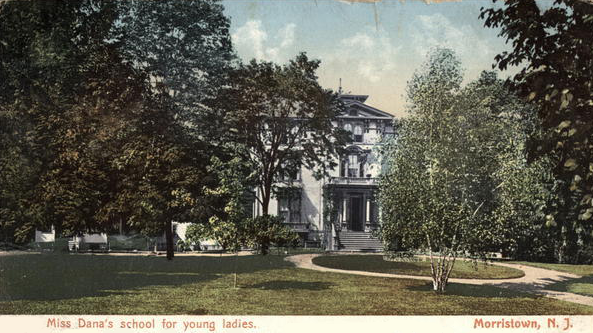
Miss Dana's School for Young Ladies, which Foster attended from 1886 to 1896.

Beginning in 1886, Foster attended Miss Dana's School for Young Ladies in Morristown. According to historian Becky Hoskins, this was the best education available in Morristown. At Miss Dana's, she studied a classical curriculum, including Shakespeare, art skills, and astronomy. She engaged in school plays.

In 1896, Foster graduated from Miss Dana's. Her social debut was held on April 7, 1896, at 11 pm in McAlpin Hall in Morristown, a venue that often hosted dances and entertainments at the time. 125 to 150 guests were invited.

Its refreshments were catered by the upscale Wilbur F. Day's Restaurant, Confectioner and Caterers at 40 Park Place in Morristown. Day's Restaurant was best known for its ice cream, of which Foster was a lifelong fan, as well as elaborate wedding cakes. The debut's catered menu included chicken and lobster croquettes, chicken salad, "boned turkey," Neapolitan ice cream, "ice cream fruits," Tortoni cake, Afghan biscuits, bon-bons, frappés, lemonade, and a punch bowl. Henry Giesmann's Orchestra performed at the event. In 1979, at age 101, Foster recalled that all her friends from Miss Dana's were there, and the boys were home from college for spring break; she stated, "Everyone danced with me – they had to, it was my party." She also stated that the punch was "weak." The local Morristown paper reported that dining and dancing went on until early in the morning.

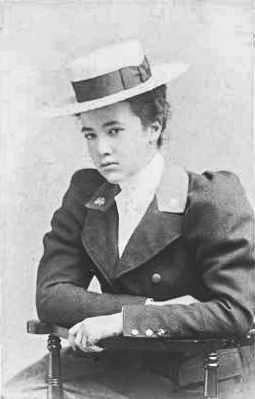
Foster circa 1894, aged 17

The following day, her friends all signed and gifted her a "coming out fan," a decorative bamboo and paper hand fan with a golden Japanese-inspired floral pattern. Her friends wrote their signatures on the fan, congratulating Foster on her official entry into adult society. The fan is currently owned by the Morris County Park Commission and it can be viewed online.

Foster's father did not allow her to attend college. In 1975, regarding how her gender affected her opportunities, Foster has stated,

I could have been a lawyer, but back in my day, women had nothing. All they could do was sit on the piano bench and sew or crochet.

Also in 1896, at the age of 19, Foster attended William McKinley's presidential inauguration in Washington D.C. and met him in a receiving line. She later recounted this experience to Pat Nixon at the Seeing Eye.

== Life at Fosterfields ==
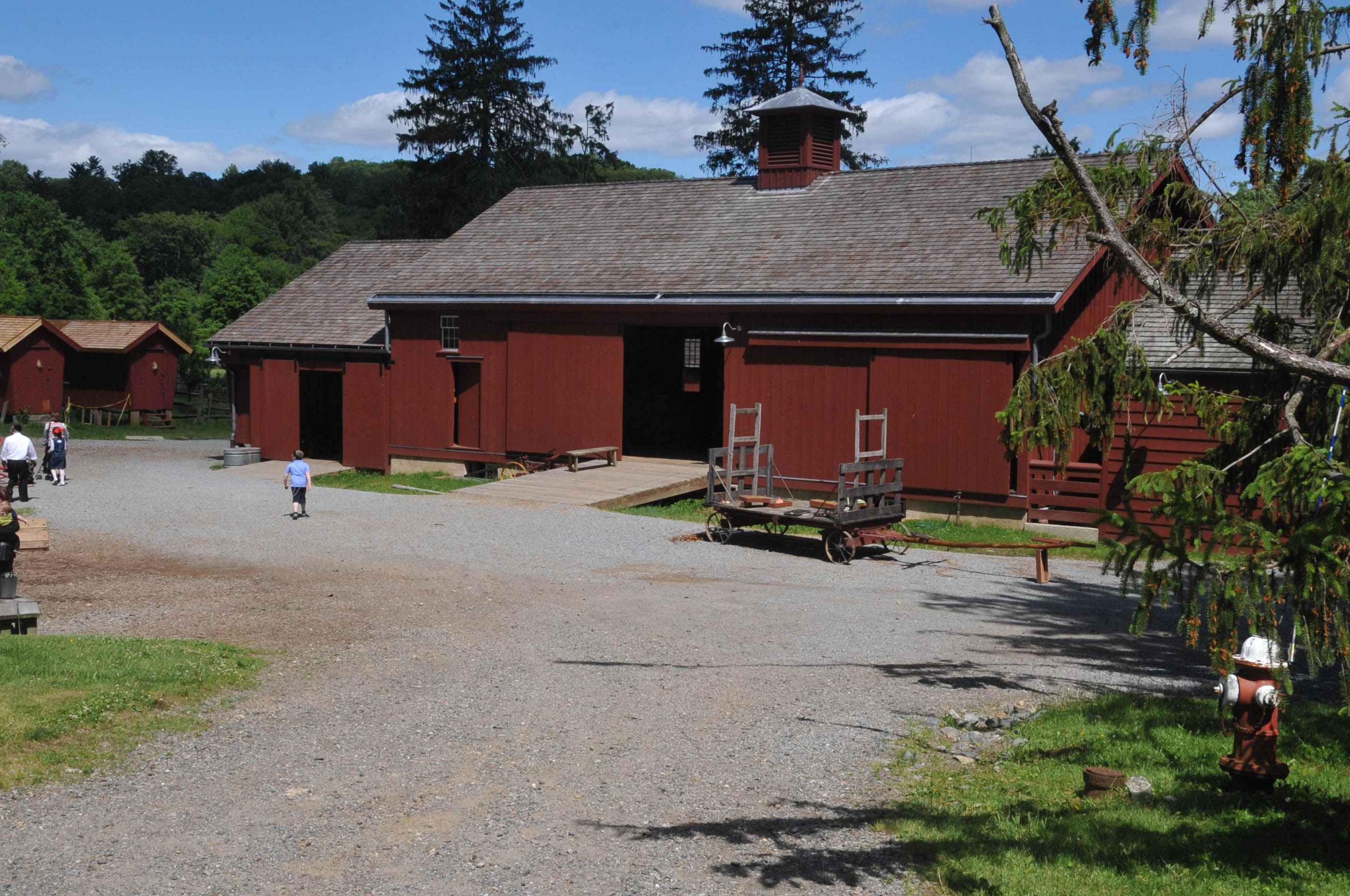
View of the main barn at Fosterfields

By the year 1900, Caroline Foster had lived on Fosterfields for 19 of her 23 years. That year, Foster joined the Morristown Lawn Tennis Club. In 1903, Foster joined the Morris County Golf Club. She was also involved in the Morristown Library's Modern Mondays, a monthly reading club that included anthropologist Ethel Cutler Freeman, author Dorothy Kunhardt, and Elinor Parker, manager of Scribner's Book Store.

By 1901, Charles Foster had repeatedly referred to "Cara's garden" in his weather journal, suggesting that she had begun skilled gardening by the age of 24 years old. This may have been the same garden beside which Foster later built her Temple of Abiding Peace from 1916 to 1919.

In 1907, Foster and her father were included in a directory of prominent New York families' homes (referred to as "fashionable addresses") in Dau's New York Blue Book. From the 1880s to the 1920s (i.e., the Gilded Age of Morristown), Morristown was a hub for millionaires to erect mansions and socialize, comparable to Rhode Island's Newport or Long Island's North Shore. She socialized with wealthy local families including the Twombleys, the Frelinghuysens, and the Moores, despite the fact that her family was not as wealthy and socially elite; they enjoyed tea parties, dog shows, dinners, and sporting events.

Around 1910, Foster first adopted masculine clothing in her daily life. In place of women's dresses customary to the era, photographs display Foster in masculine clothing including men's hats, ties, shirt, jacket, and shoes paired with a skirt. Although it was unusual for the time, her radical clothing furthered her popularity. In the 1977 Morristown Daily Record, Foster explained,

I was never a slave to fashion and always found this most comfortable for all occasions.

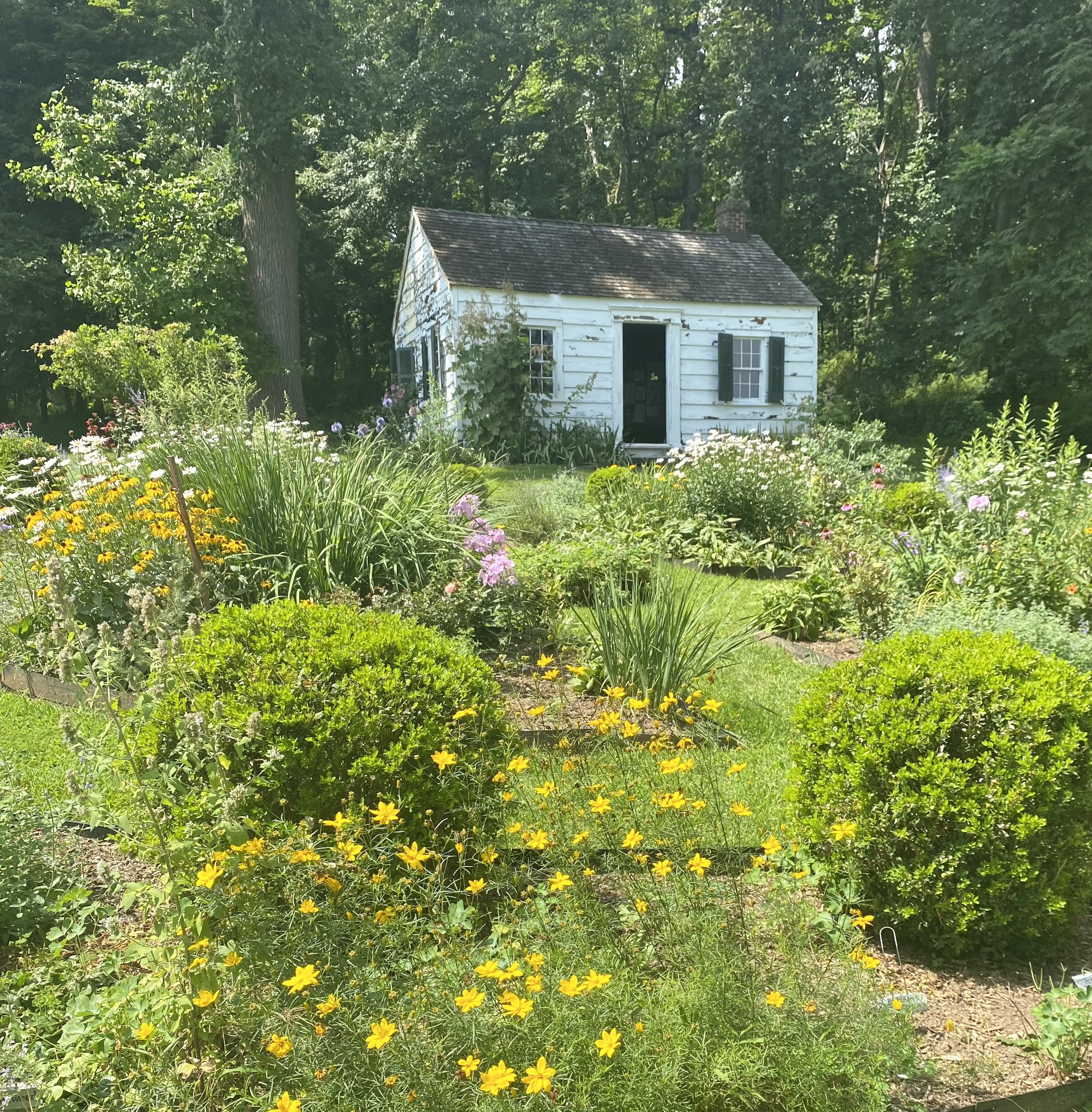
Foster constructed The Temple of Abiding Peace and its adjoining garden from 1916 to 1919.

=== Construction of cottage ===
Foster was skilled in carpentry and woodworking. In 1911, she constructed chicken coops for the farm.

In 1915, after the 1774 Ogden farmhouse burned down at Fosterfields, she assisted Morristown contractor George Mills in rebuilding the farmhouse based on her memories of its layout and interior.

The Temple of Abiding Peace is a cottage and garden in Fosterfields. Both of these were designed, constructed, and established by Caroline Foster.

In 1915, Foster became a member of the Garden club in Morristown.

In 1916, at the age of 39, she began to construct a one-room Cape Cod-style cottage outside of the mansion, to have a respite from the main house. Around this time, she had daily supervision of the farm employees, and her father was also losing his hearing, which biographer Becky Hoskins claims "must have been frustrating" for Foster. Foster determined to complete construction on her own. She dug the foundation by hand and built the framework herself. She gathered stones from the woods for the fireplace; sand from the nearby brook (for the foundation; a proportion of 2 cement to 6 sand & gravel); barn boards from lumber store C. W. Ennis; and flooring from the Thebaud house. Tools used included a hammer, a ripsaw, a crosscut saw, a ruler, a shovel, and a trowel. The cost of building was $200. Foster included the door knocker which was found in the ashes of the original 1774 Ogden house. In journals and blueprints, she referred to the cottage as "The Temple of Abiding Peace," likely as a response to the conflict of the Great War.

Of the cottage's construction, Foster recalled:

Pa said I couldn't do it, but at night he would sneak out and see what I'd done, then boast to his friends about it.

Foster completed construction in 1919. Sources do not indicate whether she hired carpenters for the effort. The Temple of Abiding Peace was used as her workshop, to entertain guests, and to craft birdhouses with friends.

Historic landscape consultant Marta McDowell considers the cottage's flower garden historically significant because it "displays features that span the history of the 19th- and 20th-century American gardening: the Romantic era of the early 1800s, the Colonial Revival of 1876 onwards, and the imported English perennial borders of the early 20th century." The garden historically included lilacs, peonies, irises, phlox, and daisies, as described in Foster's diary entries and illustrated in her close friend Hattie Evans's 1920 watercolor landscape of the cottage. About a decade later, Evans created a second watercolor painting of Foster working in the garden.

=== World War I ===
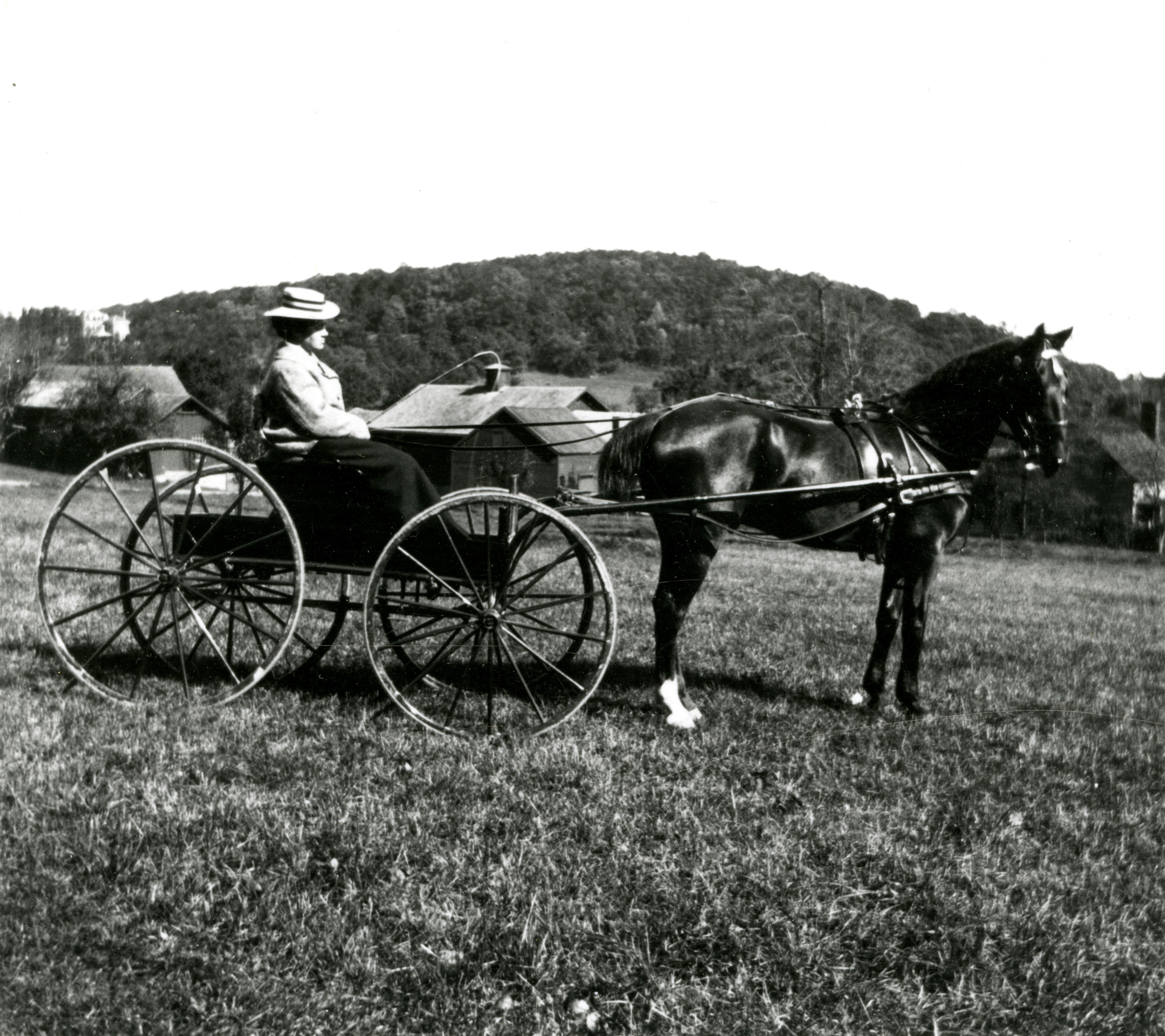
Foster driving a runabout carriage, circa 1915, at Fosterfields

On Caroline Foster's 40th birthday (April 6, 1917), the United States entered the Great War. Foster's 1918 Wanamaker diary indicates her involvement in the Red Cross, the canning committee, and WWI liberty bonds. Circa 1918, Foster details a WWI-related event on April 4:

Spoke at the Palace and Park theatres on behalf of the Red Cross. Some ordeal but it can be done & why should I refuse to do my part more than another?

Circa 1918, from March to October, Foster canvassed the Morristown community to fundraise for Liberty bonds to expend the Allies in the Great War. In one entry, Foster says she "paid call upon Mrs. Kountze. Poor pathetic lady, old & alone. Procured $10,000 for Liberty Loan." Mrs. Kountze was the widow of American banker Luther Kountze of the Kountze Brothers in New York City. She lived on their farm estate, "Delbarton," which later became the Delbarton School. On October 8, 1918, regarding her feelings during the war, she wrote:

If this war were only over that one might enjoy the beauty of the countryside – The corn like tents of an army camped and beyond, the green of the wheat, a promise of a greener spring. Through the trees sun setting in a glory of gold. What more could the heart desire. [sic]

When armistice was announced on November 11, 1918, Foster wrote,

Peace officially confirmed everyone has gone mad..great news Dinner HBE [Hattie Evans] [sic]

Around this time, while Foster was in her 40s, her eyesight began to deteriorate. This would lead to almost total blindness later in her life.

In April 1917, Foster's uncle, Sheriff William H. Thompson (1914–16), appointed Foster as the first female deputy sheriff in Morris County.

By 1918, her and close friend Hattie Evans drove Evans's Hupmobile to patriotic World War I rallies, Red Cross meetings, and fishing expeditions.

In 1921, Foster was elected to the Morris County Republican Committee and held the position until 1961. She also served as a challenger at polling booths.

=== Automobile ownership ===
By 1920, most of Foster's friends had automobiles while she did not. Foster wanted to own an automobile, and it can be assumed her family had the wealth to afford it, but her father's opposition to vehicles prevented her from doing so. Instead, Foster travelled to social events, civic events, and fishing-holes by horse and carriage or hitching a ride on a friend's automobile, such as her friend Hattie Evans who owned a Hupmobile circa 1918.

For Christmas Day, 1922, when Foster was 45 years old, Foster's friends had pooled their money and bought her a Model T Ford coupe for $450–$500. One of the friends behind the gift claimed it was "the best and greatest surprise I think Cara ever got in her life. First time anybody had ever put their minds on what she needed." The chauffeur of Henry Rawle's family at Knox Hill Road drove the car to Fosterfields to deliver it on Christmas Day. The car was adorned with a red ribbon, red bows, and two white decorative doves. When Charles Foster saw the vehicle driven onto the property, the following exchange occurred:

Charles Foster: "What is this thing out here?"
Caroline Foster: "Automobile."
Charles Foster: "Tell that fellow to take his damned contraption back! Get it off the place!"

The following day, Foster left at 8 am to drive to Hartford, Connecticut, to visit her aunts Alice and Emma Phelps Foster. She took her lunch and 5 gallons of gas for her Model T town car. Its electric starter and crank method were dangerous to maneuver; its crank drew gasoline into the engine cylinders to ignite it, and if improperly handled, the crank could knock back and break bones. Because she immediately was able to drive, it can be assumed that her friends Hattie Evans and Mildred Eddy allowed Foster to drive their automobiles. In 1968, Foster recalled;

As I drove along those 150 miles of deep rutted dirt roads at 20 miles per hour, I scarcely passed another car. Traveling then was much easier than today. You could enjoy the ride and watch the scenery and stop at the side of the road for lunch.

At 8 pm, she arrived at her aunts' house in Hartford and went right to bed, presumably from exhaustion. Once she returned to New Jersey, her father refused to allow Caroline Foster to park it on the property; Foster had to use her neighbors' garage. Charles Foster later relented and built a one-bay garage for the Model T.

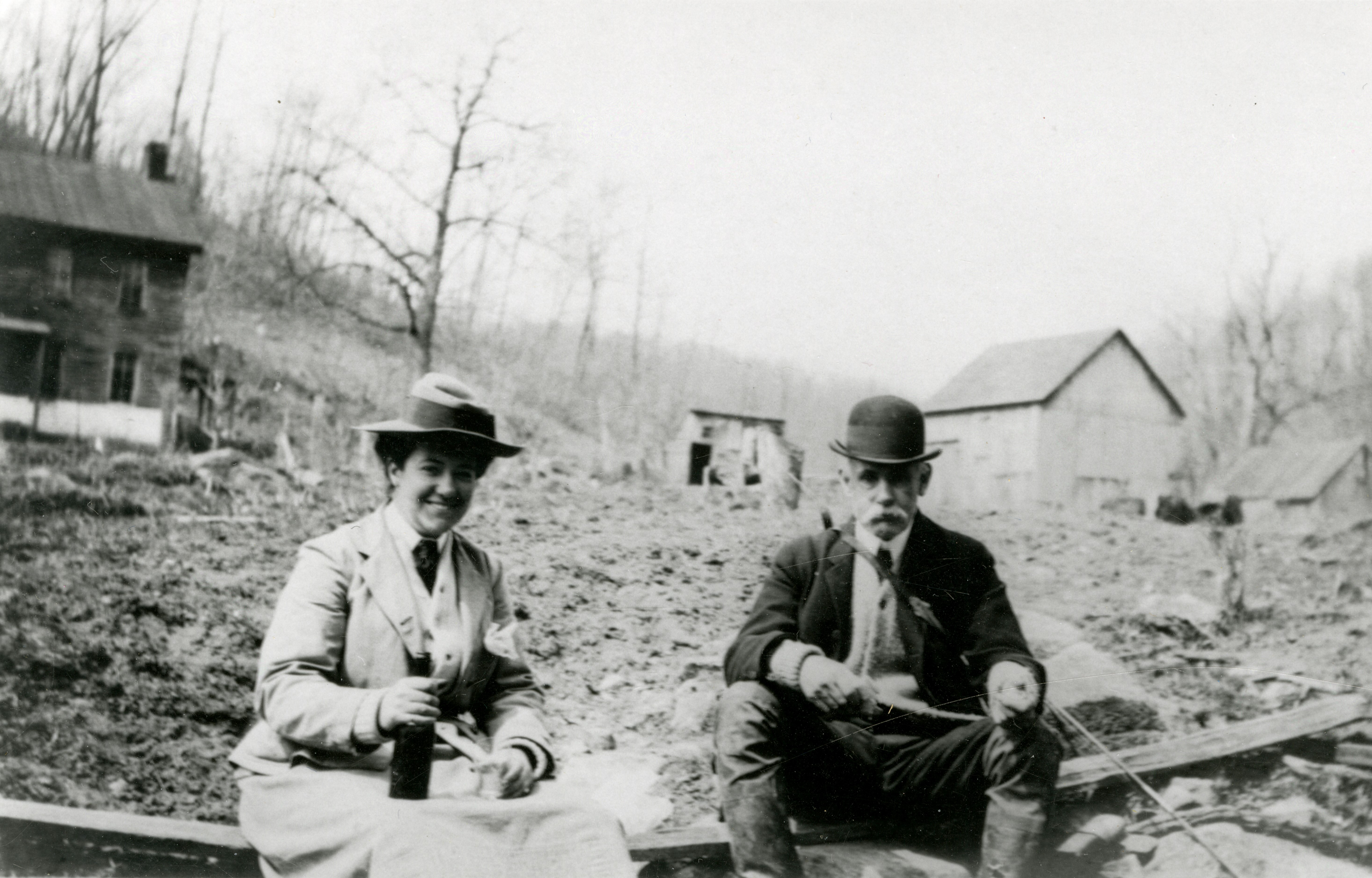
Foster with her father Charles Foster at Skunk's Misery, "her beloved fishing spot" in Mendham, New Jersey

=== Death of Charles Foster ===
When Foster's father fell ill and retired from business, Foster's responsibility to manage the farm increased.

In 1927, Foster's father Charles Grant Foster died at the age of 85; his obituary was published in the Daily Record on August 12, 1927. Caroline Foster inherited the 213.4-acre Fosterfields property and she chose to step into her father's role as the superintendent of the farm; friend claims she "became more outspoken, but in most ways, lived as before."

Assuming control of the farm, she continued to perform physical labor and instructed employees in carpentry. She kept 6 dogs around The Willows mansion, usually mutts and strays.

Foster ensured maintenance of the Reveres' mansion to reflect its 19th-century appearance, including intricate trompe-l'oeil wall murals by Joseph Warren Revere.

Like her father, Foster exhibited frugality in running the farm, despite her wealth. While investing in diversified stock market portfolios, she regularly visited Morristown to demand detailed accountings of her holdings from her banker. Other anecdotes include scavenging used lumber from Epstein's Department Store to build a doghouse and insisting that her relatives should pay for the farm's dairy products like any other consumer.

== Later life and historical preservation ==
In 1955, when Foster was 78, she met Washington Valley historian Barbara Hoskins, who invited Foster to collaborate on Washington Valley: An Informal History. Hoskins asked Foster to record her family's life at Fosterfields and investigate Joseph Warren Revere's life at The Willows mansion. Foster accepted and dedicated herself to this task, hiring an assistant to read documents to her (due to Foster's blindness) and reporting information to Hoskins each day. Hoskins later became a close friend of Foster's.

Published in 1960, when Foster was 83, their collaborative nonfiction book was written, in part to prevent the historic Washington Valley district from being converted into a reservoir by the Morris County Municipal Utilities Authority. Hoskins has stated, "If [Caroline Foster] had lived in another era, she could have been a great lawyer or master mechanic...I never knew anyone like her and I never expect to again."

On March 19, 1958, Foster received a letter from Russell Myers, Secretary-Director of the Morris County Park Commission. In the letter, Myers agreed with her desire to preserve the land and suggested it be donated as a park to the Morris County Park System. This letter "initiated a 20-year friendship" between Foster and Myers, who had weekly tea while discussing the future of the farm and property. Rather than a park, Foster and Myers decided it would be a living museum.

Whereas Foster's collaboration with Hoskins focused on documenting past historic sites, many of which have since been demolished, her friendship with Myers concerned the future of the farm, particularly after her death.

In 1965, she received a permit to purchase a handgun, although she was blind by this time.

Circa 1968, she stated in an interview with Barbara Hoskins,

They expected farm places to smell. Now, nobody can stand a load of manure going by or they can't stand a dog barking or a cow mooing or a chicken crowing. I like those sounds; I think they're homelike. Good manure smell, you can't beat it!

In 1972, she was invited to meet First Lady Pat Nixon at the Seeing Eye because, at 95, Foster was "the oldest Republican Committee woman in Morris County."

In 1972, when she was 95 years old, Foster donated 120 acres of land to the Morris County Park Commission, but she retained the right to hay the field. That year, when a reporter quoted her as having said, "I'm a tough old broad," she responded, "I never use that kind of language! I said 'I'm a tough old bird.'" Despite this, Barbara Hoskins claimed Foster "could swear like a trooper" and had a "tremendous temper."

Circa 1975, Morristown artist Louis Absalon created an oil-painted portrait of Caroline Foster at age 98. It shows her in a gray suit with pocket square, blue plaid bow tie, and hair in a bun before a blue background. The portrait was based on a black-and-white photograph from 1975 that had appeared in a newspaper article announcing Foster's 100th birthday.

Foster continued to live in The Willows and supervise the farmhands until the end of her life.

While writing her will in 1974, Foster arranged to bequeath Fosterfields to the Morris County Park Commission to be preserved as a "living historical farm" – a type of open-air museum. She requested that the property "be kept as simple as possible, and that the natural condition of the property be maintained to the extent possible in order that the wildlife and trees and flowers...may be protected and preserved." Fosterfields became the first living historical farm in New Jersey. The farm presently depicts farm life during the Gilded Age of Morristown.

== Death and legacy ==
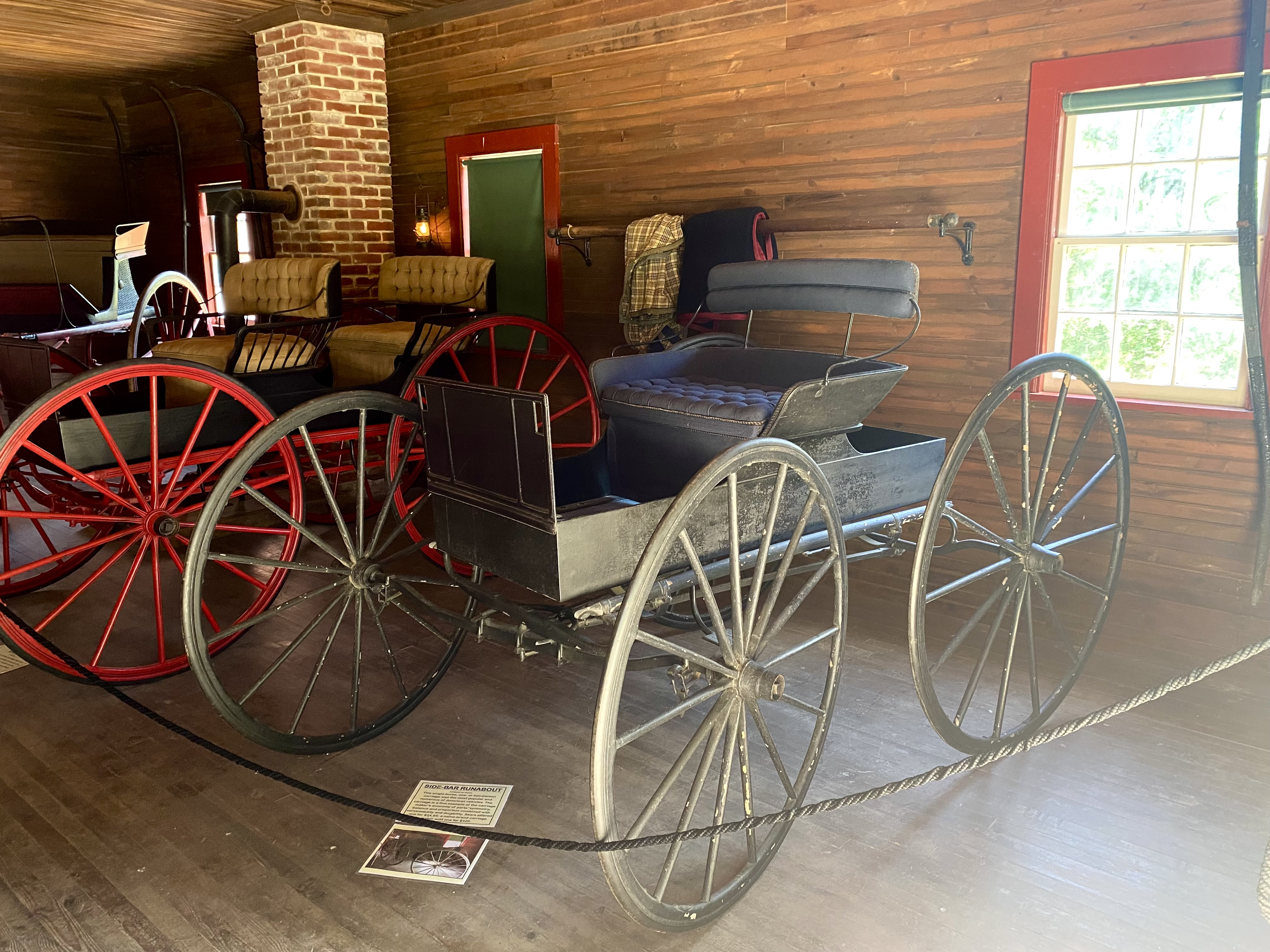
As stipulated in Foster's will, the Carriage House at Fosterfields displays buggies she owned, including this sidebar runabout.

On July 26, 1979, Foster died at 102 years of age. Foster spent 98 of her 102 years at Fosterfields. Her funeral was held on July 29, 1979, at her home.

Upon her death in 1979, she donated "a sizable sum from her estate" to New Jersey's DPH Commission for the Blind and Visually Impaired. She also donated a "substantial endowment" to the Joint Free Public Library of Morristown and Morris Township.

Foster also bequeathed 87 Currier and Ives prints to the New Jersey Historical Society, 37 of which were displayed from March to November 1981 in an exhibit titled "Country and Sporting Life by Currier & Ives." They contained illustrations of ice skating, horse racing, fisticuffs, farm activities, and leisurely country life. These were displayed alongside 10 Currier & Ives prints from the Harry T. Peters Collection, which were on loan from the Museum of the City of New York, including a rare print from the "Life of a Hunter" series.

On April 8, 1980, her friend Ruth Cheney Streeter stated in an interview, "Cara was a character, she enjoyed being a character and we enjoyed her being a character."

In 1986, the Friends of Fosterfields & Cooper Mill was formed to help preserve the farm and honor Foster's memory. Their restoration projects included The Willows, the Temple of Abiding Peace, Foster's original Model T Ford, and the cottage garden. The Friends of Fosterfields also created a documentary titled "Caroline Foster: A Life and Legacy."

In 2010, Fosterfields historian Rebecca Hoskins published a biography of Foster titled Caroline Foster and Fosterfields Living Historical Farm: A Life and a Legacy. A book signing occurred at Fosterfields in April 2011 by author Hoskins. The biography was published by Friends of Fosterfields Living Historical Farm and Cooper Gristmill.

In 2016, the "Friends of Fosterfields" volunteer group celebrated their 30th anniversary by re-planting Caroline Foster's cottage garden to resemble its historic arrangement.

As of 2022, a scholarship named for her, The Caroline Rose Foster Scholarship for Independence and Self-Determination, offers $1,000 to students based on an essay contest and standardized test scores. It is sponsored by the New Jersey Commission for the Blind and Visually Impaired, part of the New Jersey Department of Human Services, to which she donated in 1979.

== See also ==
- Mary Crane Hone (1904–1990), a Morristown actress and political activist who donated her nearby historic Acorn Hall estate in 1973
- Nettie Metcalf (1859–1945), contemporary woman farmer in Ohio
- History of New Jersey
