= Morristown Field Club =

Sports and social club located in Morristown, New Jersey

Coordinates: 40.782003°N 74.478203°W

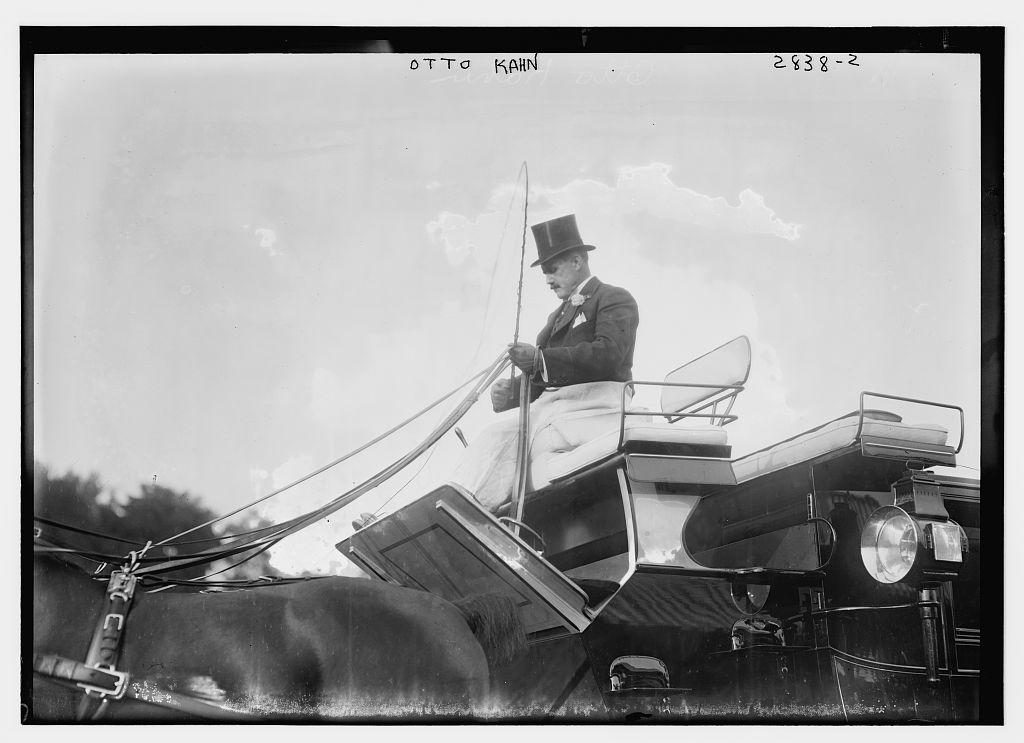
- Otto Hermann Kahn at the Club's horse show on September 25, 1913
- Sport: Tennis
- Founded: 1881

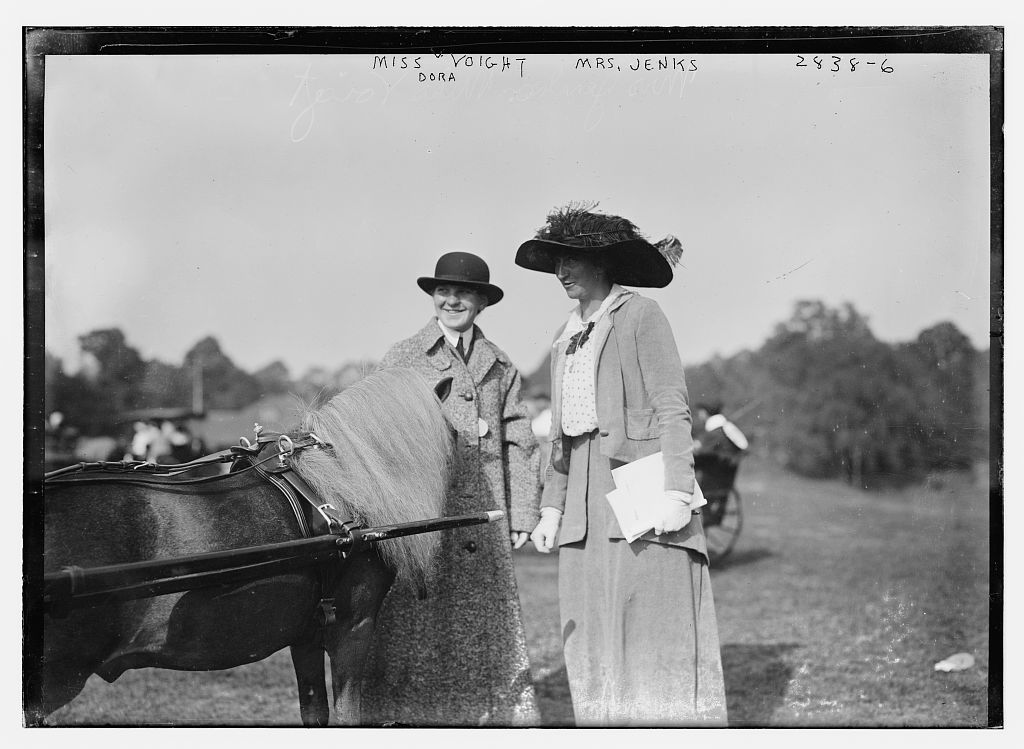
Mrs. Josephine Elizabeth Jenks of Mount Kemble in Morristown; and Miss Dora W. Voight of Green Village, New Jersey at the Morristown Field Club on September 25, 1913

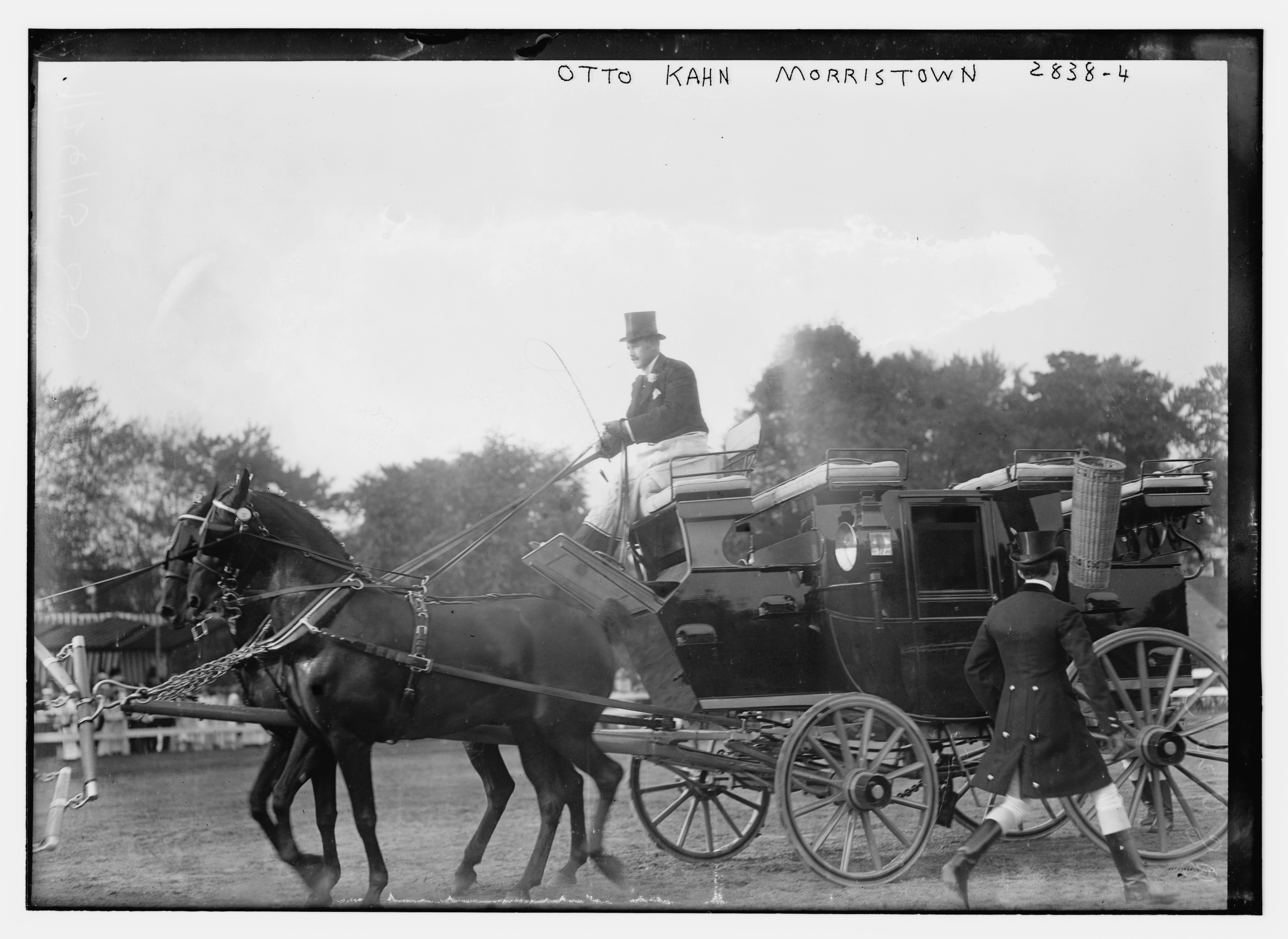
Otto Kahn at the Morristown Field Club on September 25, 1913

The Morristown Field Club is a sports and social club located in Morristown, New Jersey. It was created in 1881 as the Morristown Lawn Tennis Club. It is the third oldest tennis club in New Jersey after the Seabright Lawn Tennis and Cricket Club and the Orange Lawn Tennis Club.

== History ==
In 1893, the club was renamed the Morristown Field Club and offered baseball, football as well as cricket.

In 1895, women were allowed to become members and paid $5 in annual dues. In 1897 an annual horse show was introduced. In 1900 the club joined the New Jersey Lawn Tennis Association, and in 1905 the club hosted the first New Jersey State Tennis Tournament, an event held each year up until 1916. In 1921 the club held a benefit tennis exhibition with Bill Tilden. In 1941 the club moved to 168 James Street. The land was purchased from the widow of Robert D. Foote. A new club house was built and the club switched to tennis as its only sport.

Notable members included Caroline Foster (1877–1979), an American farmer and philanthropist.
