= Bertina Foltz =

American writer

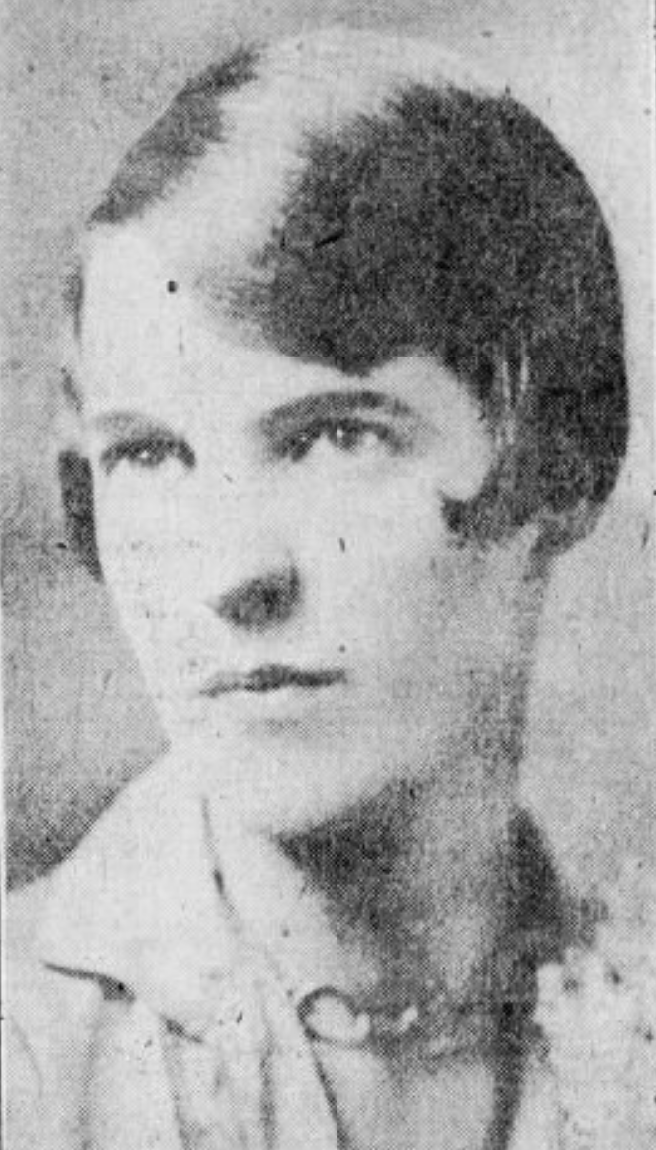
- Foltz, from a 1926 newspaper
- Born: Bertina Louise Foltz; September 30, 1897; Indianapolis, Indiana, US
- Died: October 6, 1940 (age 43); New York City, U.S.
- Other names: Bertina Foltz Smith
- Occupation: Writer

Bertina Louise Foltz Smith (September 30, 1897 – October 6, 1940) was an American writer. She was an associate editor at Vogue magazine, where she wrote about beauty, food and entertaining.

== Early life and education ==
Foltz was born in Indianapolis, Indiana, the daughter of Herbert W. Foltz and Clara Bowen Foltz. Her father and her brother Howard were architects; her mother directed amateur theatricals. She graduated from Tudor Hall School for Girls in 1915, and from Vassar College in 1919.

== Career ==
Foltz was on the editorial staff of Vogue magazine, covering beauty and entertaining, under editor Edna Woolman Chase. She wrote a cookbook with Marjorie Hillis, Corned Beef and Caviar (for the Live-Aloner) (1937). "It replaces motherly advice with humor and dull recipes with concoctions of the modern order," noted one reviewer.

== Publications ==
- For the Hostess (1929)
- "The Gospels of Beauty" (Vogue, 1932)
- "On Her Dressing-Table", "Majoring in Beauty", and "Christmas Carol for the Hostess" (Vogue, 1933)
- "A Contest and a Christening" (Vogue, 1934, with Tina Bailie)
- "In the Good Old Summer-Time" (Vogue, 1935)
- "Discoveries in Beauty" (Vogue, 1937)
- Corned Beef and Caviar (for the Live-Aloner) (1937, with Marjorie Hillis, illustrated by Cipe Pineles)

== Personal life ==
Folz married lawyer Elliott W. Smith in 1927. She died in 1940, at the age of 43, at a hospital in New York City.
