= Newell Dwight Hillis =

American philosopher

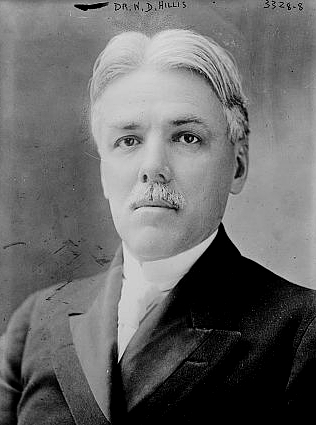
- Hillis circa 1900
- Born: September 2, 1858; Magnolia, Iowa
- Died: February 25, 1929 (aged 70); Bronxville, New York
- Resting place: Kensico Cemetery, Kensico, New York
- Spouse: Annie Louise Patrick Hillis (1862–1930)
- Children: Richard Dwight Hillis (b. 1888); Margaret Louise Hillis Roulston (b. 1899); Nathalie Louise Hillis Kellogg (b. 1900)

Newell Dwight Hillis (September 2, 1858 – February 25, 1929) was a Congregationalist minister, writer, and philosopher from Brooklyn. He served as pastor of the historic Plymouth Church of the Pilgrims in Brooklyn, and he oversaw the completion of the last major renovation of the church.

== Biography ==
Newell Dwight Hillis was born in Magnolia, Iowa, on September 2, 1858. His parents were Samuel Ewing and Margaret (Hester) Hillis. He graduated from Lake Forest University, Illinois, in 1884, and McCormick Theological Seminary in 1887. The same year he was ordained to the Presbyterian ministry. Subsequently, he served as pastor at the First Presbyterian Church, Peoria, Illinois (1886–89); at the First Presbyterian Church, Evanston, Illinois (1889–95); at the Independent Central Church, Chicago, Illinois (1895–1899); and the Plymouth Congregational Church, Brooklyn, New York (1899–1924).

Over his lifetime he delivered approximately 3,500 lectures and published several books, largely on religious and patriotic subjects. Among his writings were Great Books as Life-Teachers: Studies of Character, Real and Ideal (1888), Right Living as a Fine Art (1899), After Sermon Prayers, Lectures and Oration, The Influence of Christ in Modern Life - A study of the New Problems of the Church in American Society (1900), The Quest of John Chapman - The Story of a Forgotten Hero, The Quest of Happiness: A Study of Victories Over Life's Troubles (1902), The Contagion of Character, Studies in Culture and Success (1911), Henry Ward Beecher - A Study of his Live and Influence (1913), Message of David to his Generation (1913), The Blot on the Kaiser's Scutcheon (1918), German Atrocities, Their Nature and Philosophy (1918), The Better America Lectures (1921), and Great men as prophets of a new era (1922).

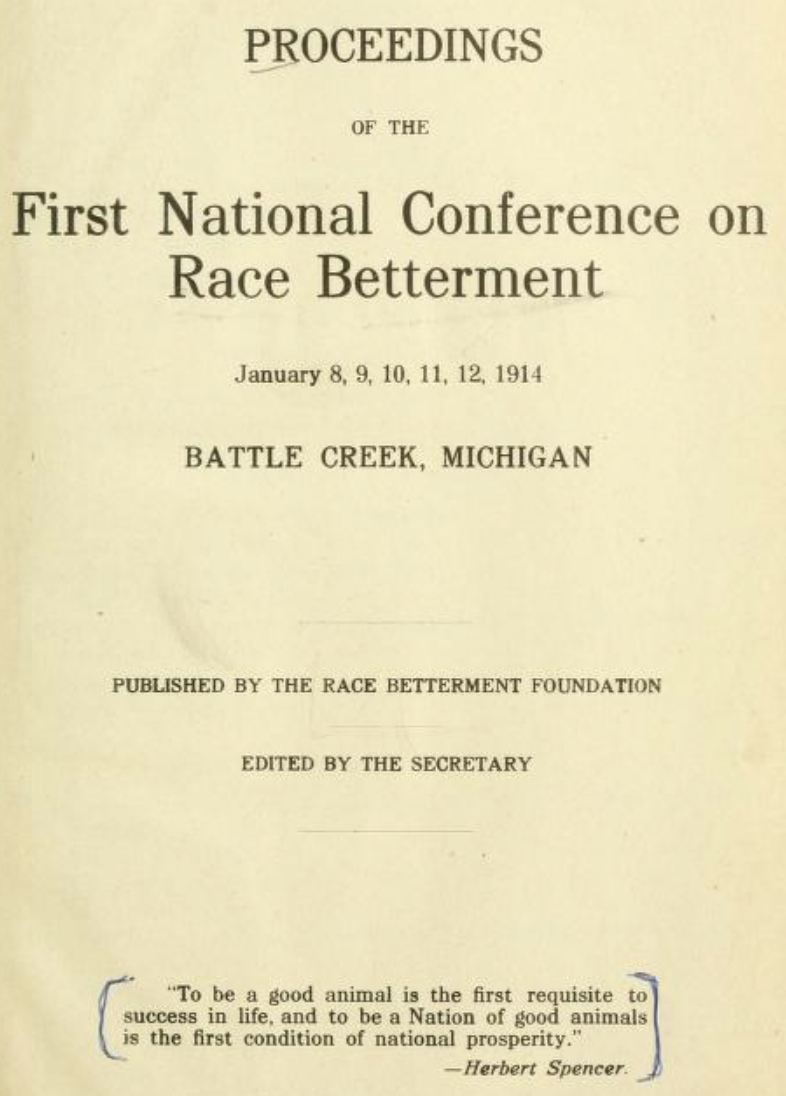
Page from proceedings of the 1914 National Race Betterment Conference.

Hillis died in Bronxville, New York, on February 25, 1929, at age 70, and was buried in Kensico Cemetery, Kensico, New York.

== Controversial views ==
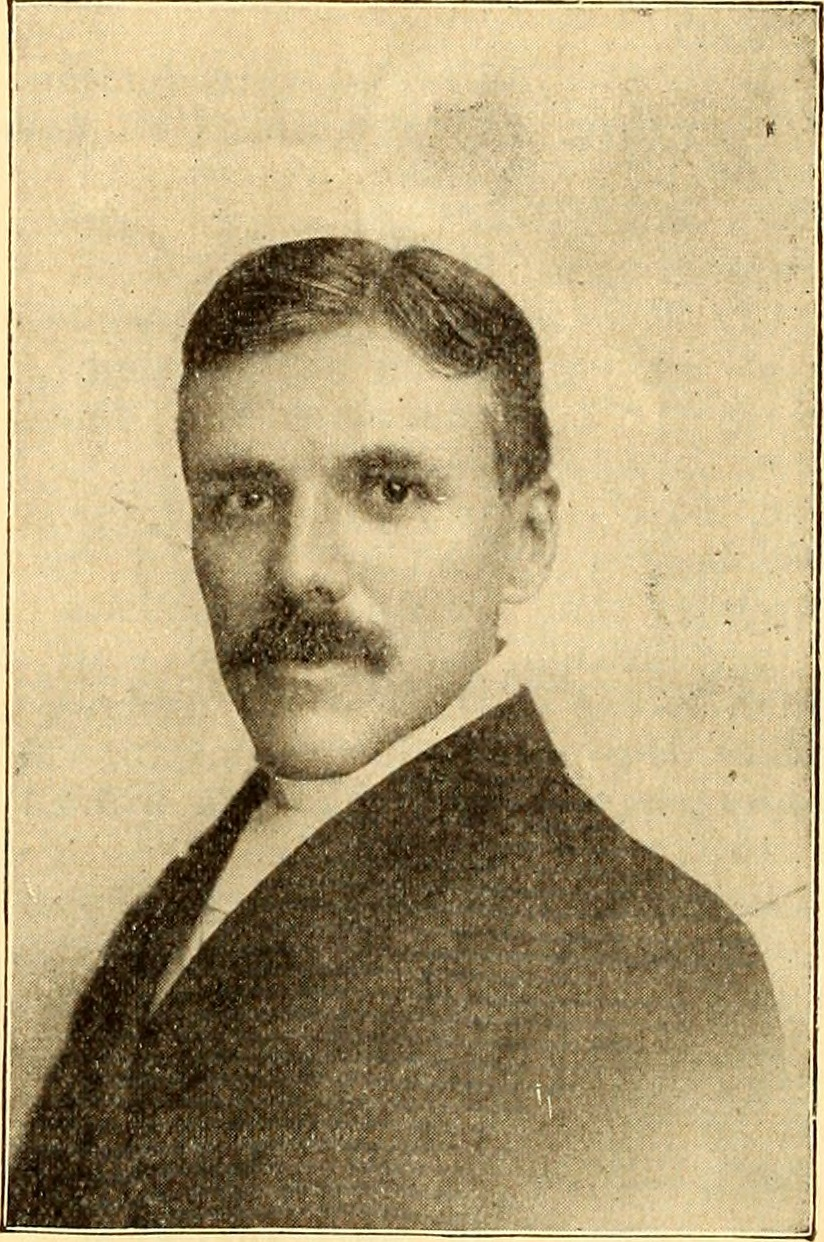
Newell Dwight Hillis

As a minister in a major metropolis, Hillis railed against immorality, and he told reporters in 1900 that "a common whipping post might be very wholesome for New York today." Hillis was upset over what he deemed the immoral behavior found in Broadway plays, in particular the play Sapho, which featured English actress Olga Nethersole in the role of Fanny. The offensive scene involved Fanny being carried up a flight of stairs by a man to whom she was not married, with Fanny discussing her excitement onstage about what might await the couple after they reached the top of the stairs.

Hillis was a supporter of eugenics. With John Harvey Kellogg he organized the first and second National Race Betterment Conferences in 1914 and 1915. As a vice-president of Race Betterment Foundation Hillis was on the executive committee and spoke on the subject of factory degeneration. In 1918, Hillis called for the sterilization of Germans because of the atrocities performed by the German military during World War I.

== Bibliography ==
- Foretokens of Immortality. Fleming H. Revell Company, Chicago New York Toronto, 1897.
- Great Books as Life-Teachers: Studies of Character, Real and Ideal. Fleming H. Revell Company, New York 1898. (Also published by Leopold Classic Library, April 17, 2016)
- Right Living As A Fine Art. Fleming H Revell Company, New York Chicago Toronto, 1899.
- The Influence of Christ in Modern Life. New York: The Macmillan Company, 1900.
- The Quest of Happiness. New York: The MacMillan Company, 1902.
- The Contagion of Character, Studies in Culture and Success. Fleming H. Revell Company, New York 1911.
- The Battle of Principles; a study of the heroism and eloquence of the anti-slavery conflict. Fleming H. Revell Company, New York 1912.
- The Message of David Swing to His Generation: Addresses and Papers. New York: Fleming H. Revell and Company, 1913.
- German Atrocities, Their Nature and Philosophy: Studies in Belgium and France. New York: Fleming H. Revell and Company, 1918.
- The Blot on the Kaiser's 'Scutcheon. New York: Fleming H. Revell and Company, 1918.
- The Better America Lectures. Better America Lecture Service (1921), ASIN: B0010OYR7W.
- Great Men as Prophets of a New Era. Fleming H. Revell Company, New York 1922.
