= Ethel Cutler Freeman =

American amateur anthropologist

- Born: 1886; Morristown, New Jersey, U.S.
- Died: July 14th, 1972 (age 85); Morristown, New Jersey, U.S.
- Education: Miss Dana's School for Young Ladies; Mademoiselle Marie Souvestre's Academy for Girls in England; Columbia University
- Known for: Researching Seminole culture
- Spouse: Leon S. Freeman

Ethel Cutler Freeman (1886 – 14 July 1972) was an American amateur anthropologist and the first female trustee of the American Institute of Anthropology. She is best known for her research of Seminole culture on the Big Cypress Indian Reservation in Henry County, Florida. During her career, she also conducted fieldwork with other Native American communities, including the Arapaho, Shoshoni, Navajo, Hopi, and Kickapoo. She also conducted research among the people of the Virgin Islands, the Bahama Islands, and Haiti as well as the Maasai and Zulu in Africa.

== Early life ==
Ethel Cutler Freeman was born in Morristown, New Jersey in 1886. She attended Miss Dana's School for Young Ladies before studying abroad at Mademoiselle Marie Souvestre's Academy for Girls in England. She married Leon S. Freeman, a New York stockbroker, in 1909 after returning to the United States. Ethel and Leon Freeman had three children, Leon S. Freeman Jr., Mrs. Nicholas Niles of Mendhara, and Mrs. Hugh M. Hyde of Far Hills.

In 1934, Marcellus Hartley Dodge Sr., a former trustee at Columbia University and friend of Freeman suggested that Freeman pursue graduate studies, and Freeman enrolled in graduate courses at Columbia University in philosophy. Freeman soon became interested in anthropology and switched her area of focus to anthropology. During her graduate studies, she conducted fieldwork among the Arapaho and Shoshoni communities in the western United States in 1936.

She joined the American Anthropological Association and became associated with the American Museum of Natural History in 1938, where she would continue to work throughout her career. After completing her graduate studies in anthropology, she decided to pursue ethnographic fieldwork among the Seminole community in southern Florida.

== Anthropological fieldwork ==
Before beginning her research among the Seminole in Florida, Freeman contacted W. Stanley Hanson, Jr. (1883-1945) who had close ties with the Seminole community. Hanson's father was a physician to the Mikasuki-speaking Seminole in Florida. Hanson founded the Seminole Indian Association in Fort Myers in 1913 and was a trusted friend to those Seminole Indians living on the Big Cypress Reservation, a reservation established by the Bureau of Indian Affairs where the Everglades and the Big Cypress Swamp meet. The Big Cypress Reservation was roughly 42,000 acres where Mikasuki- and Muscogee-speaking Seminole lived after Mikasuki-speaking Seminole were removed from drainable land near the Tamami Trail as part of a highway construction project between Miami and Tampa. After repeated correspondence between Hanson and Freeman about her proposed research, Hanson agreed to help connect Freeman with the Seminole community.

Freeman visited the Big Cypress Reservation twice for the American Museum of Natural History with a government representative before conducting a longer period of fieldwork with a Seminole community in the Everglades in the winter of 1940 with her two children, Condict and Leon Jr. Freeman. Freeman continued to conduct fieldwork almost every winter among the Seminole between 1940 and 1943. She became a Special Field Assistant at the American Museum of Natural History in 1940 and received funding from the American Museum of Natural History with the support of Dr. Clark Wissler, then Curator of the Indian Division of the museum. Freeman's fieldwork with the Seminole allowed her to become a consultant to several government agencies and facilitated her later work advocating on behalf of the Seminole.

Freeman grew interested in how Seminole tribes resisted or accepted acculturation, particularly through her studies of the Mikasuki- and Muscogee-speaking Seminole communities. Freeman also studied Seminole religion and traditional myths. She recorded her discussions with Josie Billie related to Seminole religion and magic in private sessions at the Archbold Biological Station in 1954. Josie Billie also collaborated with anthropologist Frances Densmore to record traditional Seminole folk songs, as well as Robert Greenlee. Billie collaborated with Densmore at the Musa Isle Trading Post in 1931 and 1932, recording 63 folk songs. American ethnologist William Sturtevant also recorded Seminole folk songs performed by Billie in 1951. Like Freeman, Sturtevant studied changes in myths related to acculturation and contact with surrounding white settlements.

Between 1944 and 1946, Freeman conducted fieldwork among other tribes in North America, visiting the Southwestern United States and Mexico to study the Arapaho, Shoshone, Navajo, Choctaw, and Hopi tribes. Between 1946 and 1948, Freeman continued her winter field work among the Florida Seminole. At the same time, Freeman also published studies about the Seminole Indians for the Department of Agriculture.

== Advocacy and professional involvement ==
Freeman was an active advocate and consultant on Native American issues. Freeman served as a representative for the American Civil Liberties Union on the National Coordinating Committee for Indian Affairs from 1947 to 1957 and served as a member of the Indians Rights Committee for the American Civil Liberties Union from 1946 to 1966. From 1948 to 1950, Freeman also worked as a member of the Hoover Commission for the Reorganization of Government within the Bureau of Indian Affairs. Freeman became the Acting Chairman of the American Civil Liberties Union in 1955 and remained in that position until 1957.

Freeman was active in several professional anthropological organizations and presented and published her research. Freeman joined the American Anthropological Association in 1938 and the American Ethnological Society in 1943. In 1946, she became a member, and later an executive board member, of the Society of Women Geographers. In 1948, Freeman became the first female trustee of the American Institute of Anthropology and a Field Associate at the American Museum of Natural History.

Freeman published extensively and attended several international professional organization meetings to share her research. She published three articles throughout her fieldwork in the 1940s, including We Live with the Seminoles (1942), The Seminole Woman of the Big Cypress and Her Influence in Modern Life (1944), and Our unique Indians, the Seminoles of Florida (1945). Freeman first presented a paper at the 5th International Congress of Anthropological and Ethnological Sciences in Philadelphia in 1956 titled, "An analysis of a remarkably stable culture now being forced into rapid change." Freeman also delivered a paper, "The Correlation between Directed Culture Change and Self Determination," at the 7th International Congress of Anthropological and Ethnological Sciences in Moscow in 1964, and delivered another talk, "Lawlessness in an Indian Tribe as a Microcosm of a World Trend" at the same conference in Kyoto and Tokyo in 1965.

== Later life ==
Freeman continued to conduct fieldwork later in life among groups in the Caribbean, Africa, and Europe. In 1950, Freeman traveled to Africa to study tribal music and chants of the Maasai and Zulu. In 1952, Freeman also studied the cultures of people in the Virgin Islands and Haiti. Freeman resumed her winter fieldwork with the Florida Seminoles sporadically between 1953 and 1965. At about the same time, in 1950 and 1951, American ethnologist William Sturtevant began conducting fieldwork among the Mikasuki-speaking Seminole communities and in 1952, began conducting fieldwork on the Big Cypress Reservation. Freeman corresponded with Sturtevant between 1953-1956 and 1966 to 1967, even sending him a copy of her paper, "Culture Change and Cultural Stability between the Seminole Indians." Later in 1963, Freeman travelled to Oklahoma to study the Seminole Nation of Oklahoma, which was established in 1956.

In addition to continuing her work among the Seminole, Freeman conducted fieldwork throughout her last few years of life in Portugal. In 1968 and 1972, the American Museum of Natural History funded Freeman to travel to Portugal to study traditional Portuguese clothing. She died later that year on July 14, 1972, in Morristown, New Jersey at the age of 85. Her papers were donated to the National Anthropological Archives shortly after her death, where they are held today as the Ethel Cutler Freeman Papers.

== Selected bibliography ==
- Freeman, Ethel Cutler. "We live with the Seminoles." Natural History, vol. 46 (1942): 226–236.
- Freeman, Ethel Cutler. "The Seminole Woman of the Big Cypress and Her Influence in Modern Life." América Indigena, vol. 4, no. 2 (1944): 123–128.
- Freeman, Ethel Cutler. "Our unique Indians, the Seminoles of Florida." American Indian, vol. 2, no. 2 (1945): 14–28.
- Freeman, Ethel Cutler. "Culture Stability and Change Among the Seminoles of Florida." In Men and Cultures: Selected Papers of the Fifth International Congress of Anthropological and Ethnological Sciences, edited by Anthony F. C Wallace, 249–54. Philadelphia: University of Pennsylvania Press, 1960.
- Freeman, Ethel Cutler. "The Happy Life in the City of Ghosts: An Analysis of a Mikasuki Myth." The Florida Anthropologist 14, no. 1 & 2 (1961): 23–33.
- Freeman, Ethel Cutler. "Directed Culture-Change and Selfdetermination in Superordinate and Subordinate Societies," Proceedings of the 7th International Congress of Anthropological and Ethnological Sciences 4, Moscow (August 1964): 85–90.
- Freeman, Ethel Cutler. "Two Types of Cultural Response to External Pressures Among the Florida Seminoles," Anthropological Quarterly 38, no. 2 (April 1965): 55–61.
- Freeman, Ethel Cutler. "An Early Mikasuki Mortar." Florida Anthropologist 20 (1967): 89–91.
- Freeman, Ethel Cutler. "Lawlessness in an Indian Tribe as a Microcosm of a World Trend," Proceedings of the 8th International Congress of Anthropological and Ethnological Sciences 5, Tokyo and Kyoto (1968): 191–193.
