= Acorn Hall =

Historic house in New Jersey, United States

- U.S. National Register of Historic Places
- New Jersey Register of Historic Places
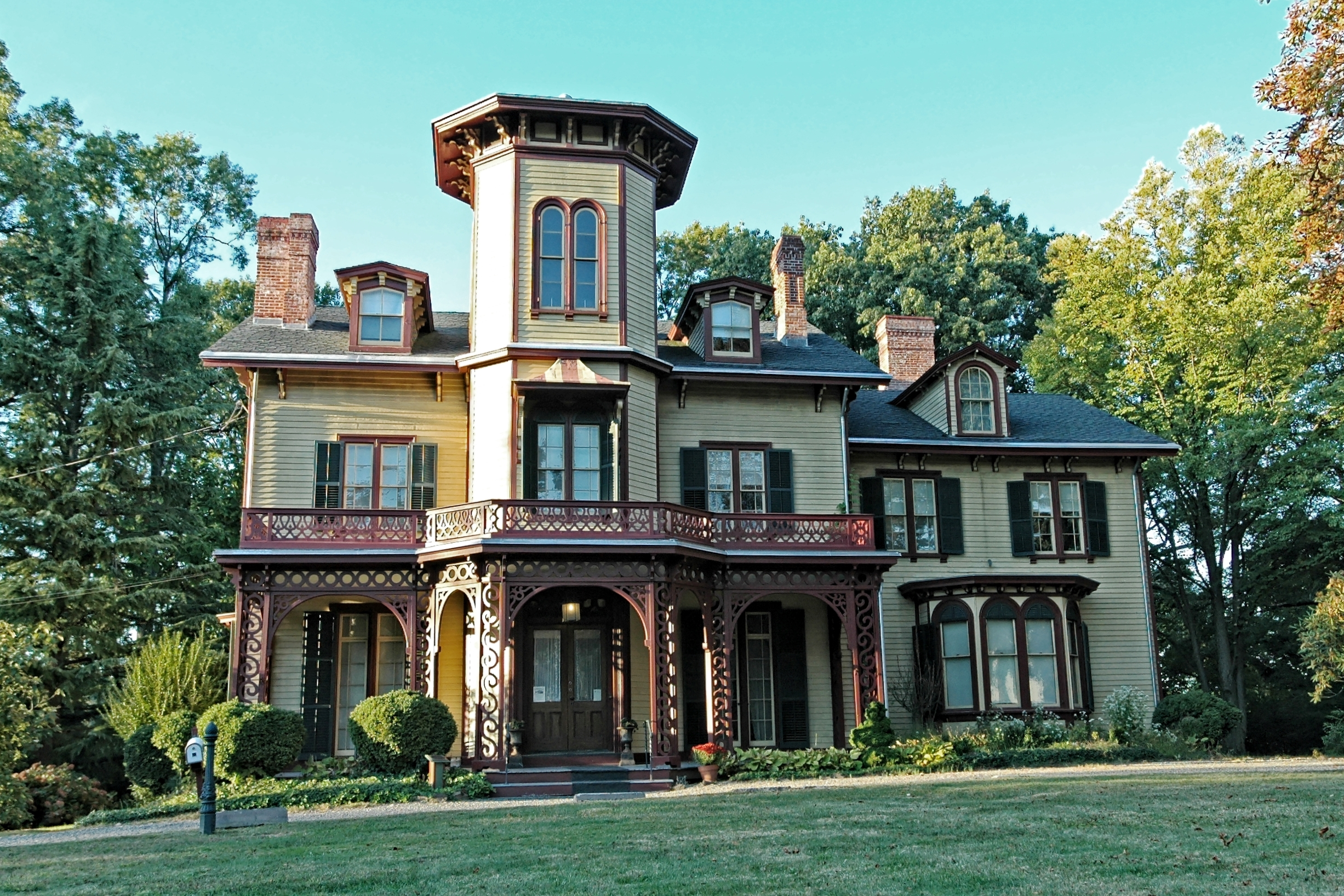

- Location within Morris County, New Jersey Location within New Jersey Location within the United States
- Location: 68 Morris Avenue, Morristown, New Jersey
- Coordinates: 40°47′48″N 74°27′38″W
- Area: 5 acres (2.0 ha)
- Built: 1853
- Architectural style: Italianate
- NRHP reference No.: 73001124
- NJRHP No.: 2182

Significant dates
- Added to NRHP: April 3, 1973
- Designated NJRHP: June 1, 1972

Acorn Hall is an 1853 Victorian Italianate mansion located at 68 Morris Avenue in Morristown, Morris County, New Jersey. It was added to the National Register of Historic Places on April 3, 1973, for its significance in architecture. It serves as the headquarters of the Morris County Historical Society, which operates Acorn Hall as a historic house museum.

After inheriting the property, antiwar activist and actress Mary Crane Hone tried for decades to donate the property for historical preservation, finally succeeding in 1971.

== History ==
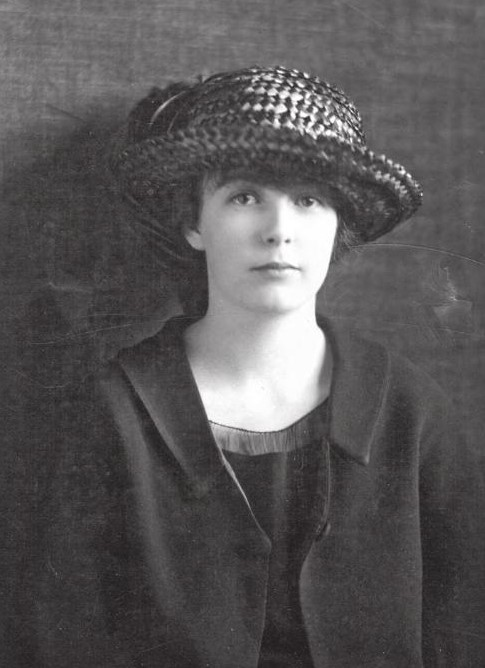
1925 photograph of Mary Crane Hone, who donated the property in 1971

Named for the two-centuries-old oak tree formerly standing on its property, Acorn Hall was built in 1853 by the Schermerhorn family as a simple four-room over four-room farmhouse. Following the death of Mrs. Schermerhorn in 1854, Dr. Schermerhorn put the house and its contents up for sale. It was purchased in 1857 by the Augustus Crane family of New York. The Cranes in 1860 had the house enlarged and remodeled in the then-fashionable Italianate Villa style.

== Legacy ==
After being passed down through several generations, the house was given to the Historical Society in 1971 by antiwar activist, actress, and curator Mary Crane Hone. Hone was the last private resident of the property. Historians have recognized Acorn Hall for its authentic mid-Victorian era furnishings, primarily pieces from the Schermerhorn and Crane-Hone families, supplemented with significant objects from other prominent Morris County families of the 19th century. Carpeting, wall coverings, and decorative paint techniques remain as they were in the nineteenth century.

Acorn Hall also offers an exhibit gallery with changing exhibits highlighting various aspects of Morris County history and Victorian culture.

In addition to the National Register of Historic Places, Acorn Hall is on the New Jersey State Register, and is part of the New Jersey Women's Heritage Trail, in recognition of the importance of the Crane and Hone women in both preservation and the women's suffrage movement. The grounds are also connected to the Morris County Park Commission's Patriot's Path system of trails.

== See also ==
- The Willows at Fosterfields, an 1854 Gothic Revival mansion nearby, built by Joseph Warren Revere and donated by Caroline Foster
- Ford Mansion, a 1774 Georgian-style home nearby
- National Register of Historic Places listings in Morris County, New Jersey
- List of museums in New Jersey
