= Marjorie Hillis =

- Marjorie Hillis in 1937
- Born: 1889; Peoria, Illinois
- Died: 1971 (aged 81–82)
- Education: Miss Dana's School for Young Ladies
- Occupations: Magazine editor, author
- Spouse: Thomas Henry Roulston
- Writing career
- Genre: Women's nonfiction
- Notable works: Live Alone and Like It, Orchids on Your Budget

Marjorie Hillis (1889–1971) was an American author of popular nonfiction books for women in the 1930s. Her book Live Alone and Like It was one of the most popular titles of the decade.

== Early life ==
Born Margaret Louise Hillis in Peoria, Illinois, Marjorie Hillis was the second of three children of Dr. Newell Dwight Hillis (1858-1929), a Congregationalist minister, and Annie Louise Patrick Hillis (1862-1930), herself a published author. The family moved to Brooklyn, New York, in 1899, when Marjorie's father became pastor of Plymouth Congregational Church there, a pulpit once held by the famous abolitionist Henry Ward Beecher. After completing her education at Miss Dana's School for Young Ladies, a private school in New Jersey, and traveling abroad for a year, Marjorie went to work writing captions for Vogue magazine's pattern book.

== Literary career ==
Hillis eventually became Vogue's assistant editor. In 1936, she published the year's number eight nonfiction bestseller, Live Alone and Like It, an advice book for young women on how to live independently. It was followed in 1937 by Orchids on Your Budget, which became that year's number five nonfiction bestseller. Orchids on Your Budget, which was subtitled Live Smartly on What You Have, was built around hypothetical “cases” that encouraged women to match their goals with their financial means. She also co-wrote a cookbook with Vogue associate editor Bertina Foltz, Corned Beef and Caviar (1937).

== Personal life ==
In 1939, Hillis married Thomas Henry Roulston, a widower who owned a chain of grocery stores in Brooklyn. He died in 1949.

Hillis died in 1971. She is buried alongside Roulston at Green-Wood Cemetery in Brooklyn.
