= W. Stanley Hanson =

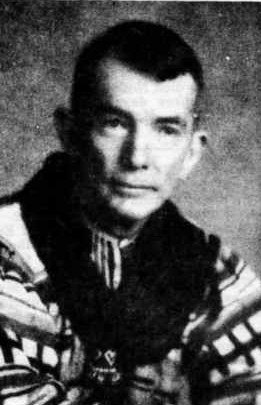
- Born: 1883
- Died: 1945 (aged 61–62)
- Occupations: photographer ethnographer tax collector
- Parents: William Hanson (father); Julia Allen Hanson (mother)

W. Stanley Hanson (1883–1945) was a photographer, ethnographer, and trusted friend of the Miccosukee and Seminole tribes in South Florida. He served as tax collector and commissioner in Lee County, Florida. The Smithsonian Institution has a collection of his photographs. He also wrote about them and collected artworks from the tribes. He served as Federal Inspector of Birds.

His father, William Hanson (1842–1911), was a doctor in Fort Myers, who treated members of the tribe. Dr. William Hanson's wife, Julia Allen Hanson (1843–1934), was also prominent in Fort Myers.

Stanley corresponded with Ernest Coe. He was involved in the development of the Tamiami Trail connecting southwest and south Florida via a road through the Everglades.

His son, W. Stanley Hanson, Jr. died on October 5, 2005. In 1975, he was interviewed about his father's life experiences as well as his own.

Historian Woody Hanson is a descendant of the family.
