= Mary Crane Hone =

American actress, campaign manager, activist and preservationist

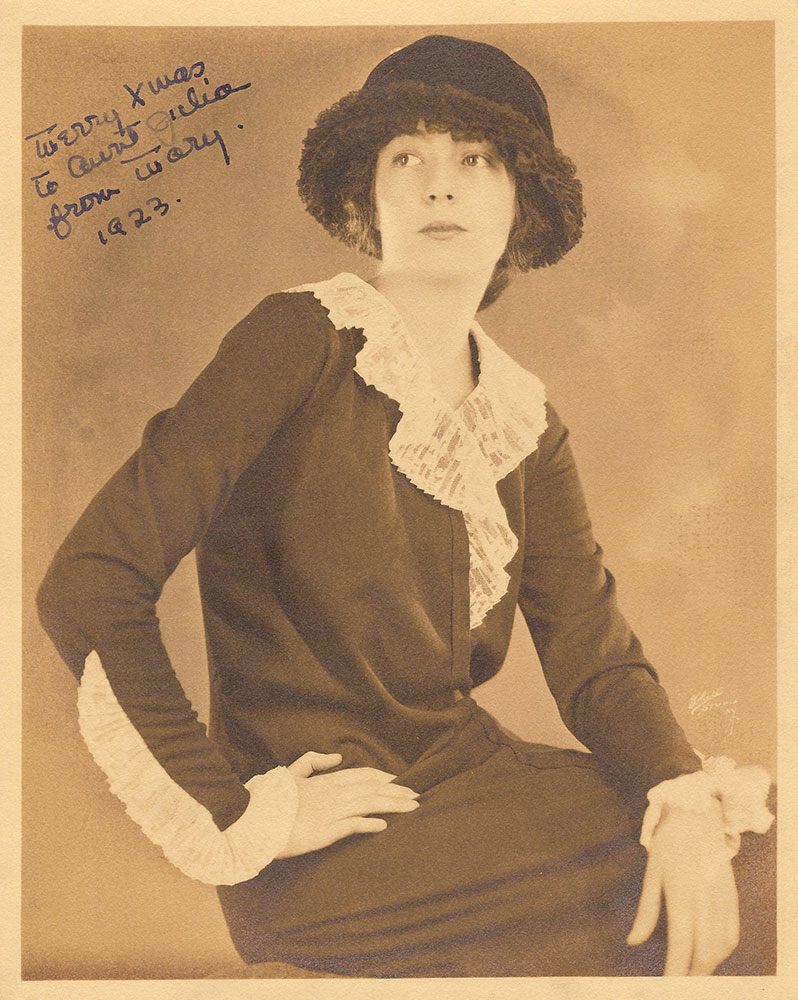
- Born: November 21, 1904; Louisville, Kentucky, United States
- Died: November 27, 1990 (aged 86)
- Known for: Preservation of Acorn Hall; Political activism for the UN; Stage acting on Broadway; Campaigning for the Democratic party

Mary Crane Hone II (November 21, 1904 – November 27, 1990) was an American stage actress, campaign manager, anti-war activist, and historical preservationist. She is best known for preserving Acorn Hall in Morristown, New Jersey.

As a stage actress, Hone starred in lead roles in plays in the United States, Canada, England, and Egypt.

She worked for the BBC and the World Federalist Movement, with a nearly lifelong interest in Democratic campaigning and the United Nations. She campaigned for Franklin D. Roosevelt, Robert B. Meyner, and Adlai Stevenson.

After decades of attempts, Hone was able to preserve her historic estate, Acorn Hall, by donating it to the Morris County Historical Society in 1971. The National Park Service states that "the building's current excellent state of preservation is due largely to [Hone's] efforts".

== Early life and education ==
Hone was born on November 21, 1904, in Louisville, Kentucky. She was the only child of engineer Augustus Crane Hone and historical preservationist Alice Castleman Hone. Since 1857, her family owned the Acorn Hall mansion in Morristown, New Jersey.

In 1916, her family moved to New York, but Hone frequently visited Morristown.

In 1920, Hone attended the Democratic National Convention in San Francisco, California with her mother and grandmother. After the 1920 passage of the 19th Amendment, this was the first year women could vote. Since her youth, Hone was interested in the League of Nations (founded in 1920), which was a predecessor to the UN.

In 1921, Hone graduated from Rosemary Hall in Greenwich, Connecticut. She decided to be an actress, with her mother Alice Castleman Hone as her manager. Morris County Historical Society curator Anne Motto claims, "Alice steadfastly insisted to the media that her daughter would not enter the lowly movie industry." Instead, the two of them sailed to England where Hone attended the Royal Academy of Dramatic Arts. Hone then returned to New York to embark on her "15-year Broadway career".

== Acting ==
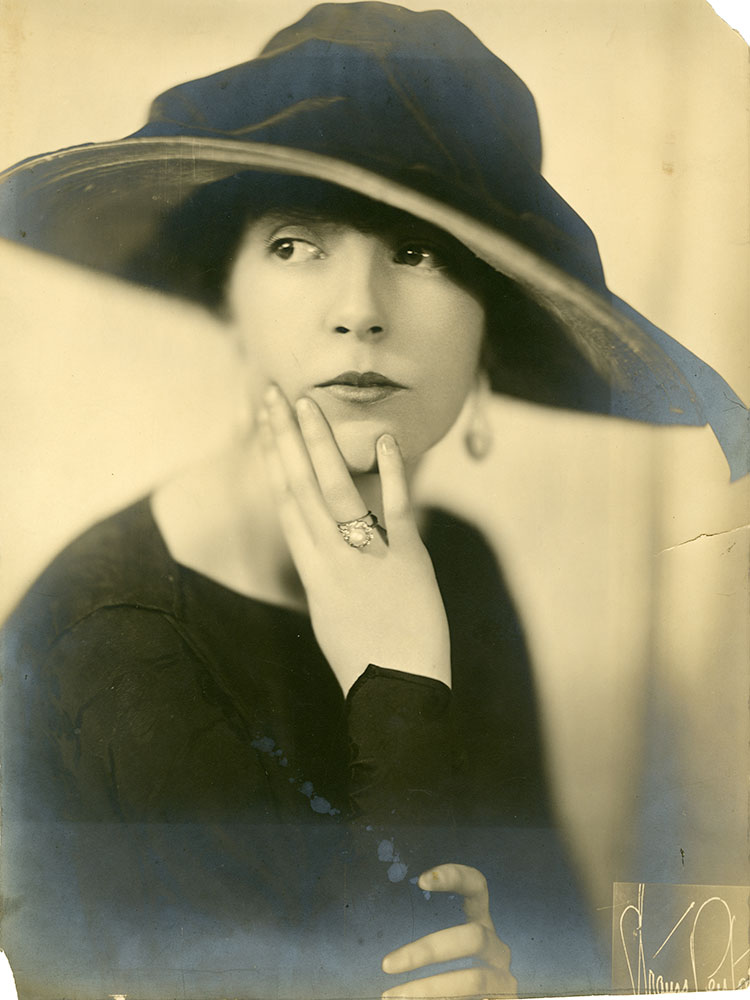
A headshot of Hone during her Broadway debut

On October 9, 1922, Hone had a lead role as Helena the Robot in Czech science fiction play R. U. R. at New York's Garrick Theatre. Hone previously starred in Othello as Desdemona.

By 1937, Hone was no longer focusing on acting in favor of political activism. She moved back to Morristown in 1939.

According to historian Jude Pfister,

She knew she had talent. She knew she was photogenic, and I think she knew she had some inherent drawbacks. As an actress, she was her own worst critic. She was almost David Letterman-esque in being self-deprecating. Though she wasn't self-conscious of her lineage, she certainly was self-conscious of her accent. In one letter she compared her language to what she would have heard from African Americans in the cornfields when she was growing up.

== Career and activism ==
In 1941, she was working for the BBC's New York office as a secretary. This job allowed her to attend three international conferences, including the 1945 United Nations Conference on International Organization in San Francisco.

In 1944, she wrote piano march "Let's Re-Re-Re-Elect Roosevelt", a campaign song supporting Franklin D. Roosevelt's fourth term. It was published by Finger Lakes Press in Auburn, New York. An excerpt of its lyrics are viewable online.

In a 1946 resume to join the UN, Hone describes part of her acting career:

An excursion to England hellbent to play Shakespeare and succeeding in doing so with an oldfashioned [sic] repertory company in Egypt. Back to N.Y. again due to family pressure and the lead on Broadway in Ibsen's Lady from the Sea, a 'distinguished flop'; and a play written for me about a witch, also a flop.

c. 1946, she moved to Washington, D.C. to work for World Federalist radio commentator Raymond Graham Swing. However, she moved back to Morristown likely to care for her ailing mother; during this time, she continued to work for the World Federalist Movement, working for the branch in New Jersey. Hone's mother died in December 1949. That year, Hone moved to Amsterdam for 8 months to work for the Dutch branch of the World Federalist Movement. In 1950, she also worked with both Democratic and Republican politicians as part of NJ's United World Federalists branch.

By this time, Hone had become from a Southern Democrat (anti-Lincolnian) to a New Deal Democrat, coinciding with the overall parties' platform switch.

In 1953, Hone campaigned for Democrat Robert B. Meyner, who achieved the position of New Jersey governor in 1954. Hone held Meyner's victory reception at her home, Acorn Hall. In 1956, Hone campaigned for Adlai Stevenson, who lost in a second landslide to Dwight D. Eisenhower.

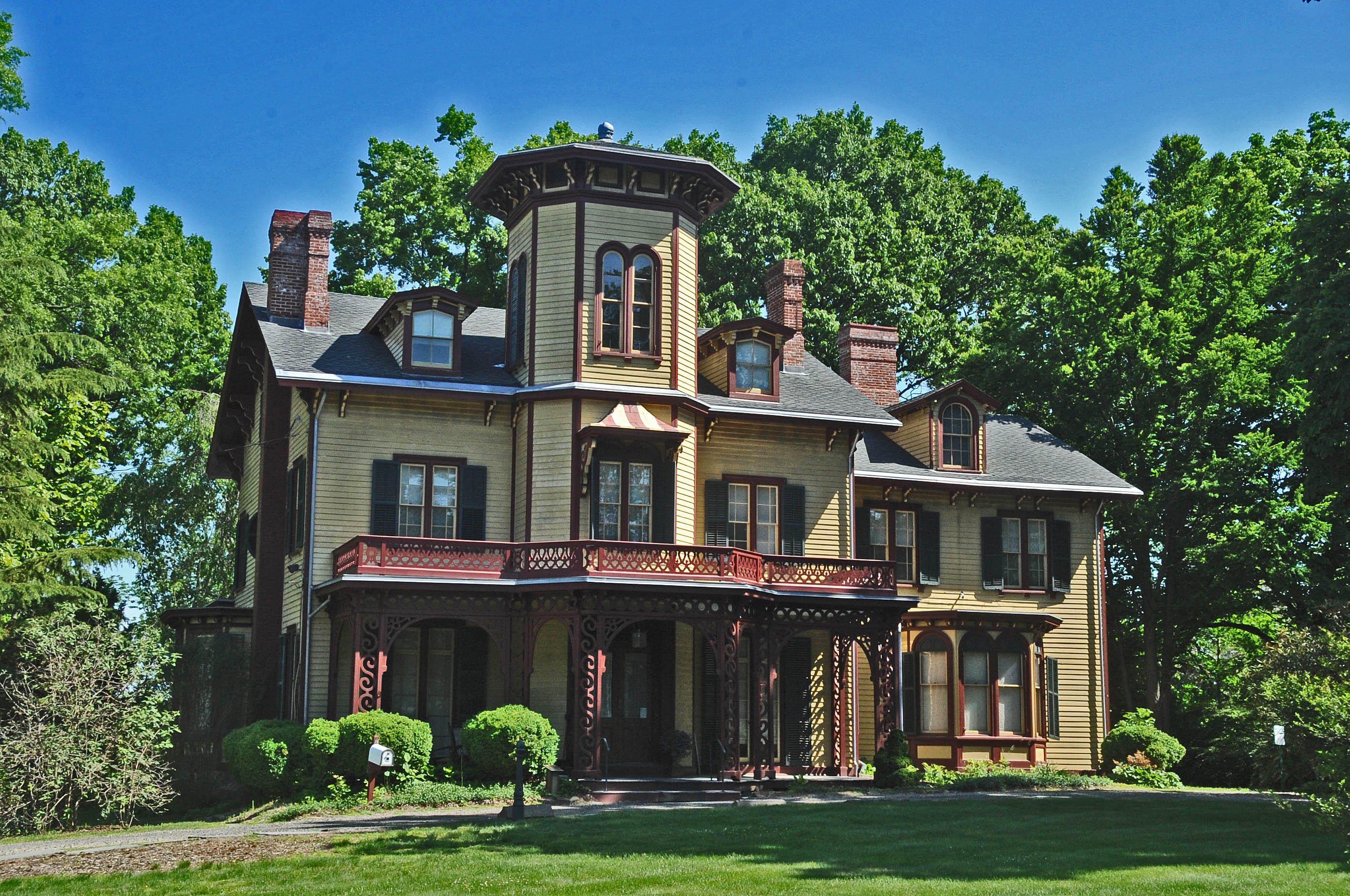
Hone's estate, Acorn Hall

Meanwhile, in the spring of 1953, Hone met with Morristown mayor William Parsons Todd to discuss how her mansion, Acorn Hall, could become property of the town and therefore a house museum. She hoped to complete this arrangement before 1955, so that she could accept the UN's job offer to move abroad to Turkey. Hone details her situation in a thank-you letter to the mayor:

I very much appreciated your taking the time and interest to come here and discuss with me the proper disposition of this house. As you know I earnestly hope that a way can be devised whereby it can be to the town's benefit to take it over.

Since talking to you I have been asked to take a job with a projected U.N. Economic Commissioner in Turkey. This would mean leaving the country for two years. Naturally the idea is quite tempting to me, but I have explained that I could not possibly give an answer until I was certain I had left things properly settled at home. This means mainly the question of the house.

I am advised by friends and my lawyer, Horace Jeffers, to investigate the historical museum field for possible custodians...

Around 1953, when Morristown declined to take ownership of Acorn Hall, she turned down the UN job and continued her mission to preserve Acorn Hall. From this point onwards, she became increasingly interested in the Morris County Historical Society.

On April 9, 1966, at the age of 61, Hone and friend Elizabeth Cooke climbed into a bulldozer scoop to protest Interstate 287's inevitable destruction of local and historical properties. Despite their demonstration, 287 was still completed. This unsuccessful campaign likely inspired Hone to officially join the Morris County Historical Society in 1967.

In 1968, she made plans to donate Acorn Hall to the Morris County Historical Society, and Hone officially bequeathed the property in 1971. Hone entrusted Morristown historian and friend, Patricia Eldredge, to preserve the Hall. Hone donated the entire property along with furniture, family heirlooms, papers, and photographs. After this, Hone retired to Nantucket, Massachusetts.

Hone died in Nantucket on November 27, 1990.

== Legacy ==
Acorn Hall opened as a museum in 1973. It continues to be preserved as a historic house museum as of 2022.

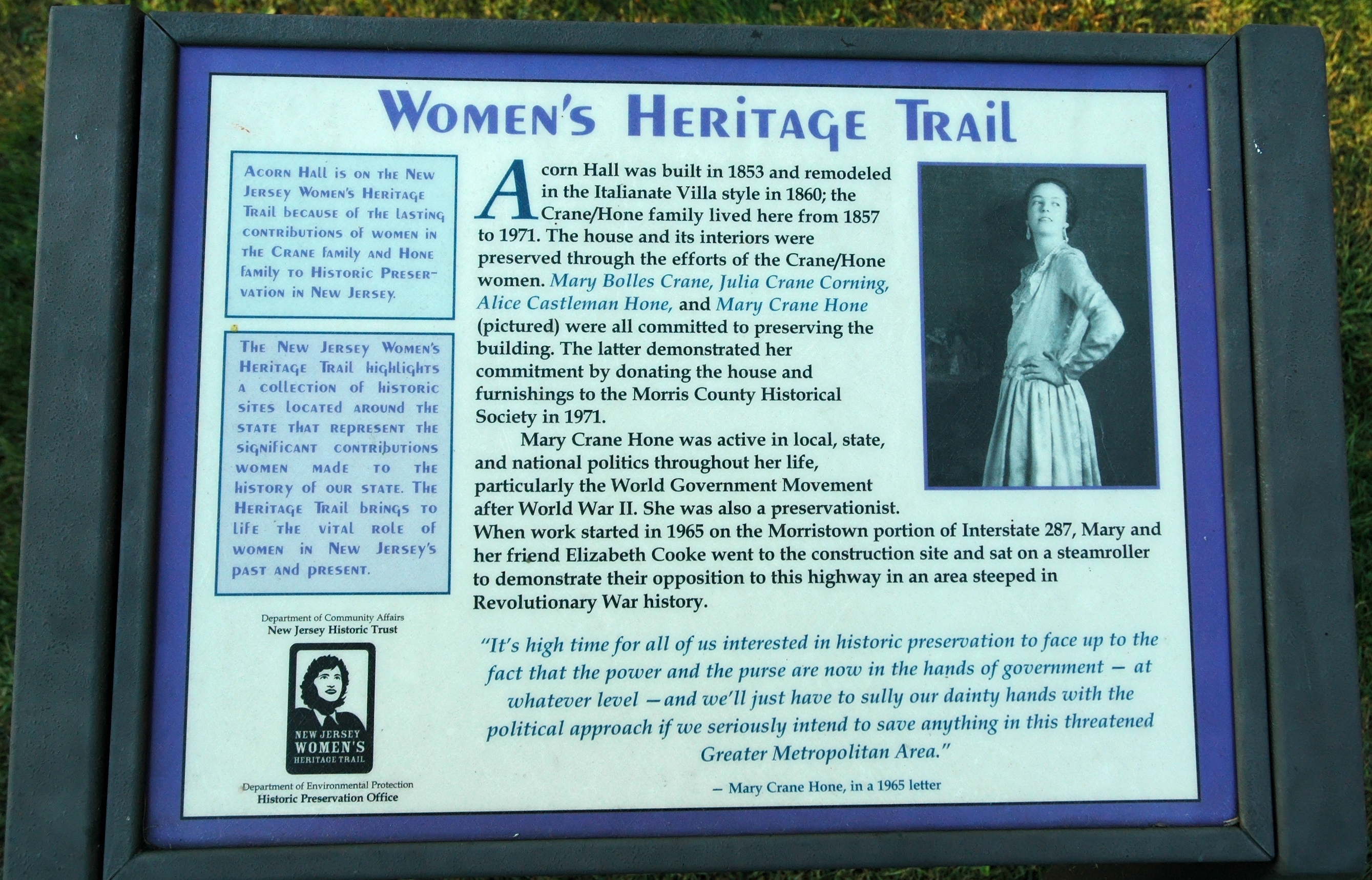
A placard about Acorn Hall, featuring a summary of Hone's contributions

== See also ==
- Caroline Rose Foster (1877–1979), contemporaneous Morristown farmer who donated her nearby Fosterfields estate to the Morris County Park Commission
