= Normandy Park =

Normandy Park may refer to:

- Normandy Park, New Jersey, residential area in Morris County, New Jersey
  - Normandy Park Historic District, listed on the NRHP in Morris County, New Jersey
- Normandy Park, Washington, city in King County, Washington
