= Morris Township, New Jersey =

Township in Morris County, New Jersey, US

- Township
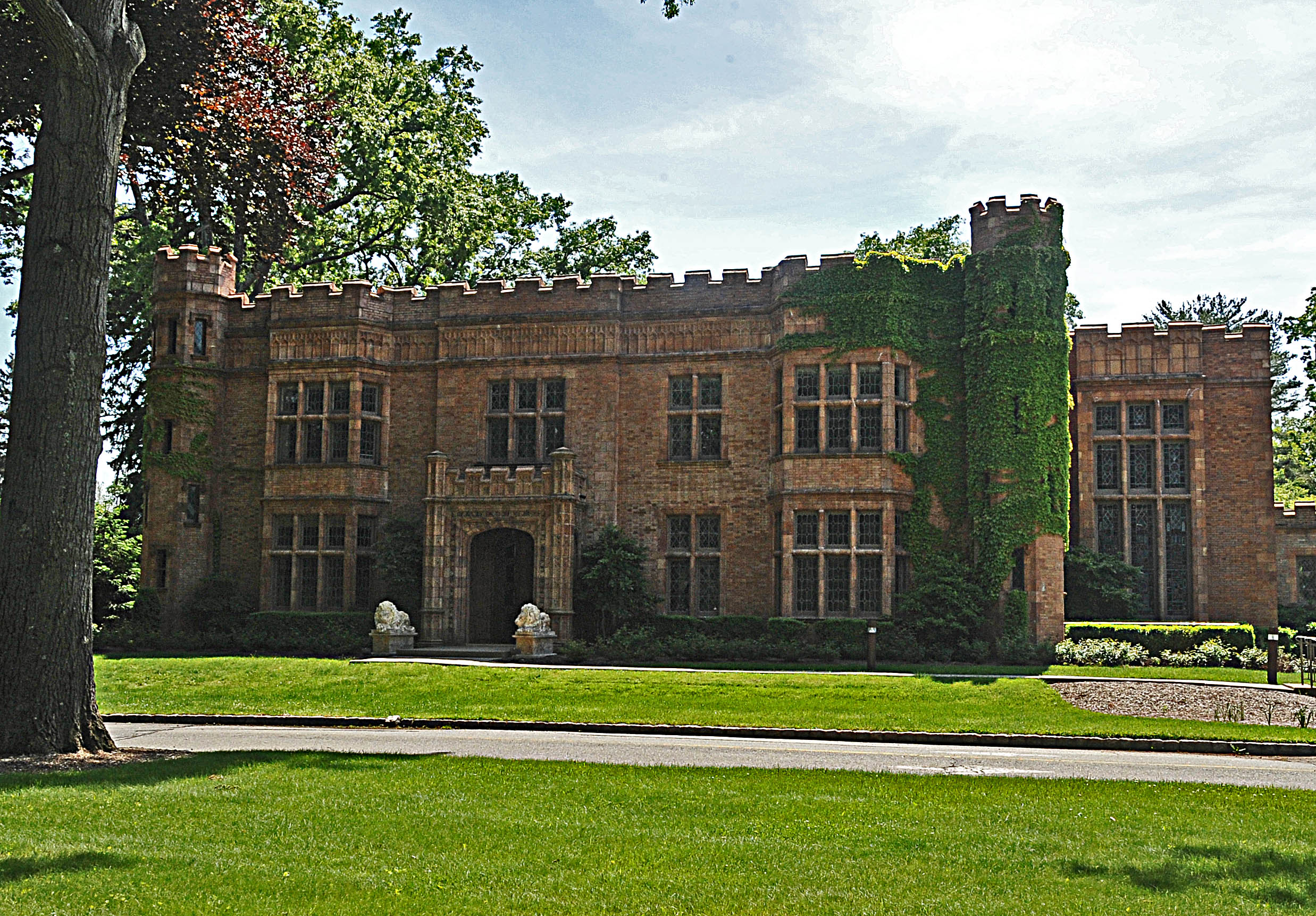
- Alnwick Hall

- Seal
- Motto: A community rich in history with a constant striving for a better tomorrow.
- Location of Morris Township in Morris County highlighted in red (right). Inset map: Location of Morris County in New Jersey highlighted in orange (left).

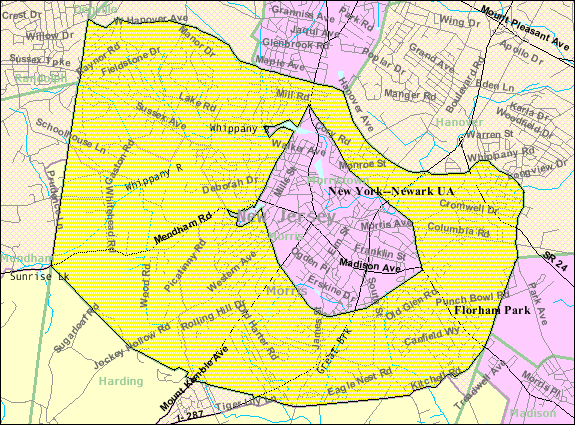
- Census Bureau map of Morris Township, New Jersey

- Location in Morris County Location in New Jersey Location in the United States
- Coordinates: 40.796095°N 74.494556°W
- Country: United States
- State: New Jersey
- County: Morris
- Formed: March 25, 1740
- Incorporated: February 21, 1798
- Named for: Lewis Morris

Government
  - Type: Township
  - Body: Township Committee
  - Mayor: Donna Guariglia (D, term ends December 31, 2025)
  - Administrator: Timothy Quinn
  - Municipal clerk: Suzanne Walsh

Area
  - Total: 15.81 sq mi (40.96 km^{2})
  - Land: 15.68 sq mi (40.62 km^{2})
  - Water: 0.13 sq mi (0.34 km^{2}) 0.83%
  - Rank: 171st of 565 in state 13th of 39 in county
- Elevation: 433 ft (132 m)

Population (2020)
  - Total: 22,974
  - Estimate (2023): 23,507
  - Rank: 116th of 565 in state 5th of 39 in county
  - Density: 1,465/sq mi (566/km^{2})
  - Rank: 338th of 565 in state 19th of 39 in county
- Time zone: UTC−05:00 (Eastern (EST))
  - Summer (DST): UTC−04:00 (Eastern (EDT))
- ZIP Code: 07960 – Morristown; 07961 – Convent Station
- Area code: 973
- FIPS code: 3402748090
- GNIS feature ID: 0882193
- Website: www.morristwp.com

Morris Township is a township in Morris County, in the U.S. state of New Jersey. As of the 2020 United States census, the township's population was 22,974, an increase of 668 (+3.0%) from the 2010 census count of 22,306, which in turn reflected an increase of 510 (+2.3%) from the 21,796 counted in the 2000 census. The township was named for Lewis Morris, colonial governor of New Jersey.

Located along the Morris and Essex Lines, the township is a wealthy bedroom community, with many residents traveling to work in nearby New York City on NJ Transit which provides commuters with direct access to New York Penn Station and to Hoboken Terminal.

The township is the "doughnut" around Morristown and completely surrounds it, with at least five times the area, though near Morris Plains the width of Morris Township is less than a mile. For 115 years, Morristown was part of Morris Township. The initial separation of Morristown from Morris Township occurred on April 6, 1865. A confusing state of affairs followed for nearly thirty years. On February 18, 1895, the separation was officiated.

Morris Township is home to the Morris County Golf Club and the Morris Museum, which is the second largest museum in New Jersey and has been in operation since 1913. The township is also home to the Morristown National Historical Park which in 1933 became the country's first National Historical Park.

== History ==
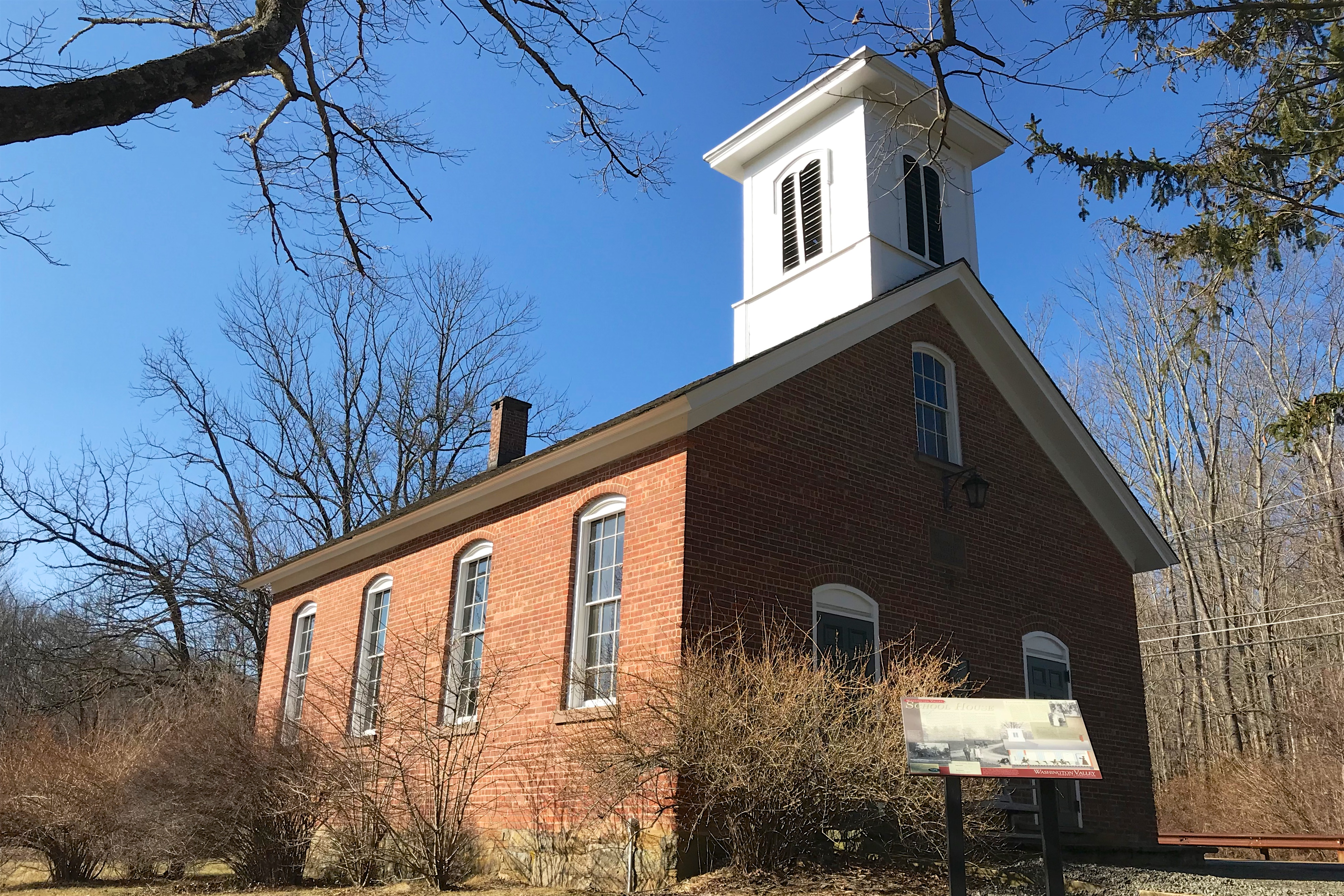
Washington Valley Schoolhouse

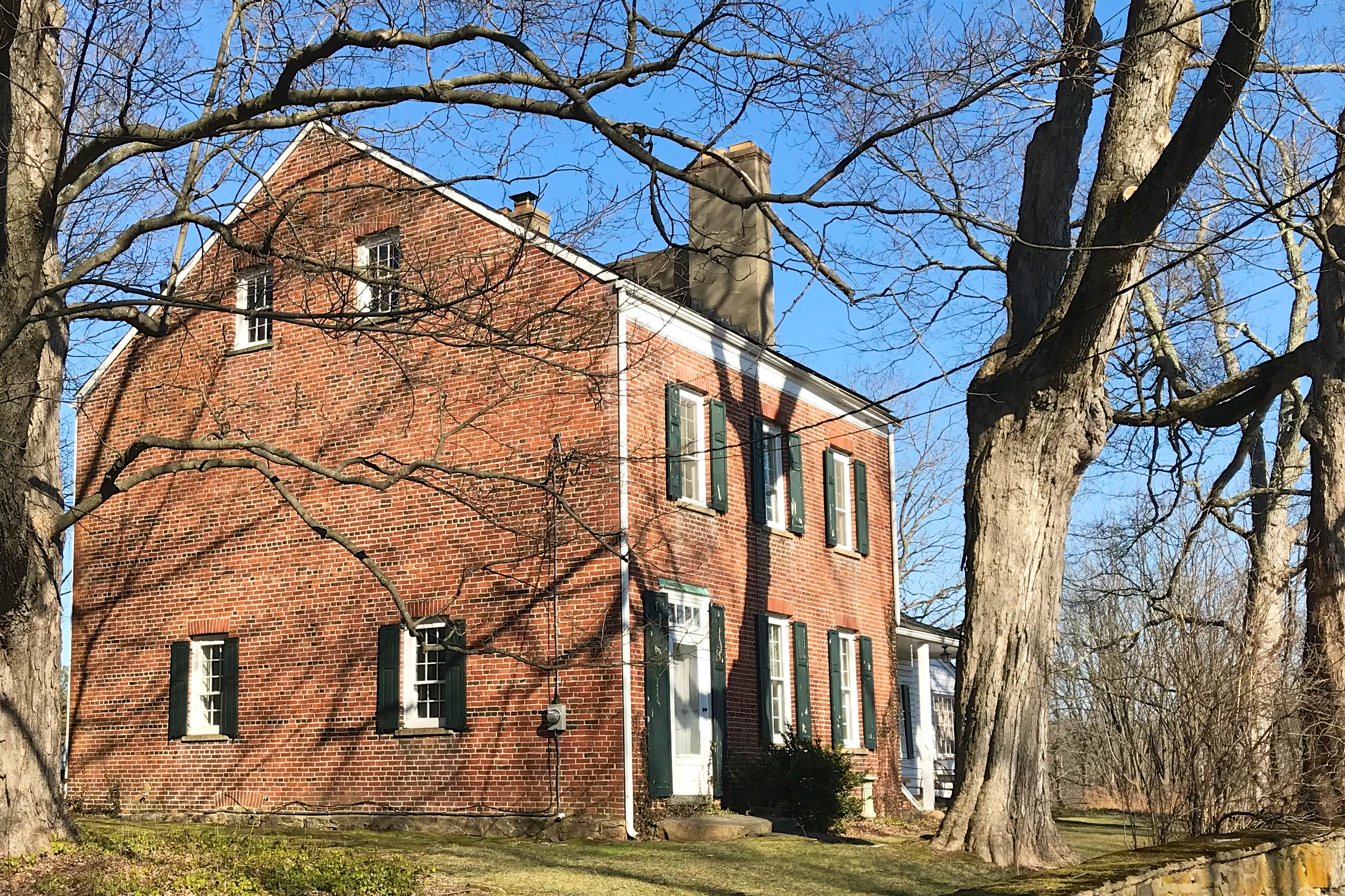
John Smith House

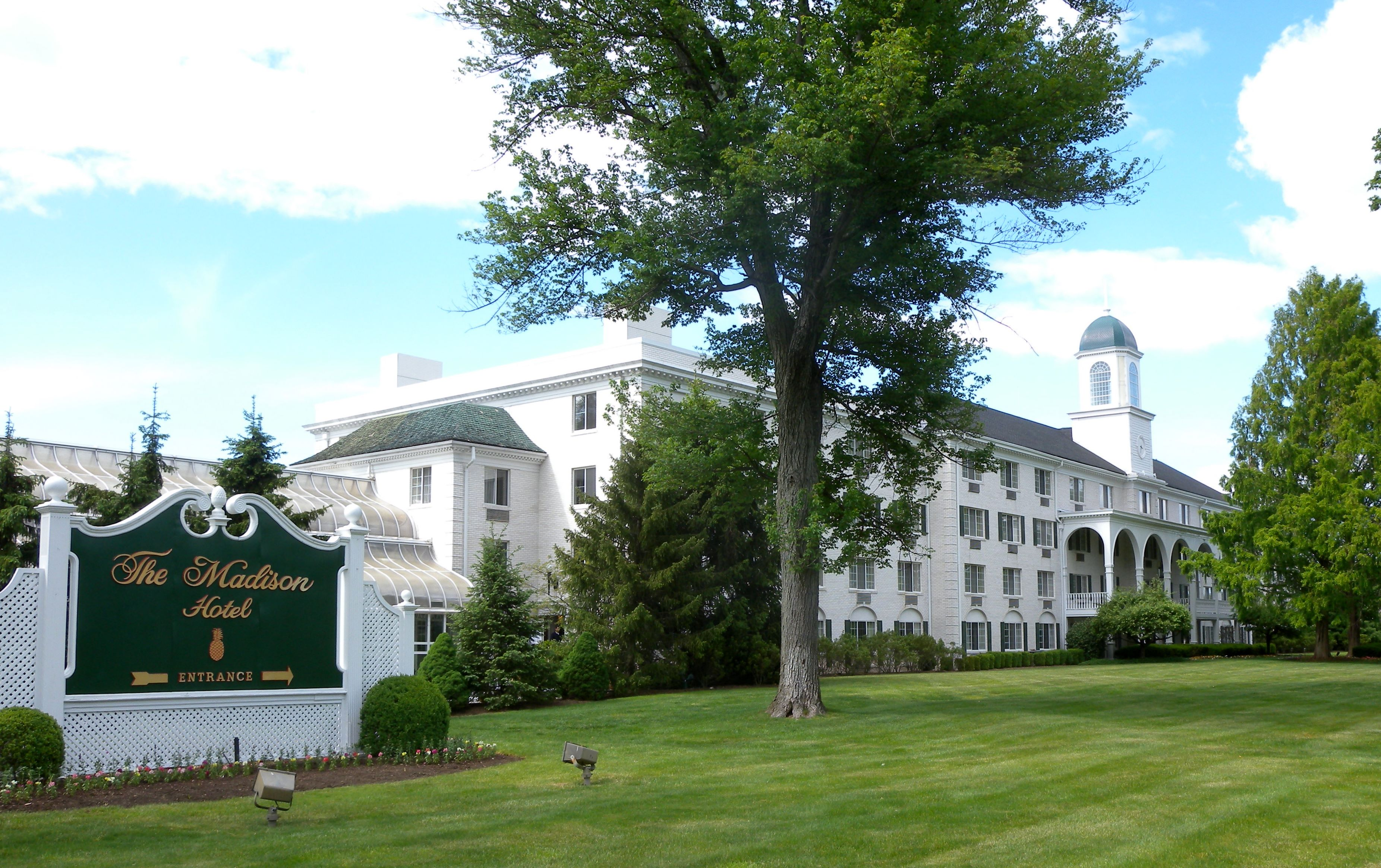
Madison Hotel in Convent Station

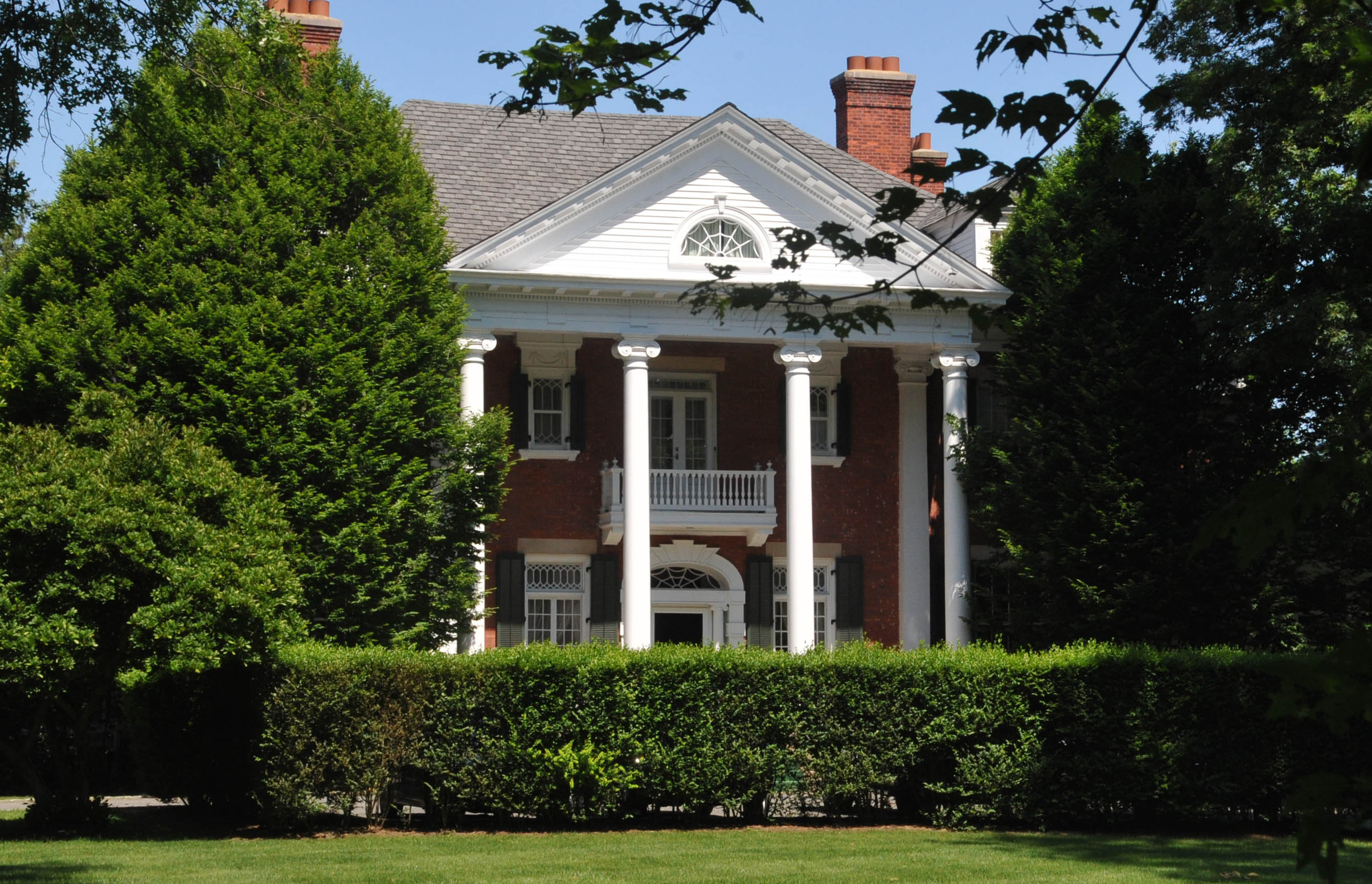
Normandy Park Historic District

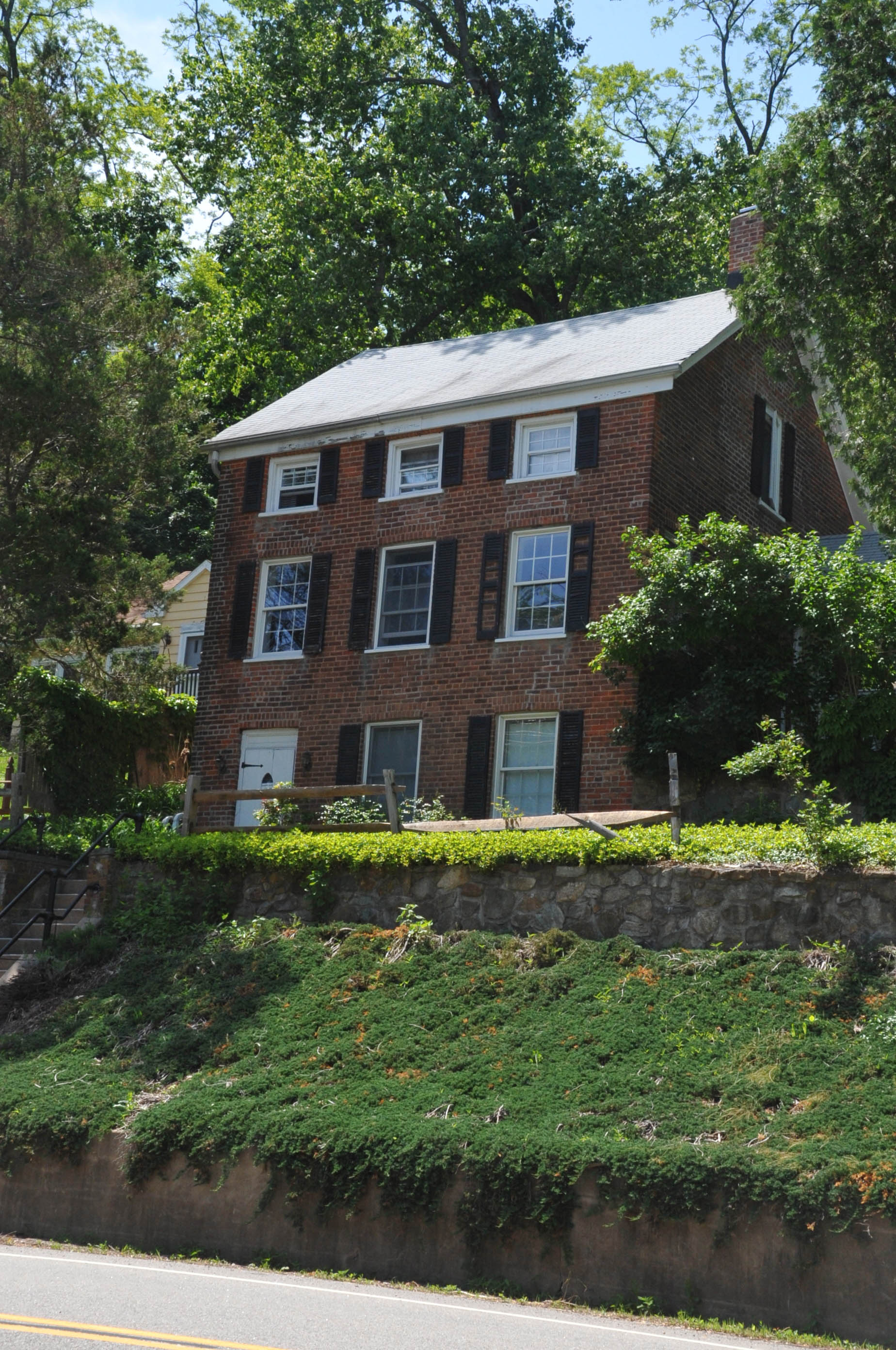
Pruddentown Historic District

=== Incorporation ===
Morris Township was originally formed as of March 25, 1740. The township was named for Lewis Morris, colonial governor of New Jersey.

Portions of the township were taken on December 24, 1740, to form Roxbury Township and on March 29, 1749, to form Mendham Township. Morris Township was incorporated as a township by the Township Act of 1798 by the New Jersey Legislature on February 21, 1798, as part of the state's initial group of 104 townships.

Portions of the township were later taken to create Chatham Township (February 12, 1806), Morristown (April 6, 1865, fully independent in 1895) and Passaic Township (on March 23, 1866, now Long Hill Township).

On September 22, 1860, the Jerseyman reported:

The total population of Morris Township is 6,024, being an increase of 1,032 since 1850 and of 348 since 1855. Number of families 1,147; Dwellings 1,124; Farms 256; Churches 11, viz., 3 Presbyterian, 3 Methodist, 2 Episcopalian, 1 Baptist, 1 Roman Catholic, 1 African. Deaths during the year 67. Raised last year 9,191 bushels of Wheat, 5,649 of Rye, 64,808 of Oats, 118,245 of Corn, 7,262 tons of Hay and 8,730 lbs. of Tobacco; and 92,366 lbs. of Butter were made. There are in the Township 1,642 Horses, 36 Mules, 1500 Cows, 200 Oxen, 1100 Young Cattle, 1262 Sheep and 1600 Swine.

=== Washington Valley Historic District ===
Many historic properties are in the encompassing Washington Valley Historic District. It was added to the National Register of Historic Places in November 1992. Notable sites located in Washington Valley include the Washington Valley Schoolhouse and the John Smith House. Parts of the district are within neighboring Mendham Township.

=== Convent Station ===
The community of Convent Station is named after the Convent Station railroad station that was constructed there during the 1870s to serve the 200-acre (0.81 km^{2}) complex of the Academy of Saint Elizabeth, a Catholic school operating under the auspices of the Roman Catholic Diocese of Paterson.

Notable neighborhoods include Bradwahl, Cromwell Hills, and the Normandy Park Historic District. The Morris Township Municipal Building and the Morris Township Police Headquarters are located in Convent Station. The community is home to the Morris County Golf Club and the Morris Museum.

=== Sidney Reso kidnapping ===
In 1992, Arthur Seale and his wife kidnapped Exxon executive Sidney Reso, a township resident, from his home. The Seales' sought a ransom of $18.5 million, but Reso died in captivity. The case received nationwide attention.

== Geography ==
According to the United States Census Bureau, the township had a total area of 15.81 square miles (40.96 km^{2}), including 15.68 square miles (40.62 km^{2}) of land and 0.13 square miles (0.34 km^{2}) of water (0.83%).

Unincorporated communities, localities and place names located partially or completely within the township include Convent Station, Gillespie Hill, Loantaka Terrace, Normandy Heights, Normandy Park and Washington Valley.

Morris Township completely surrounds Morristown, making it part of 21 pairs of "doughnut towns" in the state, where one municipality entirely surrounds another. The township borders the Morris County municipalities of Denville Township, Parsippany–Troy Hills, Morris Plains and Hanover Township to the north, Harding Township to the south, Mendham Township and Randolph to the west and Florham Park and Madison to the east.

== Demographics ==
Historical population
Census	Pop.	Note	%±
1810	3,753	*	—
1820	3,524		−6.1%
1830	3,536		0.3%
1840	4,013		13.5%
1850	4,992		24.4%
1860	5,985		19.9%
1870	5,674		−5.2%
1880	1,419	*	−75.0%
1890	1,999		40.9%
1900	2,571		28.6%
1910	3,161		22.9%
1920	2,824	*	−10.7%
1930	5,565		97.1%
1940	6,107		9.7%
1950	7,432		21.7%
1960	12,092		62.7%
1970	19,414		60.6%
1980	18,486		−4.8%
1990	19,952		7.9%
2000	21,796		9.2%
2010	22,306		2.3%
2020	22,974		3.0%
2023 (est.)	23,507		2.3%
Population sources: 1810–1920; 1840 1850–1870 1850; 1870 1880–1890; 1890–1910 1910–1930; 1940–2000 2000; 2010 2020 * = Lost territory in previous decade.

=== 2020 census ===
The 2020 United States census counted 22,974 people, 8,172 households, and 6,111 families in Morris Township. The population density was 1,465.2 per square mile (565.6/km^{2}). There were 8,498 housing units at an average density of 542.0 per square mile (209.2/km^{2}). The racial makeup was 76.82% (17,648) white, 4.64% (1,066) black or African-American, 0.21% (49) Native American or Alaska Native, 5.98% (1,373) Asian, 0.04% (10) Pacific Islander, 3.63% (833) from other races, and 8.68% (1,995) from two or more races. Hispanic or Latino of any race was 8.0% (1,793) of the population.

Of the 8,172 households, 28.2% had children under the age of 18; 64.4% were married couples living together; 22.0% had a female householder with no husband present. Of all households, 21.4% comprised individuals and 10.8% had someone living alone who was 65 years of age or older. The average household size was 2.6 and the average family size was 3.0.

19.0% of the population was under the age of 18, 7.7% from 18 to 24, 19.4% from 25 to 44, 31.9% from 45 to 64, and 19.0% who were 65 years of age or older. The median age was 46.4 years. For every 100 females, the population had 93.4 males. For every 100 females ages 18 and older, there were 91.2 males.

The 2016–2020 5-year American Community Survey estimates show that the median household income was $160,611 (with a margin of error of +/- $15,788) and the median family income was $191,722 (+/- $15,040). Males had a median income of $90,208 (+/- $20,972) versus $60,833 (+/- $8,436) for females. The median income for those above 16 years old was $70,712 (+/- $6,520). Approximately, 2.3% of families and 5.0% of the population were below the poverty line, including 4.6% of those under the age of 18 and 5.3% of those ages 65 or over.

=== 2010 census ===
The 2010 United States census counted 22,306 people, 8,128 households, and 5,771 families in the township. The population density was 1,428.3 per square mile (551.5/km^{2}). There were 8,502 housing units at an average density of 544.4 per square mile (210.2/km^{2}). The racial makeup was 85.28% (19,022) White, 5.65% (1,261) Black or African American, 0.10% (23) Native American, 5.12% (1,141) Asian, 0.03% (6) Pacific Islander, 1.99% (444) from other races, and 1.83% (409) from two or more races. Hispanic or Latino of any race were 7.55% (1,683) of the population.

Of the 8,128 households, 31.0% had children under the age of 18; 61.3% were married couples living together; 7.3% had a female householder with no husband present and 29.0% were non-families. Of all households, 23.9% were made up of individuals and 10.1% had someone living alone who was 65 years of age or older. The average household size was 2.58 and the average family size was 3.08.

22.6% of the population were under the age of 18, 6.3% from 18 to 24, 23.7% from 25 to 44, 29.9% from 45 to 64, and 17.4% who were 65 years of age or older. The median age was 43.3 years. For every 100 females, the population had 97.0 males. For every 100 females ages 18 and older there were 94.4 males.

The Census Bureau's 2006–2010 American Community Survey showed that (in 2010 inflation-adjusted dollars) median household income was $132,191 (with a margin of error of +/− $7,204) and the median family income was $154,265 (+/− $8,489). Males had a median income of $108,448 (+/− $5,932) versus $64,753 (+/− $12,368) for females. The per capita income for the borough was $65,335 (+/− $4,396). About 1.0% of families and 3.9% of the population were below the poverty line, including 1.0% of those under age 18 and 10.3% of those age 65 or over.

The township has been one of the state's highest-income communities. Based on data from the 2006-2010 American Community Survey, Morris Township had a per capita income of $65,335 (ranked 36th in the state), compared to per capita income in Morris County of $47,342 and statewide of $34,858.

=== 2000 census ===
As of the 2000 United States census there were 21,796 people, 8,116 households, and 5,949 families residing in the township. The population density was 1,383.0 inhabitants per square mile (534.0/km^{2}). There were 8,298 housing units at an average density of 526.5 per square mile (203.3/km^{2}). The racial makeup of the township was 88.63% White, 5.46% African American, 0.15% Native American, 3.90% Asian, 0.01% Pacific Islander, 0.91% from other races, and 0.95% from two or more races. Hispanic or Latino of any race were 3.81% of the population.

There were 8,116 households, out of which 31.2% had children under the age of 18 living with them, 64.6% were married couples living together, 6.8% had a female householder with no husband present, and 26.7% were non-families. 21.8% of all households were made up of individuals, and 7.6% had someone living alone who was 65 years of age or older. The average household size was 2.55 and the average family size was 2.99.

In the township the population was spread out, with 22.7% under the age of 18, 5.8% from 18 to 24, 28.2% from 25 to 44, 27.9% from 45 to 64, and 15.4% who were 65 years of age or older. The median age was 41 years. For every 100 females, there were 89.4 males. For every 100 females age 18 and over, there were 64.9 males.

The median income for a household in the township was $101,902, and the median income for a family was $116,866. Males had a median income of $80,946 versus $50,864 for females. The per capita income for the township was $54,782. About 2.1% of families and 3.8% of the population were below the poverty line, including 4.9% of those under age 18 and 5.1% of those age 65 or over.

== Culture and tourism ==
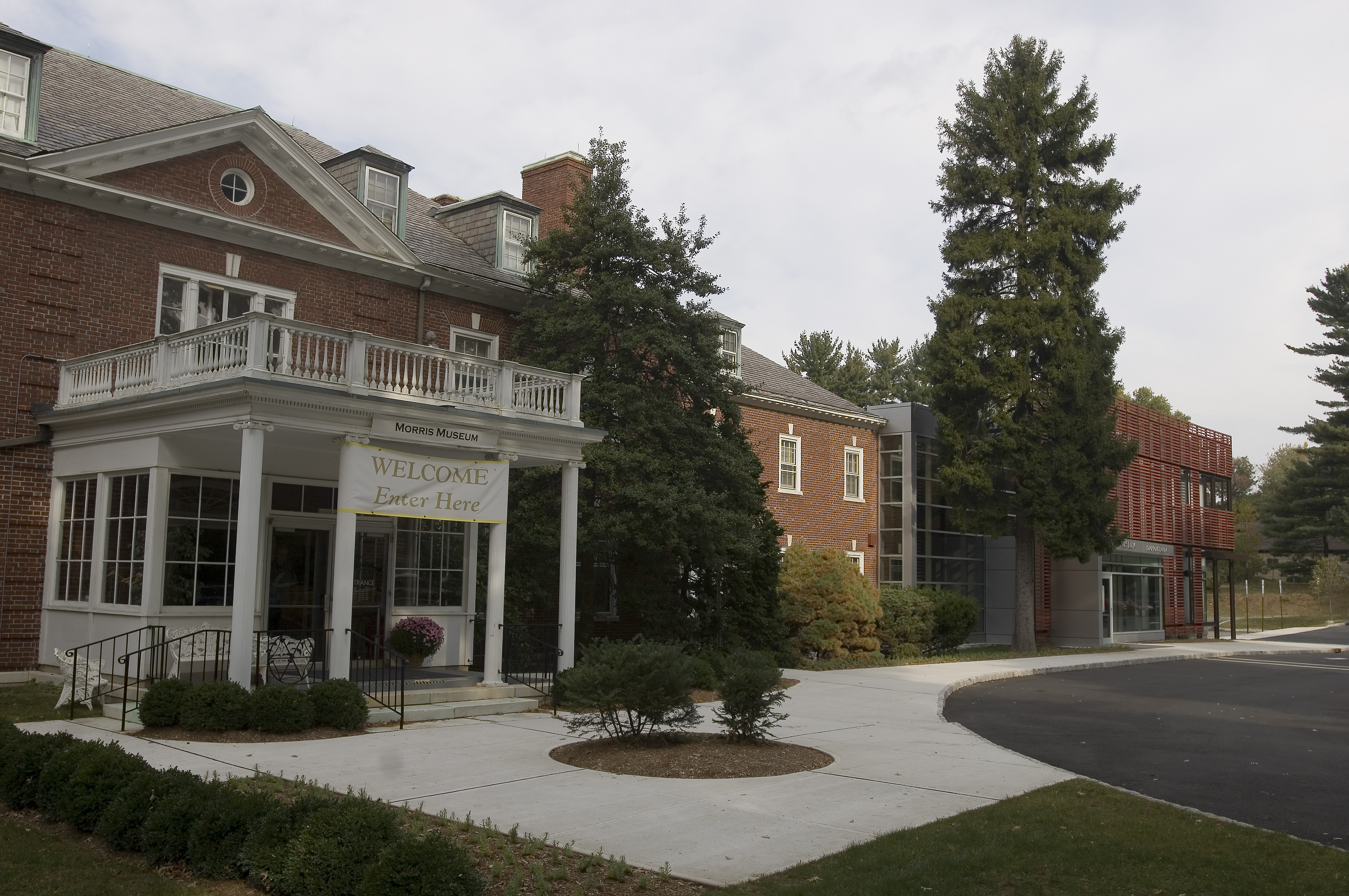
Morris Museum

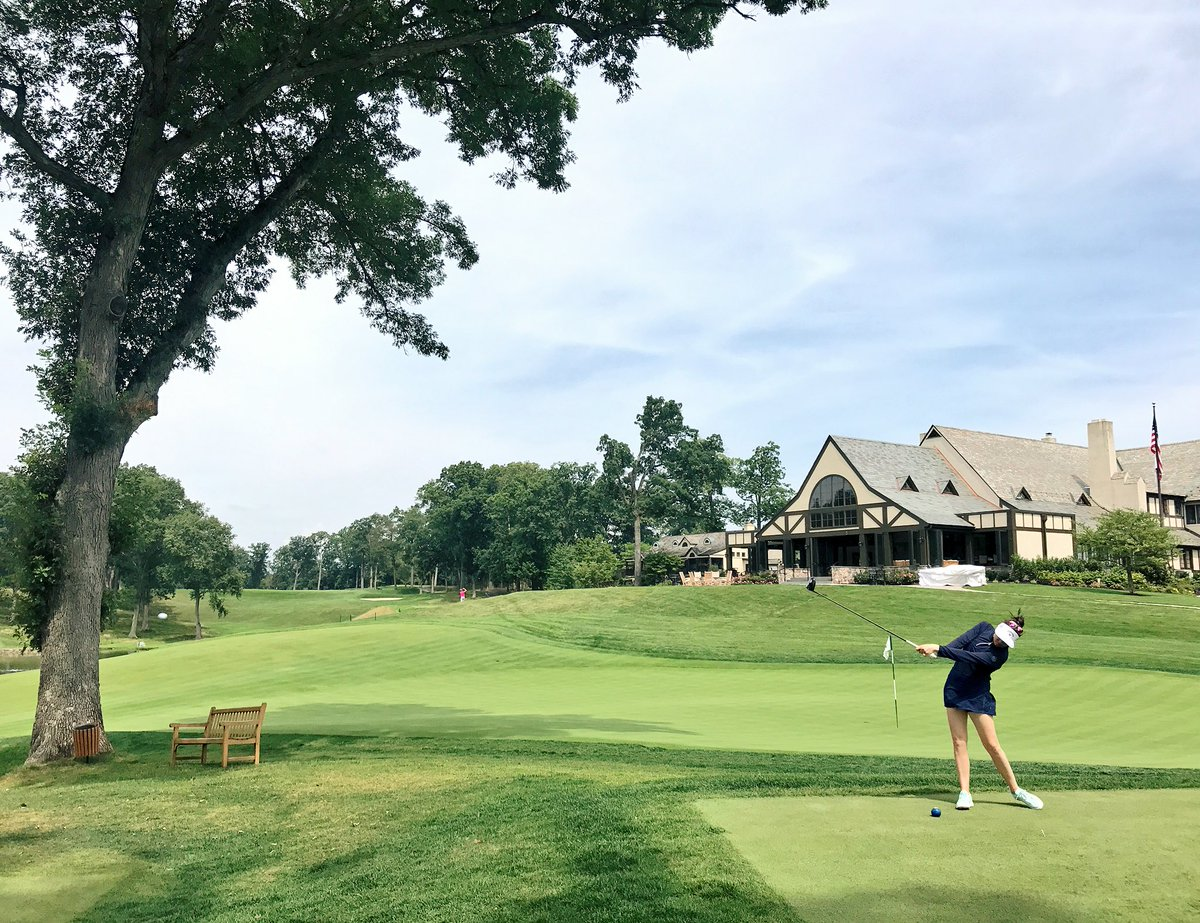
Morris County Golf Club

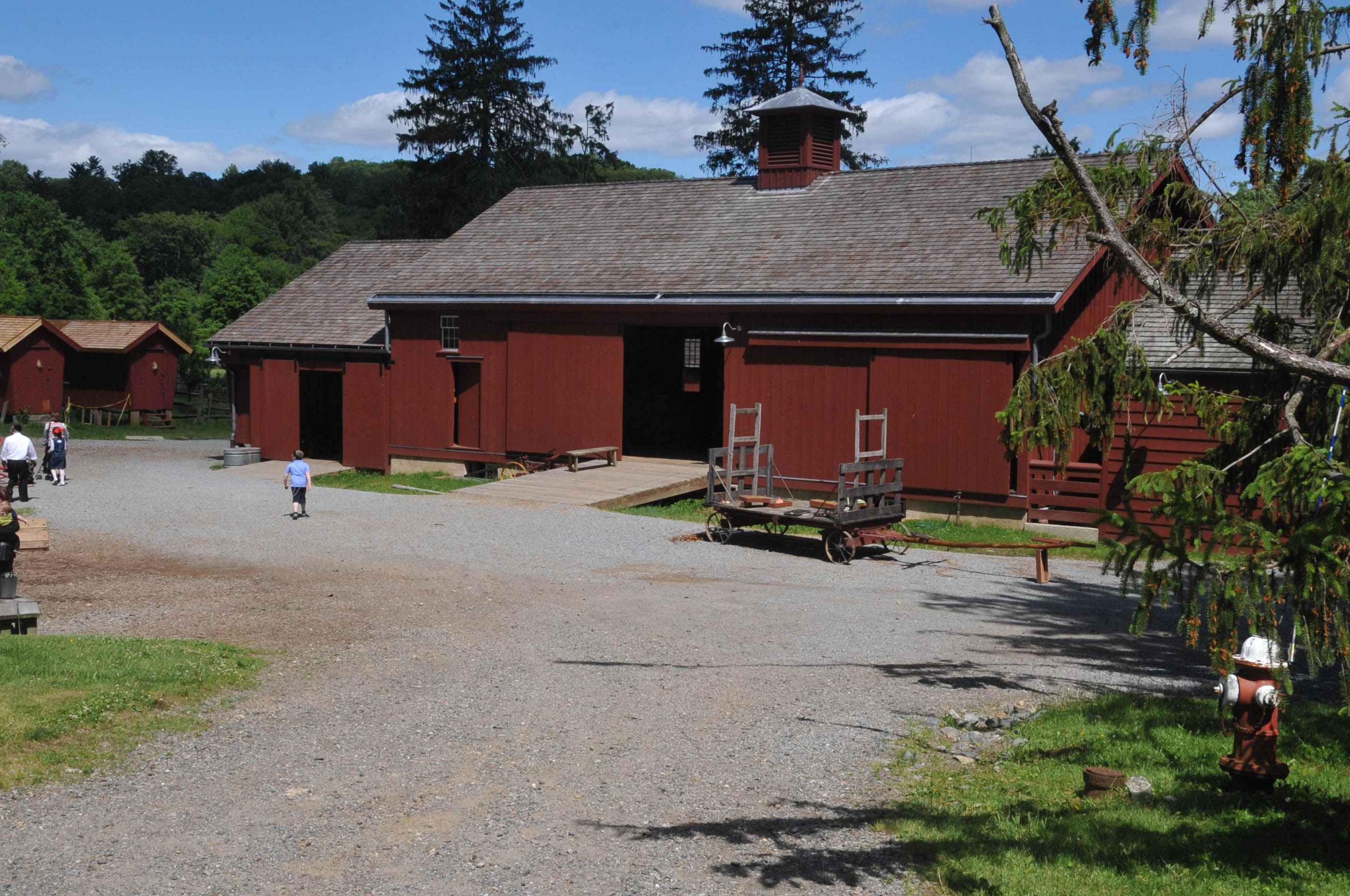
Fosterfields Living Historical Farm

=== Morris Museum ===
Actively running since 1913, the Morris Museum is the second largest museum in New Jersey at 75,524 square feet (7,016.4 m2). The museum is fully accredited by the American Alliance of Museums.

=== Morris County Golf Club ===
Founded in 1894, the Morris County Golf Club was unique at the time in that it was established and operated by women including Nina Howland. The club hosted the United States Women's Amateur Golf Championship in 1896, which was won by Beatrix Hoyt, making it the first national title to be contested in the state.

Although the club was established in 1894 the current course was designed in 1916 by architect Seth Raynor. The current clubhouse was built in 1919.

Some notable figures in the sport have been associated with the Club, including Harry Vardon, Ted Ray, Bobby Jones, Chick Evans and Walter Kozak.

=== Fosterfields ===
Since 1972, Fosterfields Living Historical Farm has been a state protected living history park and museum covering more than 200 acres (81 ha) in Morris Township. A 1915 farmhouse and 1854 Revere mansion owned by the families of Caroline Rose Foster are preserved. Activities such as educational programs, historical reenactments, storytellers, and public concerts are open to the general public throughout the year.

== Economy ==
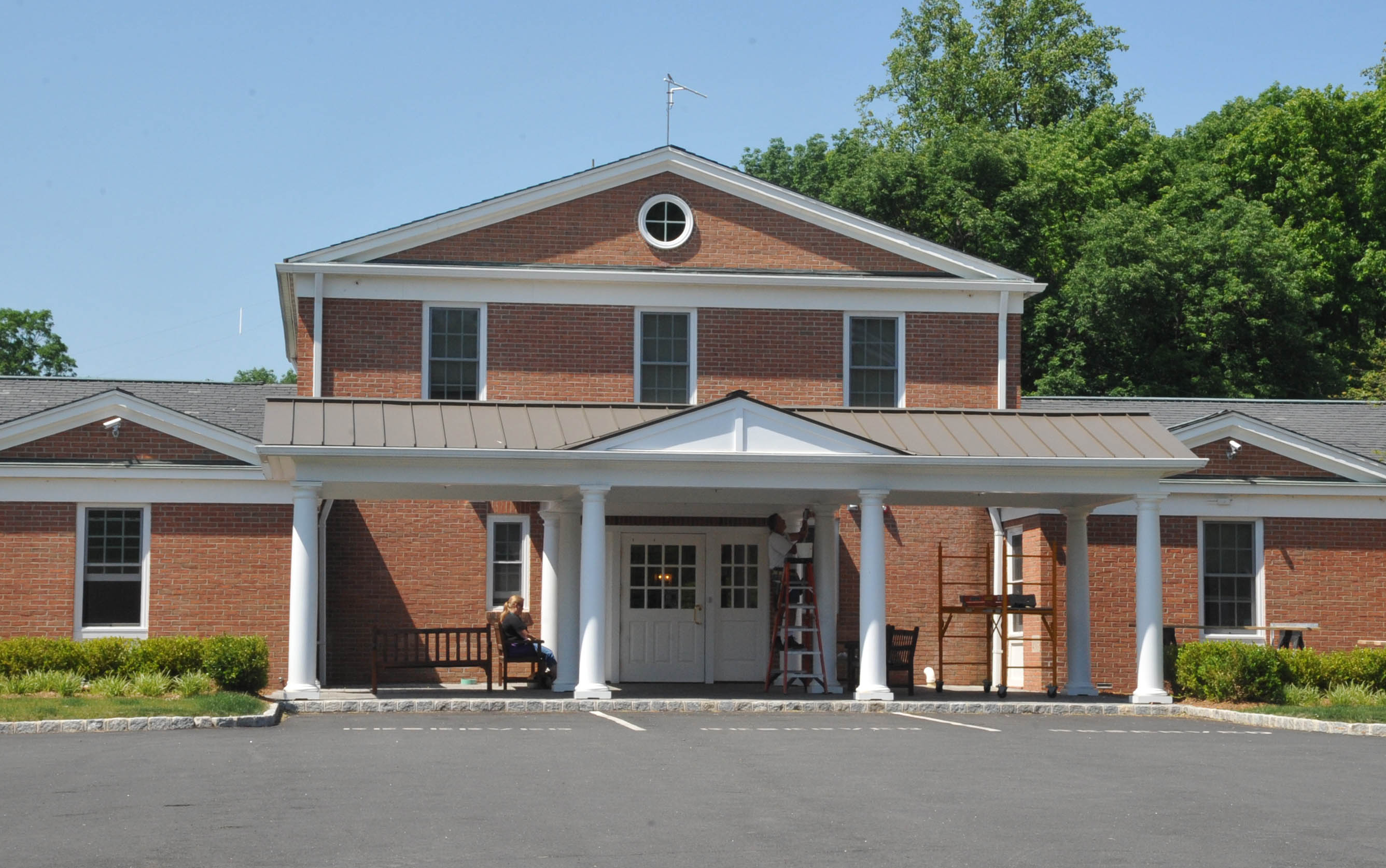
The Seeing Eye

Honeywell used to have its headquarters in Morris Township.

Companies with offices and facilities in Morris Township include the Louis Berger Group and The Seeing Eye, a guide dog school.

== Government ==
=== Local government ===
Morris Township is governed under the Township form of New Jersey municipal government, one of 141 municipalities (of the 564) statewide that use this form, the second-most commonly used form of government in the state. The Township Committee is comprised of five members, who are elected directly by the voters at-large in partisan elections to serve three-year terms of office on a staggered basis, with either one or two seats coming up for election each year as part of the November general election in a three-year cycle. The Mayor and Deputy Mayor are selected by the Township Committee from among its members at a reorganization meeting held in the first week of January each year.

As of 2026, members of the Morris Township Committee are Mayor Donna J. Guariglia (D, term on committee ends December 31, 2027; term as mayor ends December 31, 2026), Deputy Mayor Siva S. Jonnada (D, term on committee and as deputy mayor both end December 31, 2026), Jeff Grayzel (D, 2028), William "Bud" Ravitz (I, 2026) (Note: Elected as a Democrat, switched parties after being denied local party support for reelection in March 2026), and Samatha G. Rothman (D, 2026).

On February 6, 2026, Committeeman Mark Gyorfy resigned from the Township Committee after taking a position with the administration of Governor Mikie Sherrill. On March 9, 2026, Samantha G. Rothman was chosen by the Township Committee to fill the vacancy until a special election is held in November 2026. She took office on March 18, 2026.

=== Federal, state, and county representation ===
Morris Township is located in the 11th Congressional District and is part of New Jersey's 25th state legislative district.

For the 119th United States Congress, New Jersey's 11th congressional district is represented by Analilia Mejia (D, Glen Ridge) who was elected in a 2026 special election to serve for the remainder of the Congress following the resignation Mikie Sherrill (D, Montclair), who was elected Governor of New Jersey in 2025. New Jersey is represented in the United States Senate by Democrats Cory Booker (Newark, term ends 2027) and Andy Kim (Moorestown, term ends 2031).

For the 2026–2027 session, the 25th legislative district of the New Jersey Legislature is represented in the State Senate by Anthony M. Bucco (R, Boonton Township) and in the General Assembly by Aura K. Dunn (R, Mendham Borough) and Marisa Sweeney (D, Morristown).

Morris County is governed by a Board of County Commissioners comprised of seven members who are elected at-large in partisan elections to three-year terms on a staggered basis, with either one or three seats up for election each year as part of the November general election. Actual day-to-day operation of departments is supervised by County Administrator Deena Leary.

As of 2026, Morris County's Commissioners (with all terms ending December 31) are Director Stephen H. Shaw (R, Mountain Lakes, 2027), Deputy Director John Krickus (R, Washington Township, 2027), Douglas Cabana (R, Boonton Township, 2028), Thomas J. Mastrangelo (R, Montville, 2028), Christine Myers (R, Harding Township, 2028), Tayfun Selen (R, Chatham Township, 2026), and Deborah Smith (R, Denville Township, 2027).

The county's constitutional officers are County Clerk Ann F. Grossi (R, Parsippany–Troy Hills, 2028), Sheriff James M. Gannon (R, Boonton Township, 2025) and Surrogate Heather Darling (R, Roxbury, 2029).

=== Politics ===
United States presidential election results for Morris Township 2024 2020 2016 2012 2008 2004
Year	Republican		Democratic		Third party(ies)	
Year	No.	%	No.	%	No.	%
2024	5,558	38.91%	8,484	59.40%	242	1.69%
2020	5,538	36.92%	9,235	61.56%	228	1.52%
2016	5,147	40.83%	6,983	55.40%	475	3.77%
2012	6,133	51.43%	5,679	47.62%	113	0.95%
2008	6,129	48.19%	6,509	51.18%	81	0.64%
2004	6,488	52.07%	5,884	47.22%	88	0.71%

As of October 2017, there were a total of 17,566 registered voters in Morris Township, of which 5,458 (31.1%) were registered as Democrats, 5,694 (32.4%) were registered as Republicans and 6,353 (36.2%) were registered as Unaffiliated. There were 61 voters registered as Libertarians or Greens.

Gubernatorial election results for Morris Township
Year	Republican		Democratic		Third party(ies)	
Year	No.	%	No.	%	No.	%
2025	4,862	39.26%	7,474	60.35%	48	0.39%
2021	4,453	45.12%	5,356	54.27%	60	0.61%
2017	3,665	45.69%	4,255	53.04%	102	1.27%
2013	5,033	66.68%	2,380	31.53%	135	1.79%
2009	5,059	55.42%	3,309	36.25%	760	8.33%
2005	4,324	52.85%	3,687	45.06%	171	2.09%

In the 2012 presidential election, Republican Mitt Romney received 51.4% of the vote (6,133 cast), ahead of Democrat Barack Obama with 47.6% (5,679 votes), and other candidates with 0.9% (113 votes), among the 11,990 ballots cast by the township's 16,497 registered voters (65 ballots were spoiled), for a turnout of 72.7%. In the 2008 presidential election, Democrat Barack Obama received 50.9% of the vote (6,509 cast), ahead of Republican John McCain with 47.9% (6,129 votes) and other candidates with 0.6% (81 votes), among the 12,797 ballots cast by the township's 16,201 registered voters, for a turnout of 79.0%. In the 2004 presidential election, Republican George W. Bush received 51.9% of the vote (6,488 ballots cast), outpolling Democrat John Kerry with 47.1% (5,884 votes) and other candidates with 0.5% (88 votes), among the 12,503 ballots cast by the township's 16,466 registered voters, for a turnout percentage of 75.9.

In the 2013 gubernatorial election, Republican Chris Christie received 66.7% of the vote (5,033 cast), ahead of Democrat Barbara Buono with 31.5% (2,380 votes), and other candidates with 1.8% (135 votes), among the 7,674 ballots cast by the township's 16,239 registered voters (126 ballots were spoiled), for a turnout of 47.3%. In the 2009 gubernatorial election, Republican Chris Christie received 55.1% of the vote (5,059 ballots cast), ahead of Democrat Jon Corzine with 36.0% (3,309 votes), Independent Chris Daggett with 7.9% (730 votes) and other candidates with 0.3% (30 votes), among the 9,185 ballots cast by the township's 15,846 registered voters, yielding a 58.0% turnout.

United States Senate election results for Morris Township1
Year	Republican		Democratic		Third party(ies)	
Year	No.	%	No.	%	No.	%
2024	5,663	40.91%	7,967	57.56%	211	1.52%
2018	5,276	46.24%	5,818	50.99%	316	2.77%
2012	5,805	51.39%	5,374	47.57%	118	1.04%
2006	4,581	52.75%	3,985	45.89%	118	1.36%

United States Senate election results for Morris Township2
Year	Republican		Democratic		Third party(ies)	
Year	No.	%	No.	%	No.	%
2020	6,082	40.73%	8,743	58.56%	106	0.71%
2014	3,487	50.04%	3,399	48.77%	83	1.19%
2013	2,945	51.17%	2,769	48.11%	41	0.71%
2008	6,255	52.87%	5,457	46.12%	120	1.01%

== Education ==
Students in pre-kindergarten through twelfth grade attend the schools of the Morris School District, which also serves public school students from Morristown (K–12), along with those from Morris Plains who attend for grades 9–12 as part of a sending/receiving relationship. Schools in the district (with 2023–24 enrollment data from the National Center for Education Statistics) are Lafayette Learning Center (with 108 students in grade PreK), Alexander Hamilton School (248; 3–5), Hillcrest School (268; K–2), Thomas Jefferson School (305; 3–5), Normandy Park School (361; K–5), Sussex Avenue School (336; 3–5), Alfred Vail School (334; K–2), Woodland School (293; K–2), Frelinghuysen Middle School (1,026; 6–8) and Morristown High School (1,856; 9–12). The nine elected seats on the district's board of education are allocated based on the population of the constituent municipalities, with five seats assigned to Morris Township.

The Academy of St. Elizabeth is a Catholic school for girls that admitted its first students in 1860, located in the Convent Station area, and operated independently of the Roman Catholic Diocese of Paterson. The school has an enrollment of 230 students and is the oldest school for girls in New Jersey.

The Saint Elizabeth University is a private Roman Catholic, four-year, liberal arts college for women, located in Convent Station. The college was founded in 1899 by the Sisters of Charity of Saint Elizabeth of New Jersey.

The Rabbinical College of America, one of the largest Chabad Lubavitch Chasidic yeshivas in the world is located in Morristown. The Rabbinical College of America has a baal teshuva yeshiva for students of diverse Jewish backgrounds, named Yeshiva Tiferes Bachurim. The New Jersey Regional Headquarters for the worldwide Chabad Lubavitch movement is located on the campus.

== Transportation ==
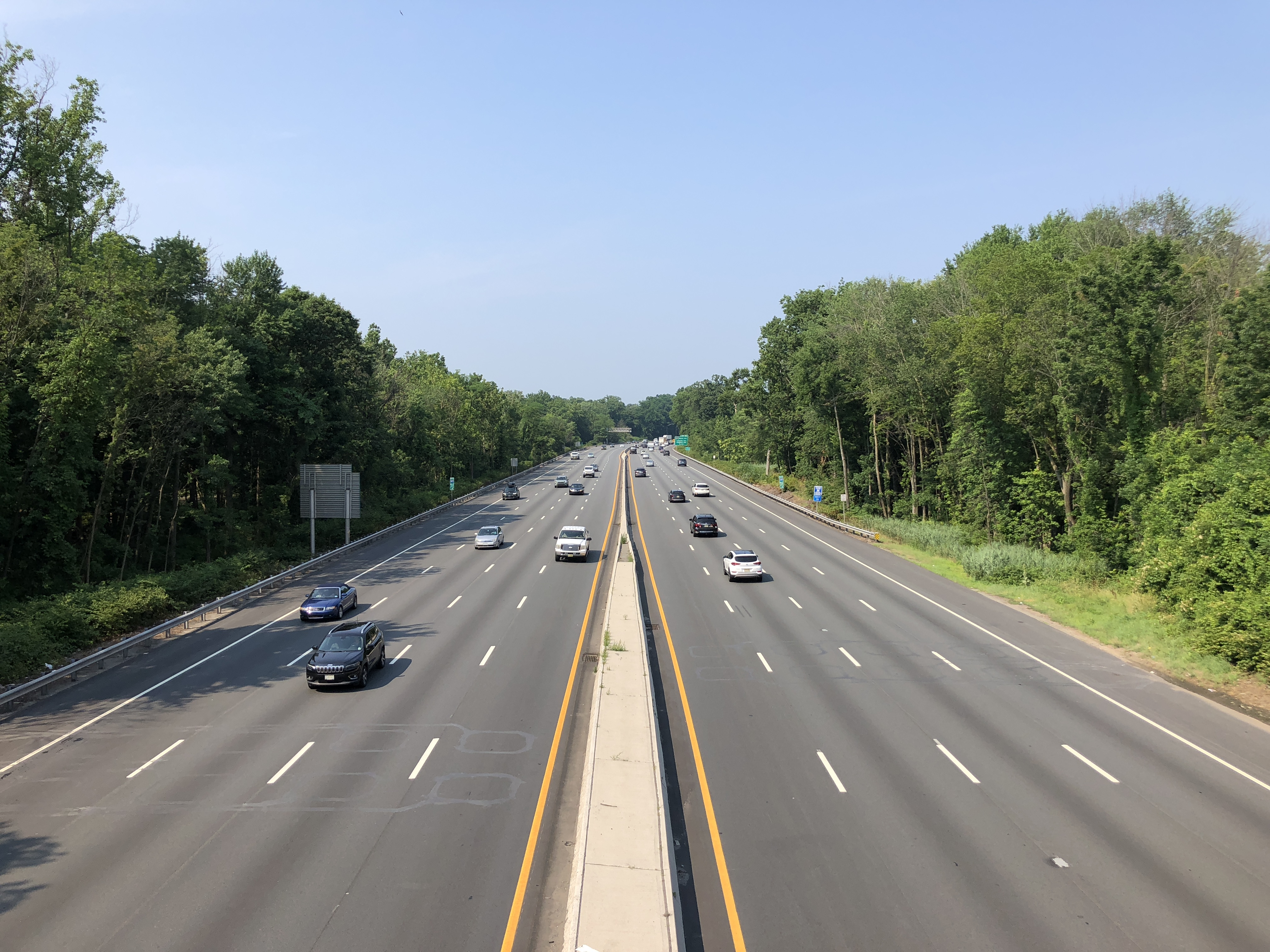
Interstate 287 southbound in Morris Township

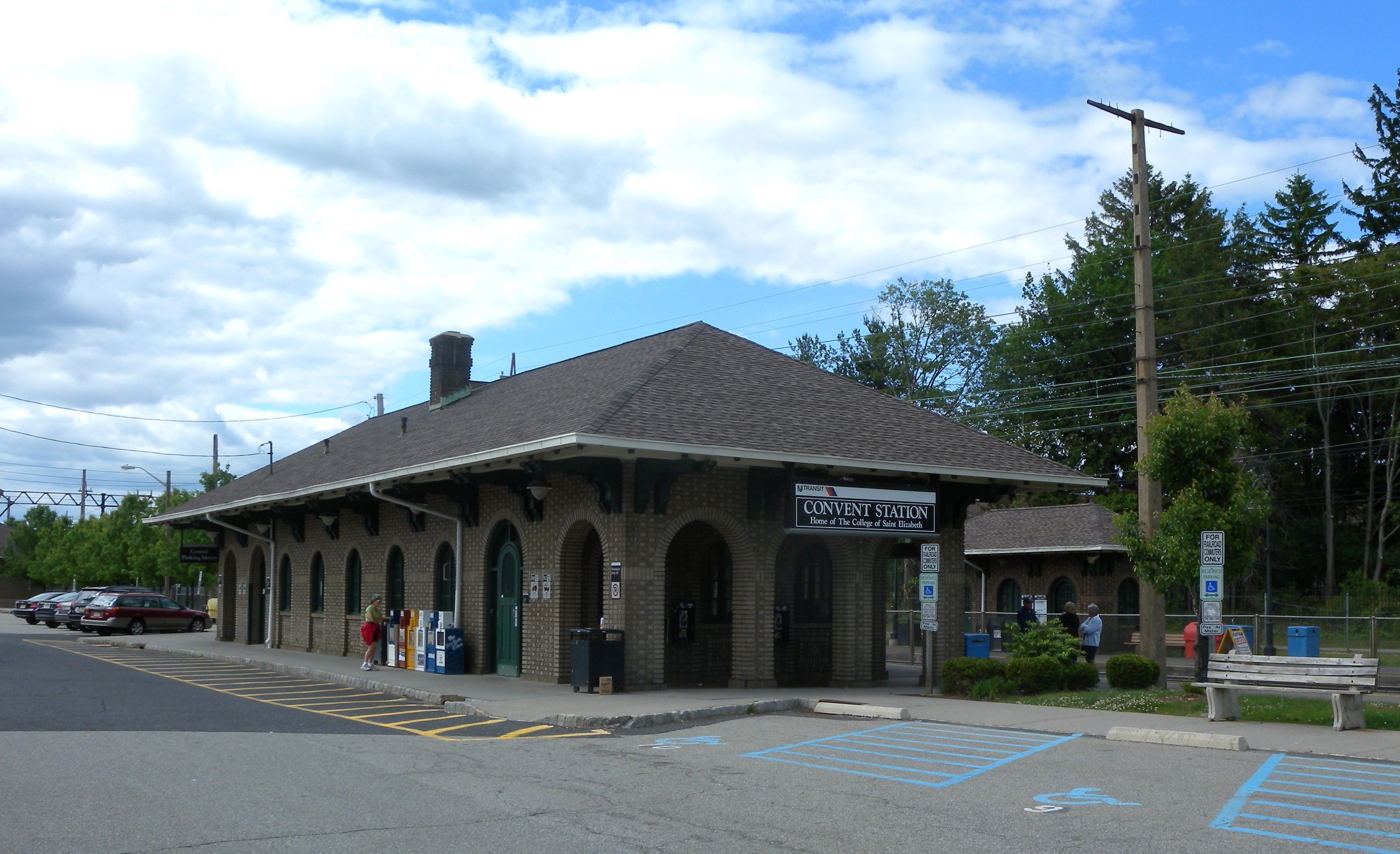
Convent Station

=== Roads and highways ===
As of May 2010, the township had a total of 126.51 miles (203.60 km) of roadways, of which 106.11 miles (170.77 km) were maintained by the municipality, 13.96 miles (22.47 km) by Morris County and 6.44 miles (10.36 km) by the New Jersey Department of Transportation.

A few major roads pass through the community including Route 124, Route 24, CR 510, U.S. Route 202, and Interstate 287.

=== Public transportation ===
Convent Station is a NJ Transit rail station located on the grounds of the College of Saint Elizabeth. Service is available on the Morristown Line to Newark Broad Street Station, Secaucus Junction, Penn Station New York and Hoboken Terminal.

NJ Transit offers local bus service on the 871, 872, 873, 875, 878 and 880 routes, replacing service that had been offered on the MCM1, MCM2, MCM3, MCM4, MCM8 and MCM10 routes until 2010, when subsidies to the local provider were eliminated as part of budget cuts.

The Morris County Traction Company began trolley service in downtown Dover in July 1904, and expanded over the years until the system was completed in 1914 all the way to Newark, via Morristown and Summit, including service in Morris Township. The trolleys were replaced with buses in 1928.

== Notable people ==
People who were born in, residents of, or otherwise closely associated with Morris Township include:

- Ben Bailey (born 1970), comedian and host of Cash Cab
- Warren Bobrow (born c. 1961), mixologist, chef, and writer known as the "Cocktail Whisperer"
- Michael Patrick Carroll (born 1958), represented the 25th Legislative District in the New Jersey General Assembly from 1996 to 2020.
- Robert Del Tufo (1933–2016), Attorney General of New Jersey from 1990 to 1993
- Caroline Rose Foster (1877–1979), farmer and founder of Fosterfields Living Historical Farm
- Connor Lade (born 1989), professional soccer player
- Kent Manahan, television broadcast journalist and primetime news anchor
- Charley Molnar (born 1961), football coach
- Dan Quinn (born 1970), football coach
- Joseph Warren Revere (1812–1880), court-martialed Union brigadier general during the American Civil War, and grandson of Paul Revere
- Stephen B. Wiley (1929–2015), politician who served in the New Jersey Senate from 1974 to 1978, where he represented the 23rd Legislative District
