= Convent Station, New Jersey =

Populated place in Morris County, New Jersey, US

- Unincorporated community
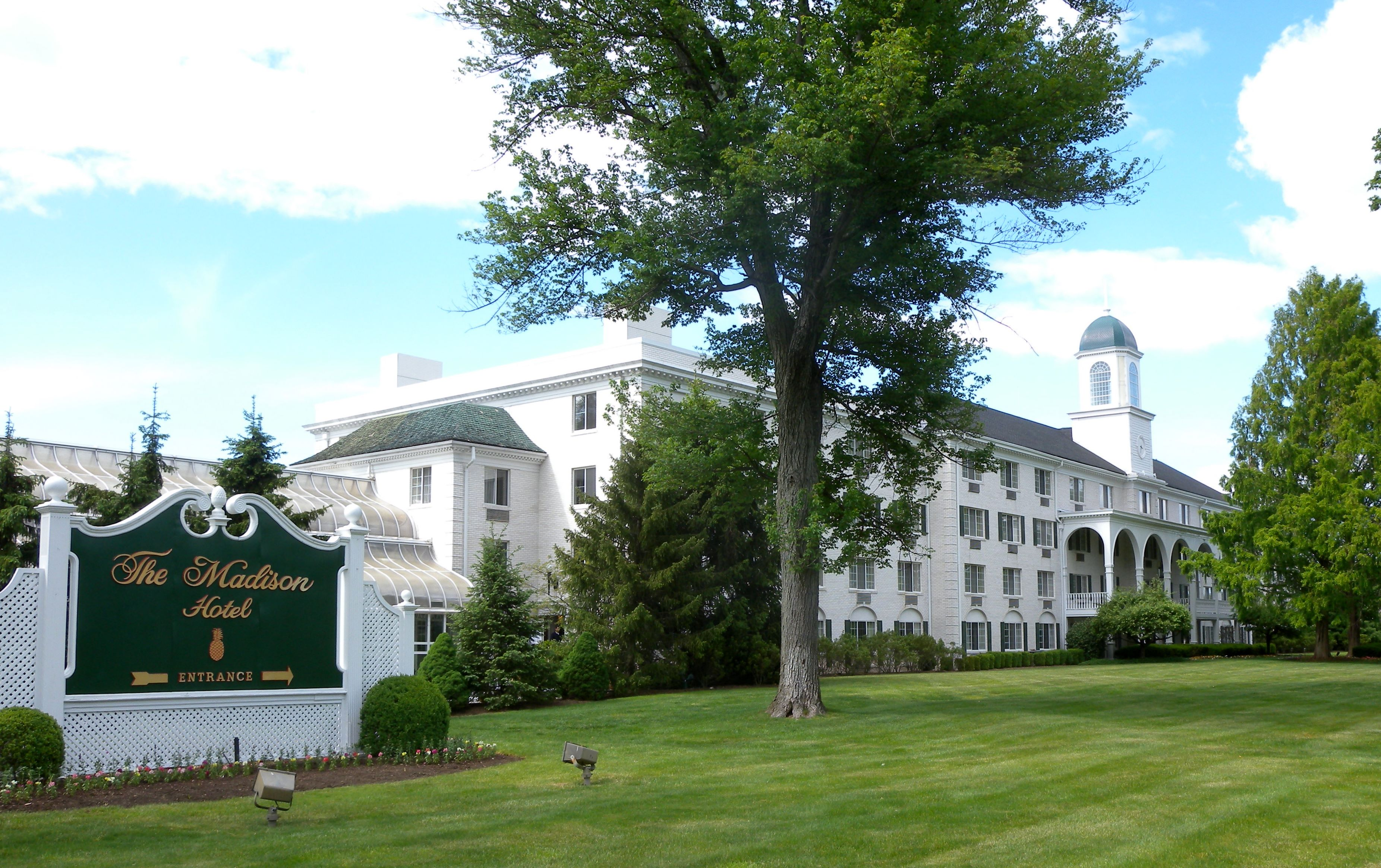
- Madison Hotel in Convent Station

- Location within Morris County, New Jersey Location within New Jersey Location within the United States
- Coordinates: 40.780°N 74.446°W
- Country: United States
- State: New Jersey
- County: Morris
- Township: Morris
- Elevation: 371 ft (113 m)
- ZIP Code: 07961
- GNIS feature ID: 883543

Convent Station is an unincorporated community located within Morris Township, in Morris County, in the U.S. state of New Jersey. The community is named after the Convent Station railroad station that was constructed along the Morris and Essex Lines during the 1870s.

Among the neighborhoods of Convent Station are Bradwahl, Cromwell Hills, and the Normandy Park Historic District; which was added in 1996 to both the National and New Jersey registers of historic places. The Morris Township Municipal Building and Police Headquarters are located in Convent Station.

The community is home to the Morris County Golf Club, the Morris Museum, and Saint Elizabeth University, a private Catholic, coeducational, four-year, liberal arts university founded in 1899.

== History ==
The community is named after the railroad station that was constructed there during the 1870s to serve the 200-acre (0.81 km^{2}) complex of the Academy of Saint Elizabeth, a Catholic school currently operating under the auspices of the Roman Catholic Diocese of Paterson. The academy, the first secondary school for young women in the state, was founded in 1860 by the Sisters of Charity of Saint Elizabeth of New Jersey. The academy is a private college preparatory school for young women with an enrollment of two hundred and thirty students.

In 1865, Morristown incorporated with a boundary that excluded the convent's large land holdings. That boundary line separated the two in 1895 when Morristown was formally set off from the township.

The Saint Elizabeth University, which was founded on the campus in 1899, is the oldest college for women in New Jersey and one of the first Catholic colleges in the United States to award degrees to women. The Saint Elizabeth campus also includes the Villa of Saint Ann. At one time there also was a kindergarten and elementary school on the campus and, for many years, the complex was sustained by dairy products and produce from its own large farm.

== Industry ==
Honeywell's global headquarters was previously located here, before controversially relocating to nearby Morris Plains for a $40 million incentive package in 2015. Despite the relocation of their headquarters, Honeywell continues to inhabit office/lab space in Convent Station. The roughly 147-acre (59 ha) site was redeveloped into 235 luxury townhomes, additional lab/office space (approximately 900,000 square feet (84,000 m^{2})), a community center, and open, free-use space (including 4 ponds and 1.68 miles (2.70 km) of walking trails).

== Points of interest ==
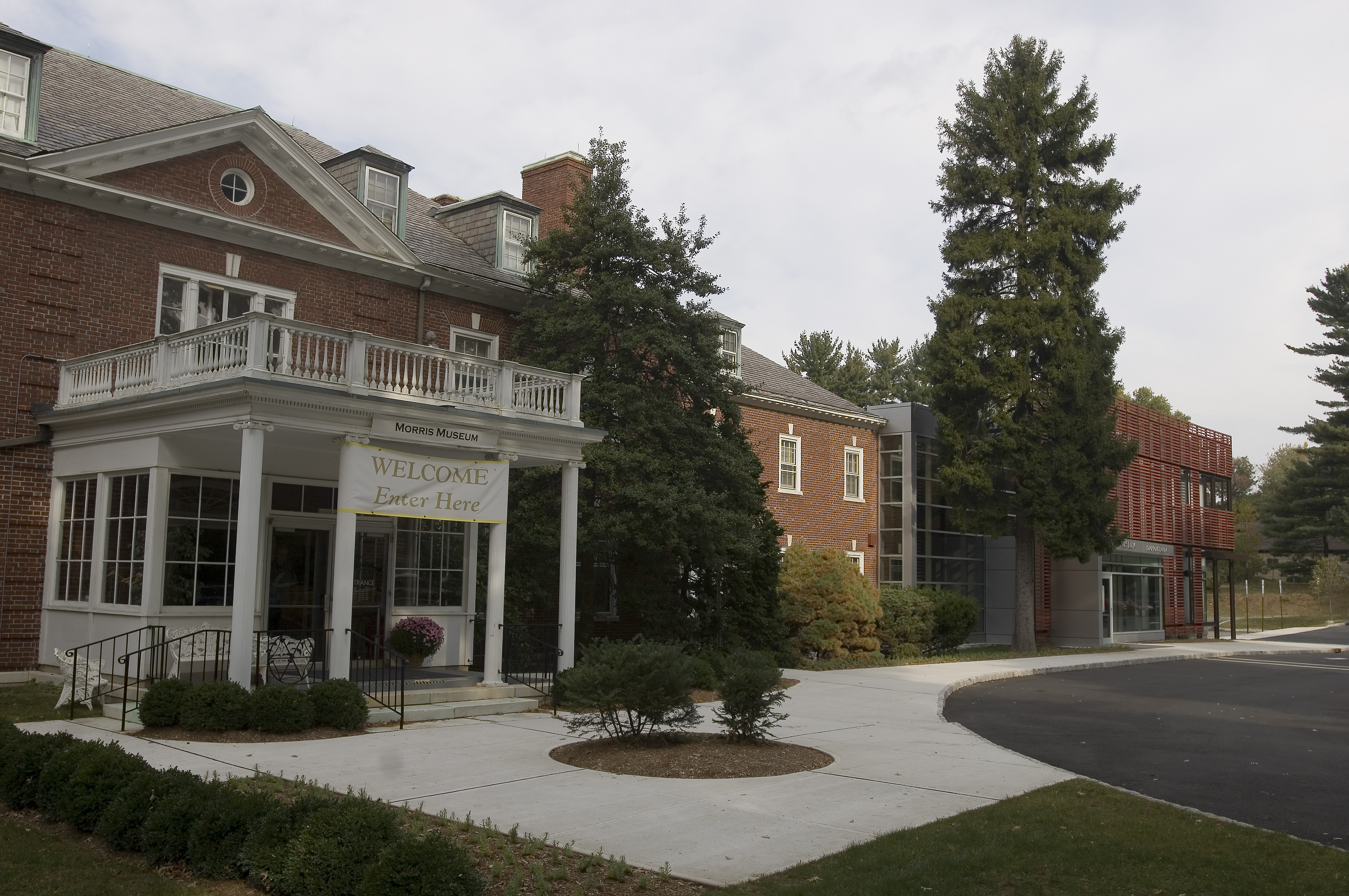
Morris Museum

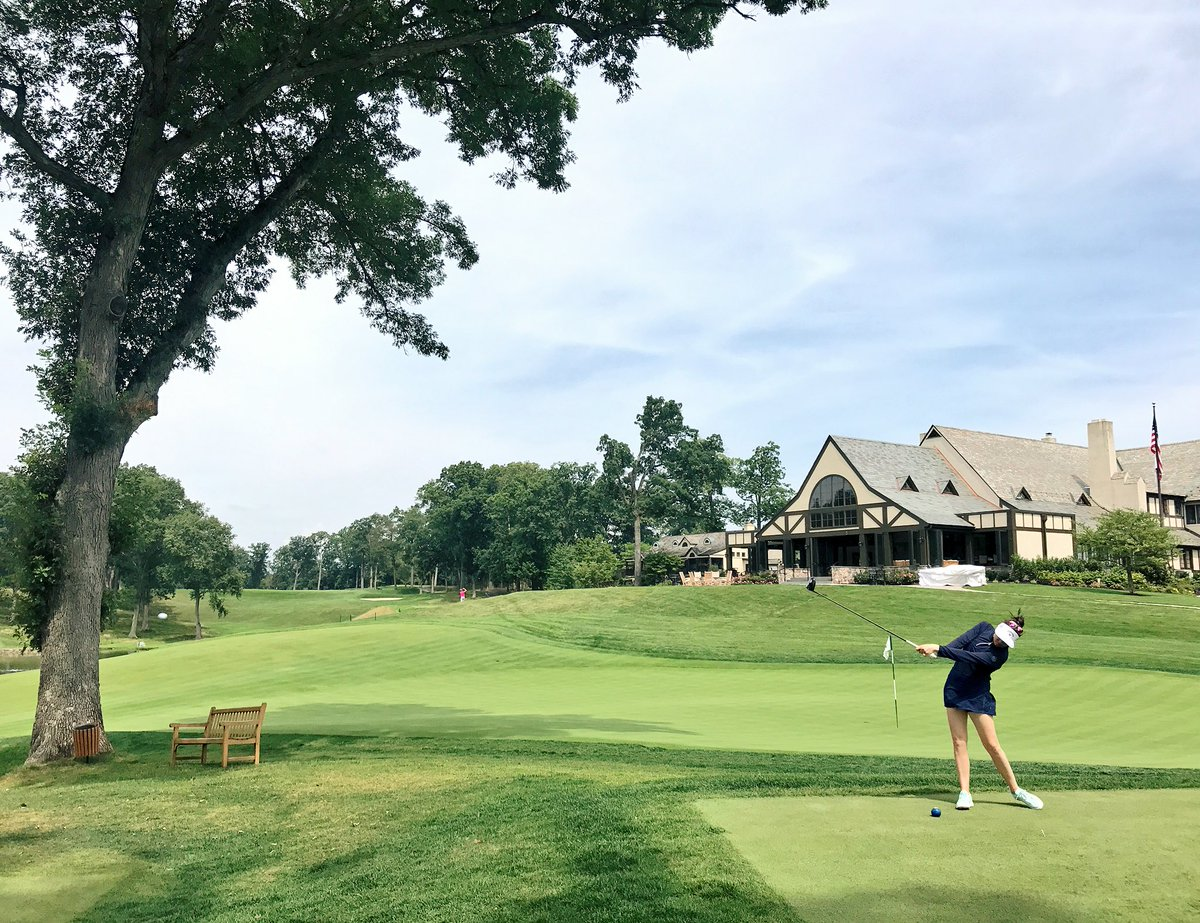
Morris County Golf Club

=== Morris Museum ===
Actively running since 1913, the Morris Museum is the second largest museum in New Jersey at 75,524 square feet (7,016.4 m^{2}). The museum is fully accredited by the American Alliance of Museums.

=== Morris County Golf Club ===
Founded in 1894, the Morris County Golf Club (MCGC) is a private, members-only golf club located on 175 acres (71 ha). The club was the first in the nation to be both managed and organized solely by women.

In 1895, MCGC was among the first group of members the United States Golf Association. In 1900, the club was one of the 10 founding member clubs of the New Jersey State Golf Association

== Education ==
As part of Morris Township, residents of Convent Station are served by the Morris School District.

The Academy of St. Elizabeth is a Catholic school for girls that admitted its first students in 1860. It operates independently of the Roman Catholic Diocese of Paterson. The school has an enrollment of 230 students and is the oldest school for girls in New Jersey.

The Saint Elizabeth University is a private Roman Catholic, a private Catholic, coeducational, four-year, liberal arts university. The college was founded in 1899 by the Sisters of Charity of Saint Elizabeth of New Jersey. The college began transitioning into a co-educational institution, starting with the 2016 freshman intake. The final all-female class graduated in 2019. The institution was accorded university status by the New Jersey Department of Education as of July 1, 2020.

== Transportation ==
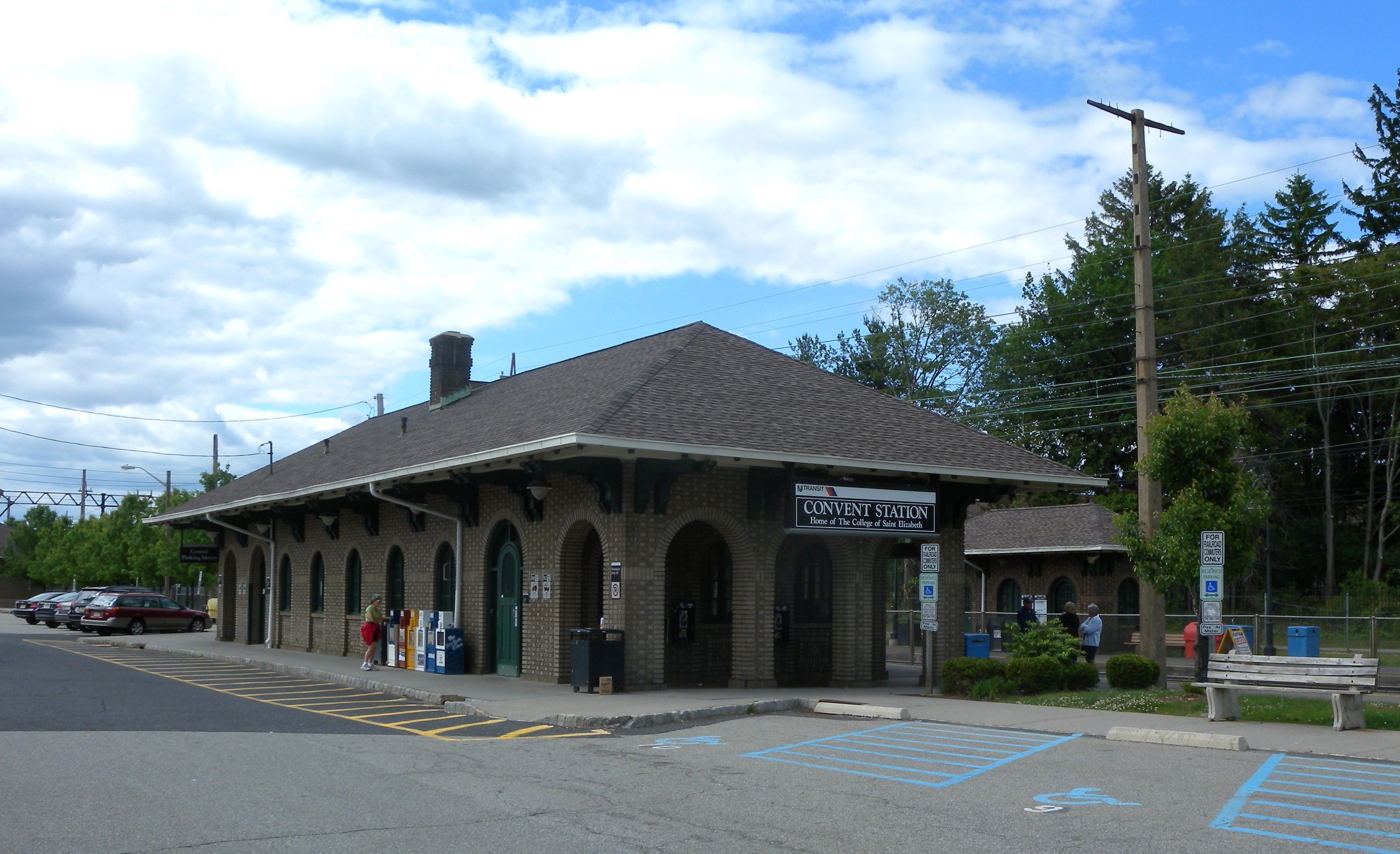
Convent Station

=== Roads and highways ===
A few major roads pass through the community including Route 124, Route 24, and CR 510.

=== Public transportation ===
Convent Station is a NJ Transit rail station located on the grounds of Saint Elizabeth University's campus. It provides rail transportation both east and west of Convent Station. The trains provide Midtown Direct service on the Morris & Essex Lines. Service is available on the Morristown Line to Newark Broad Street Station, Secaucus Junction, and Penn Station New York. Service to Hoboken Terminal is also provided.

== Notable people ==
People who were born in, residents of, or otherwise closely associated with Convent Station include:

- A. B. Frost (1851-1928), illustrator and painter
- Connor Lade (born 1989), professional soccer player.
