= Morris County Golf Club =

Golf club in Morris Township, New Jersey

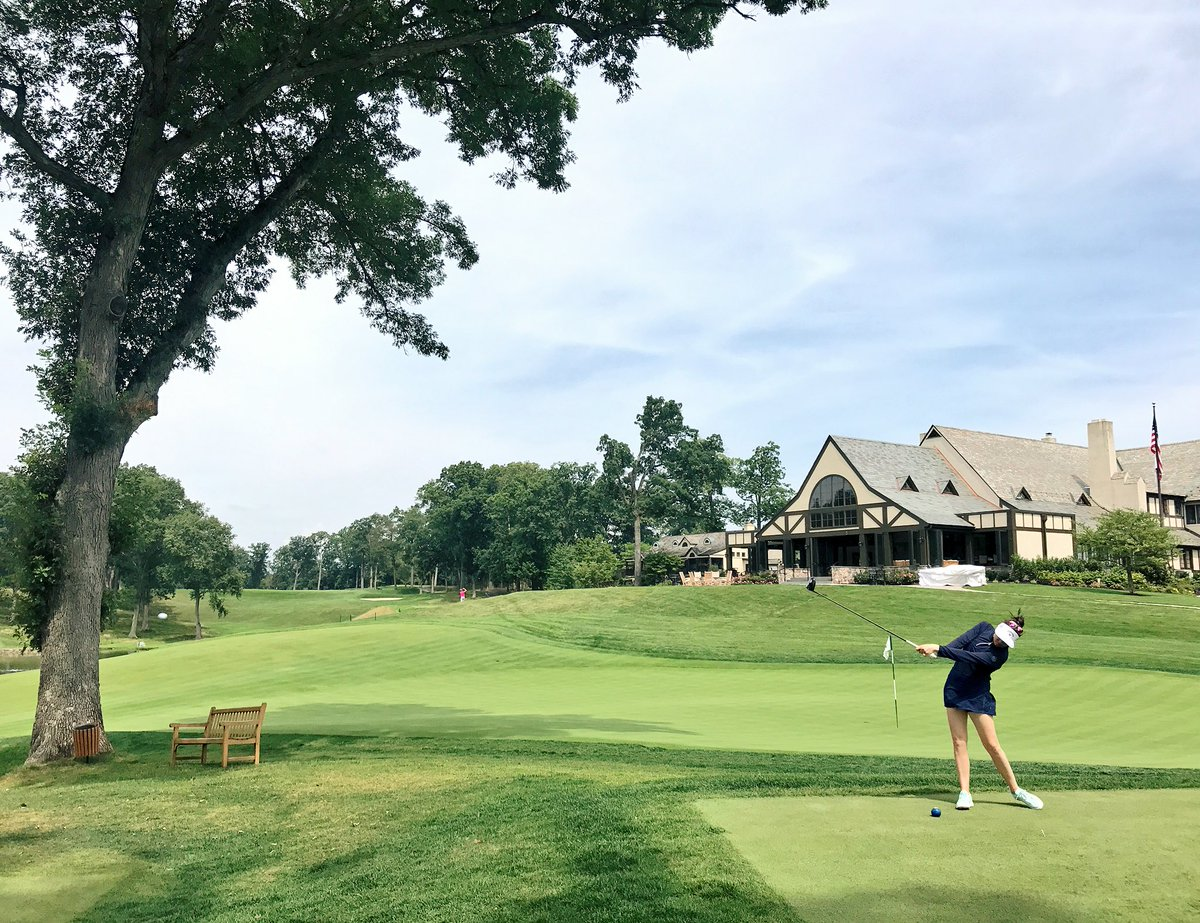
- Morris County Golf Club Clubhouse

- Location within New Jersey
- 40°47′8.43″N 74°26′34.4″W

Club information
- Location: Morris Township, New Jersey, U.S.
- Established: 1894
- Type: Private
- Total holes: 18
- Website: www.morriscgc.com
- Designed by: Charles Blair Macdonald and Seth Raynor
- Par: 70
- Length: 6,522 yards (5,964 m)
- Course rating: 71.6
- Slope rating: 129

The Morris County Golf Club (MCGC) is a private, members-only golf club located on 175 acres (71 ha) in the upscale Convent Station section of Morris Township, New Jersey, a suburb northwest of New York City in Morris County. It is one of the 10 founding member clubs of the New Jersey State Golf Association.

Founded in 1894, it was unique at the time in that it was established and operated by women only. The following year, MCGC became an early member of the United States Golf Association and was the first New Jersey venue to host a national championship. Two of the club's presidents have also served as United States Golf Association presidents.

== History ==
On April 10, 1894, a group of women met in Morristown to plan their new enterprise of a golf course. The group which formed was headed by Miss Nina Howland, as president with others officers including Mrs. H. McK. Twombly and Mrs. William Shippen, Miss Fields and Mrs. Charles Bradley. The group rented 20 acres of land and their first course was laid out with only 7 holes.

As of November 1894 the club was the only one in the nation both managed and organized solely by women. The membership of the club was divided into four classes - regular, limited, associate and honorary. Within the first year, the club had 200 female and 175 male members.

On June 21, 1895, in a letter to the club's president Nina Howland, the United States Golf Association (USGA) informed Morris County Golf Club that their membership had been granted. This was the first women-only club to become a USGA member.

In 1896, changes came as the club was incorporated with a $50,000 capital stock and almost 100 acres were purchased with plans of course expansion. In 1897, the course's management was taken over by men.

Although golf has always been the club's premier sport, over the years it has been complemented by various other activities. Most notably tennis, swimming, paddle tennis, and ice hockey among others.

In 1919, the club's Clubhouse was built. The clubhouse is available to members in addition to sponsored guests for all special events.

In 1995, the Preschool Advantage, Inc., began hosting their annual golf invitational at Morris County Golf Club and this year is their 25th year.

== Course Information ==
In 1916, the current course was designed by prominent architects Seth Raynor and Charles Blair Macdonald. The original course was restored in 2001.

The golf course is described as 18-hole, par 70 course on 150 acres. The course has 6,522 yards of golf from the championship tees with a rating of 71.6 and a slope of 129. Greens tees and fairways consist of bentgrass maintained at a championship level. The course also features a practice putting green, a driving range (renovated in 2011) and a short game area.

== Description ==
Club facilities include har tru and hard surface tennis courts and platform tennis courts, as well as a Paddle Facility (renovated in 2016) complete with indoor entertaining space and a fire pit on the deck; an Olympic size swimming pool, Poolside Bar and Grill, and fully stocked Golf and Racquet Pro Shops.

The Clubhouse features four dining spaces, the Raynor Room, the Sun Room, the Pub Room and the Patio (renovated in 2017). Executive Chef Adam Plitt has created seasonal menus suitable for fine dining and casual dining year round.

The club hosts special events for members and their invited guests throughout the year including an Independence Day barbecue with fireworks, a Memorial Day picnic, a Labor Day picnic, an Easter brunch with an Easter egg hunt for children, Father-daughter dances, and more.
