= Connor Lade =

American soccer player (b.1989)

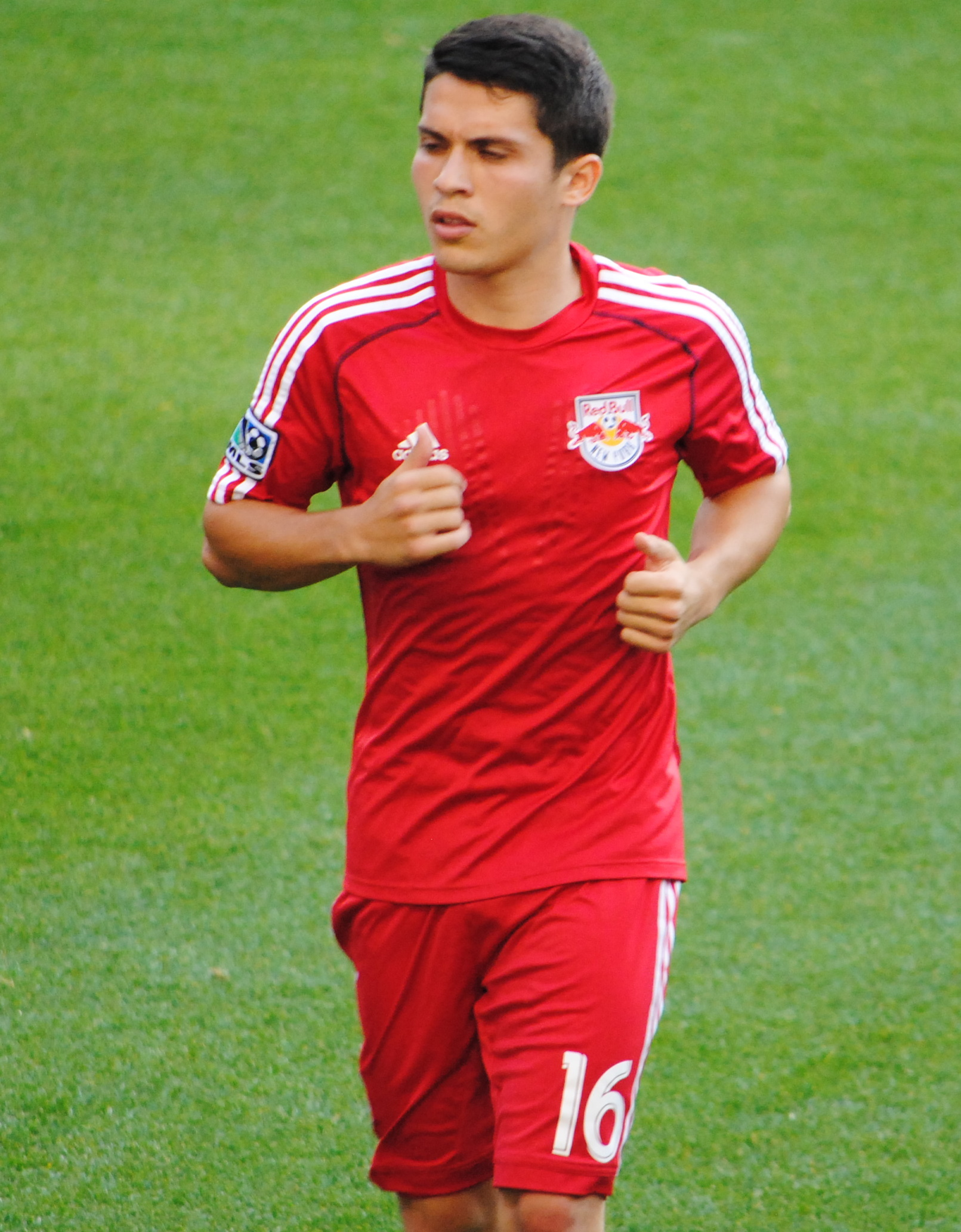
- Connor Lade seen in training

Personal information
- Full name: Connor Cook Lade
- Date of birth: November 16, 1989 (age 36)
- Place of birth: Morristown, New Jersey, United States
- Height: 1.70 m (5 ft 7 in)
- Positions: Defender; midfielder

Youth career
- 2007–2011: New York Red Bulls

College career
Years	Team	Apps	(Gls)
2008–2011	St. John's Red Storm	86	(1)

Senior career*
Years	Team	Apps	(Gls)
2012–2019	New York Red Bulls	126	(2)
2014	→ New York Cosmos (loan)	8	(0)
2015–2018	→ New York Red Bulls II (loan)	4	(0)
Total		138	(2)
- * Club domestic league appearances and goals

Connor Lade (born November 16, 1989) is an American former professional soccer player. As a utility player, he played several positions during his professional career, most commonly as a right back. Lade currently serves as the Senior Manager of Alumni & Player Relations for the New York Red Bulls.

== Career ==
=== College and amateur ===
Lade grew up in the Convent Station section of Morris Township, New Jersey and attended Morristown High School, where he received numerous accolades during his high school career. In December 2007 he joined the U.S. Soccer Development Academy and played with New York Red Bulls Academy. In 2008, he decided to attend St. John's University. Lade was a four-year starter for St. Johns and helped the Red Storm to the 2009 & 2011 Big East tournament title. Lade received the Defensive MVP award in the latter tournament.

During his time in college he remained with the Red Bulls Academy and was a member of the New York Red Bull NPSL squad.

=== Professional ===
Lade was signed by New York Red Bulls as a Home Grown Player on 5 December 2011. Lade made his professional debut for New York on 14 April 2012 in a 2–2 draw with San Jose Earthquakes. On 29 May 2012 Lade scored his first goal for New York in a 3–0 victory over the Charleston Battery in the third round of the US Open Cup.

After struggling to get the playing time he wanted during the 2014 MLS season, Lade was loaned to NASL club New York Cosmos on 28 July 2014. Lade quickly established himself in the Cosmos lineup and appeared in 8 league matches for the club. Lade was recalled by the Red Bulls during the NASL season and on 22 October 2014 scored his lone goal of the season helping the Red Bulls to a 1–1 draw against Montreal Impact in a 2014-15 CONCACAF Champions League match.

Lade was loaned to affiliate side New York Red Bulls II during the 2015 season and made his debut as a starter for the side on 4 April 2015 in a 4–1 victory over Toronto FC II, the first victory in club history. Lade was primarily used as a reserve during the early part of the 2015 season, however an injury to Chris Duvall provided him an opportunity at right back. He received glowing remarks for his play on 9 August 2015 in a 2-0 derby victory over New York City FC by coach Jesse Marsch.

Lade scored his first career MLS goal on 13 July 2016 in a 2–0 victory over Orlando City SC. It was announced on 9 August that Lade would miss the remainder of the 2016 season due to an ACL tear he suffered against the LA Galaxy.

On October 23, 2019, Lade announced his retirement from playing professional soccer.

=== International ===
During his college career Lade participated in training camps as part of the player pool for the United States under-20 national team but did not make any match appearances for the team.

In January 2013 Lade was called up to the U.S. senior national team for a friendly against Canada, but did not make an appearance in the match.

=== Managerial ===
In February 2020, the Red Bulls announced that Lade had been hired as the team's Senior Manager of Alumni & Player Relations. The club described the duties of the role as including "outreach to fellow club alumni, community outreach, media and broadcast opportunities, public appearances and a variety of other responsibilities".

== Honors ==
=== Club ===
New York Red Bulls

- MLS Supporters' Shield (3): 2013, 2015, 2018

== Career statistics ==
Club	Season	League		MLS Cup		US Open Cup		CONCACAF		Total	
Club	Season	Apps	Goals	Apps	Goals	Apps	Goals	Apps	Goals	Apps	Goals
New York Red Bulls	2012	26	0	2	0	2	2	0	0	30	2
New York Red Bulls	2013	5	0	0	0	1	0	0	0	6	0
New York Red Bulls	2014	6	0	2	0	0	0	2	1	10	1
New York Red Bulls	2015	18	0	0	0	3	0	0	0	21	0
New York Red Bulls	2016	18	1	0	0	1	0	1	0	20	1
New York Red Bulls	2017	21	0	1	0	2	0	0	0	24	0
New York Red Bulls	2018	21	0	2	0	2	0	1	0	25	0
New York Red Bulls	2019	11	1	0	0	1	0	4	0	16	1
New York Red Bulls	Total	126	2	7	0	12	2	8	1	153	5
New York Cosmos (loan)	2014	8	0	0	0	0	0	0	0	8	0
New York Red Bulls II (loan)	2015	2	0	0	0	0	0	0	0	2	0
New York Red Bulls II (loan)	2018	2	0	0	0	0	0	0	0	2	0
Career total		138	2	7	0	12	2	8	1	165	5
