= Warren Bobrow =

American mixologist and chef

Warren Bobrow is a mixologist, chef, and writer known as the Cocktail Whisperer. Bobrow is a freelance mixologist specializing in Craft Spirits. He has developed bar programs and implemented their cocktail and ice programs. Warren served as master mixologist for several brands of liquor, including the Busted Barrel rum produced by New Jersey's first licensed distillery since Prohibition.

== Early life and education ==
Bobrow was born in Morristown, New Jersey and raised in Morris Township. He attended Westmont Montessori School and Gill St. Bernard's School before graduating from Morristown-Beard School in 1980. Bobrow then completed his bachelor's degree in communications and film at Emerson College in Boston Massachusetts in 1985. He worked as a dishwasher/pot scrubber at York Harbor, Maine and as a television engineer at both WNET-13, NYC and WPIX-11, NYC also as a videotape editor and cameraman. He later moved to Portland, Maine and worked for Maine Public Broadcasting-TV and Radio, the former Portland, Maine PBS station. Warren is currently a Cannabis Alchemist, presently working on the periphery of known and unknown universe between craft spirits and the cannabis industry.

Bobrow later studied culinary arts at Johnson & Wales University and opened Olde Charleston Pasta in Charleston, South Carolina. The company served as the state's first manufacturer of fresh pasta until Hurricane Hugo devastated its plant. Returning to school after a twenty-year career in private banking, Bobrow studied food writing at New School University and the French Culinary Institute between 2009 and 2010.

== Writing career ==
Bobrow has published six books on mixology and written articles for Saveur magazine, Voda magazine, Forbes Magazine, Whole Foods-Dark Rye, Distiller, Beverage Media, DrinkupNY and many other periodicals. He has written for SoFAB Magazine at the Southern Food and Beverage Museum and has written restaurant reviews for New Jersey Monthly. He has also contributed to the Sage Encyclopedia of Food Issues and the Oxford Encyclopedia edition named Savoring Gotham: A Food Lover's Companion to New York City. Warren taught a Master Classes on untouched rum Warren was a Ministry of Rum Judge in 2010 Warren was a Rum XP Guest Judge at the Miami Rum Fest in 2017 Warren traveled to Asheville, NC to participate in their unique Cocktail Week. Warren attends Tales of the Cocktail in New Orleans and was nominated for a Spirited Award. Warren was in the Saveur Magazine "100" in 2010. Warren presented at the Berlin Bar Convent in 2019 Warren currently writes for Skunk Magazine and Cannabis Cactus Magazine He presented at SXSW in 2018 on Cannabis Cocktails- the topic of his fourth book of six in print.

His six books are: Apothecary Cocktails, Whiskey Cocktails, Bitters and Shrub Syrup Cocktails, Cannabis Cocktails, The Craft Cocktail Compendium, In reprint: Whiskey Cocktails Apothecary Cocktails (French version)

== Clio Cannabis Awards Juror ==
In 2022, Warren Bobrow served as a juror for the Clio Cannabis Awards, an international program recognizing excellence in cannabis marketing and communications.

== La Fête de la Gastronomie ==
In 2012, Bobrow traveled to Burgundy, France to attend La Fête de la Gastronomie, France's national food festival. He was the only food journalist from the United States to participate in the festival.

== Books ==
- Apothecary Cocktails: Restorative Drinks from Yesterday and Today (2013)
- Whiskey Cocktails: Rediscovered Classics and Contemporary Craft Drinks (2014)
- Bitters and Shrub Syrup Cocktails: Restorative Vintage Cocktails, Mocktails & Elixirs (2015)
- Cannabis Cocktails, Mocktails & Tonics: The Art of Spirited Drinks & Buzz-Worthy Libations (2016)
- The Craft Cocktail Compendium: Contemporary Interpretations and Inspired Twists on Time-Honored Classics (2017)
- Apothecary Cocktails: French Version (2015)
- Cannabis Cocktails, Mocktails & Tonics: The Art of Spirited Drinks & Buzz-Worthy Libations/Paperback (2026)
