= Alnwick Hall =

- U.S. National Register of Historic Places
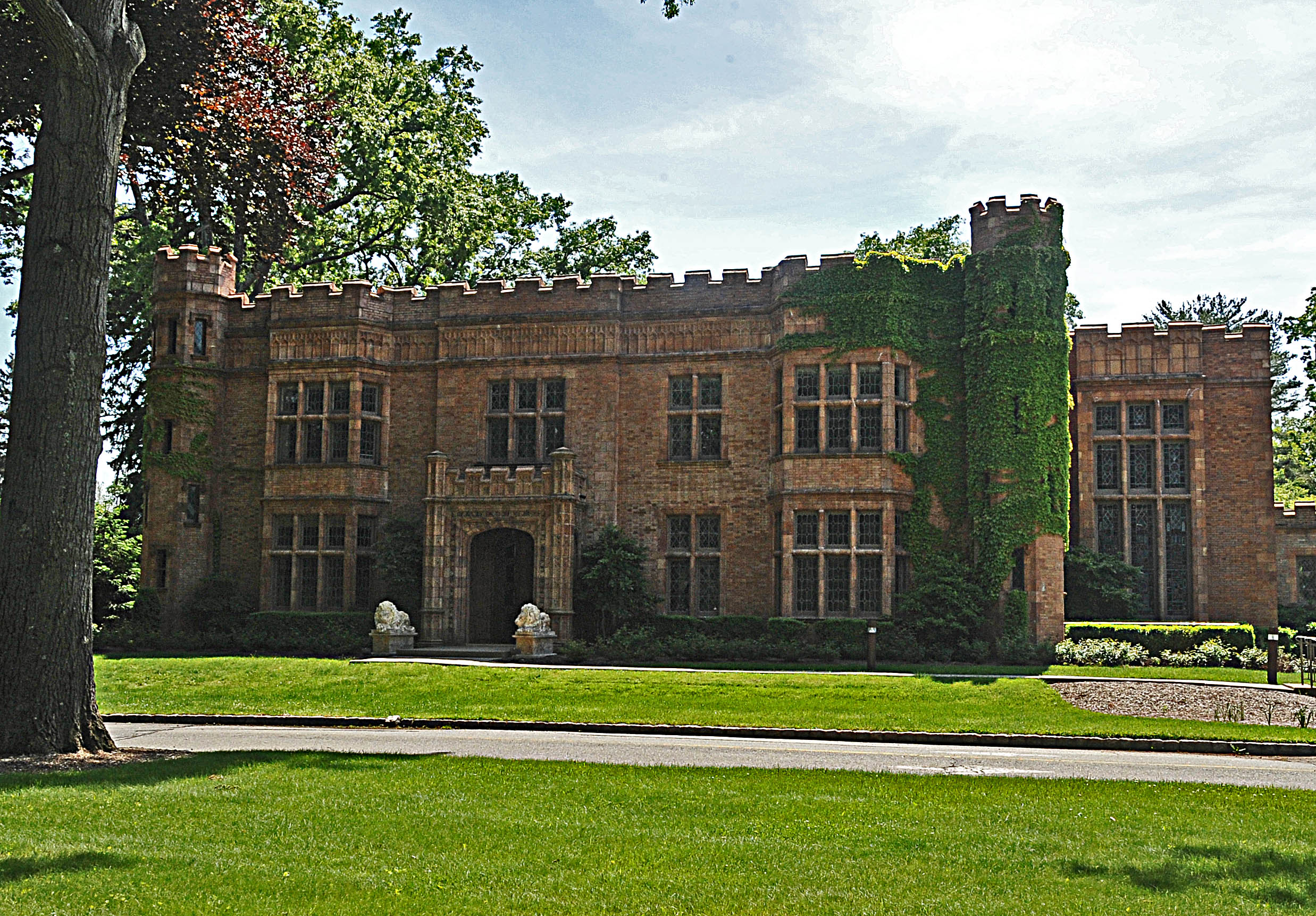

- Location within New Jersey
- Location: 355 Madison Avenue, Morris Township, New Jersey
- Coordinates: 40°46′51″N 74°27′03″W
- Area: 4 acres (1.6 ha)
- Built: 1904
- Architectural style: Late Gothic Revival
- NRHP reference No.: 85000783
- Added to NRHP: April 11, 1985

Alnwick Hall is a historic manor in Morris Township, New Jersey. It was built in 1904 for Edward P. Meany, legal counsel for the American Telephone and Telegraph Company, Judge Advocate General of New Jersey and Vice President of the New Mexico Central and Southern Railway.

Alnwick Hall was designed to resemble Alnwick Castle by architect Percy Griffin. It has been listed on the National Register of Historic Places since April 11, 1985.
