= Normandy Park Historic District =

- U.S. National Register of Historic Places
- U.S. Historic district
- New Jersey Register of Historic Places
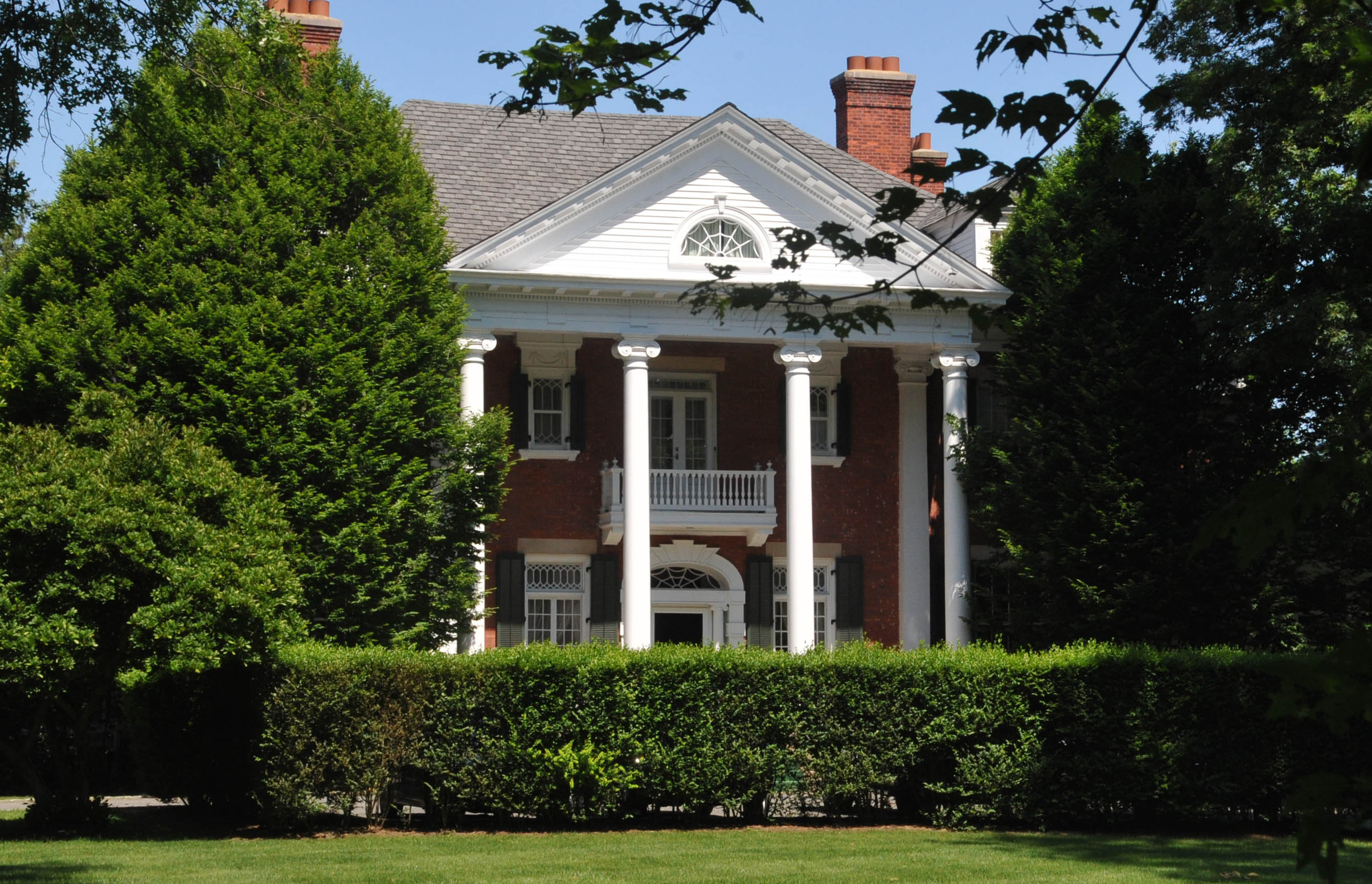
- The Red House at 20 Normandy Parkway

- Location within Morris County, New Jersey Location within New Jersey Location within the United States
- Location: Normandy Parkway, between Columbia Turnpike and Madison Avenue; Morris Township, New Jersey
- Nearest city: Morristown, New Jersey
- Coordinates: 40°47′31″N 74°27′10″W
- Area: 57 acres (23 ha)
- Architect: George Augustus Mills; Robert C. Walsh
- Architectural style: Late Victorian, Late 19th And 20th Century Revivals
- NRHP reference No.: 96001469
- NJRHP No.: 3389

Significant dates
- Added to NRHP: December 6, 1996
- Designated NJRHP: September 30, 1996

The Normandy Park Historic District is a 57-acre (23 ha) historic district located along Normandy Parkway, between Columbia Turnpike and Madison Avenue, in the Convent Station section of Morris Township in Morris County, New Jersey.

It was added to the National Register of Historic Places on December 6, 1996, for its significance in architecture and community planning. The district has 17 contributing buildings and 9 contributing objects.

== History and description ==
Normandy Park is an upscale residential development of villa estates located near Morristown. It was designed by John Dodd Canfield (1845–1910), starting in 1885. George Augustus Mills, a local carpenter, contractor and architect, built many of the first buildings. The district includes examples of Queen Anne, Colonial Revival, and Tudor Revival architectures.

The Red House at 20 Normandy Parkway was built c. 1900 and features Georgian Revival architecture. The house, owned by James Henry Coghill, Sr., was designed by Morristown architect Robert C. Walsh. In 1891, Henry E. Woodward built a summer residence here, which he name Fairacres. It was later bought by Charles F. Clark, president of the Bradstreet Company, now Dun & Bradstreet. His daughter, E. Mabel Clark, used the house until her death. It was later demolished and a new house built on the property in 1955.

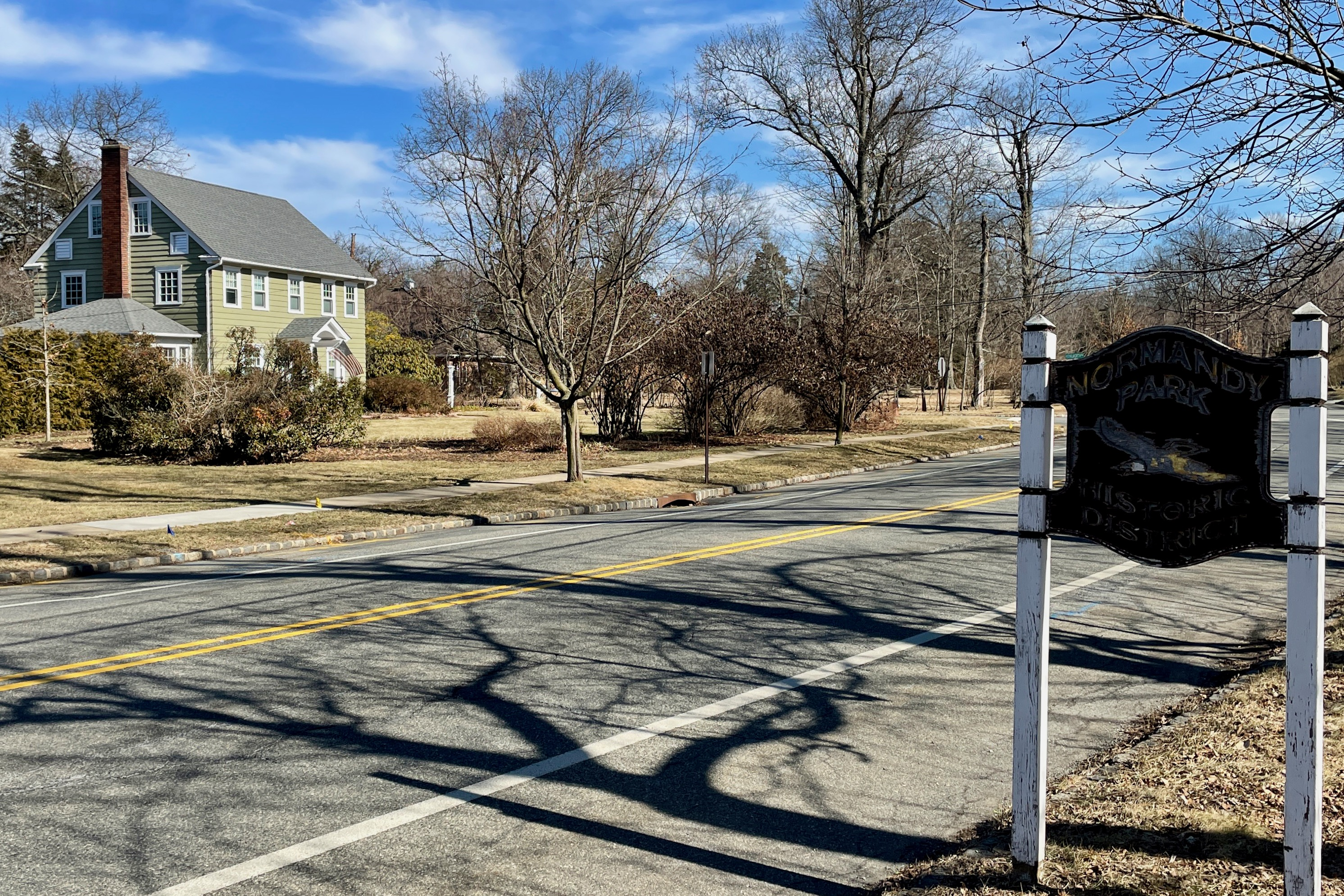
Colonial Revival house and district sign on Normandy Parkway

== See also ==
- National Register of Historic Places listings in Morris County, New Jersey
