= Morris Museum =

Museum in Morristown, New Jersey, United States

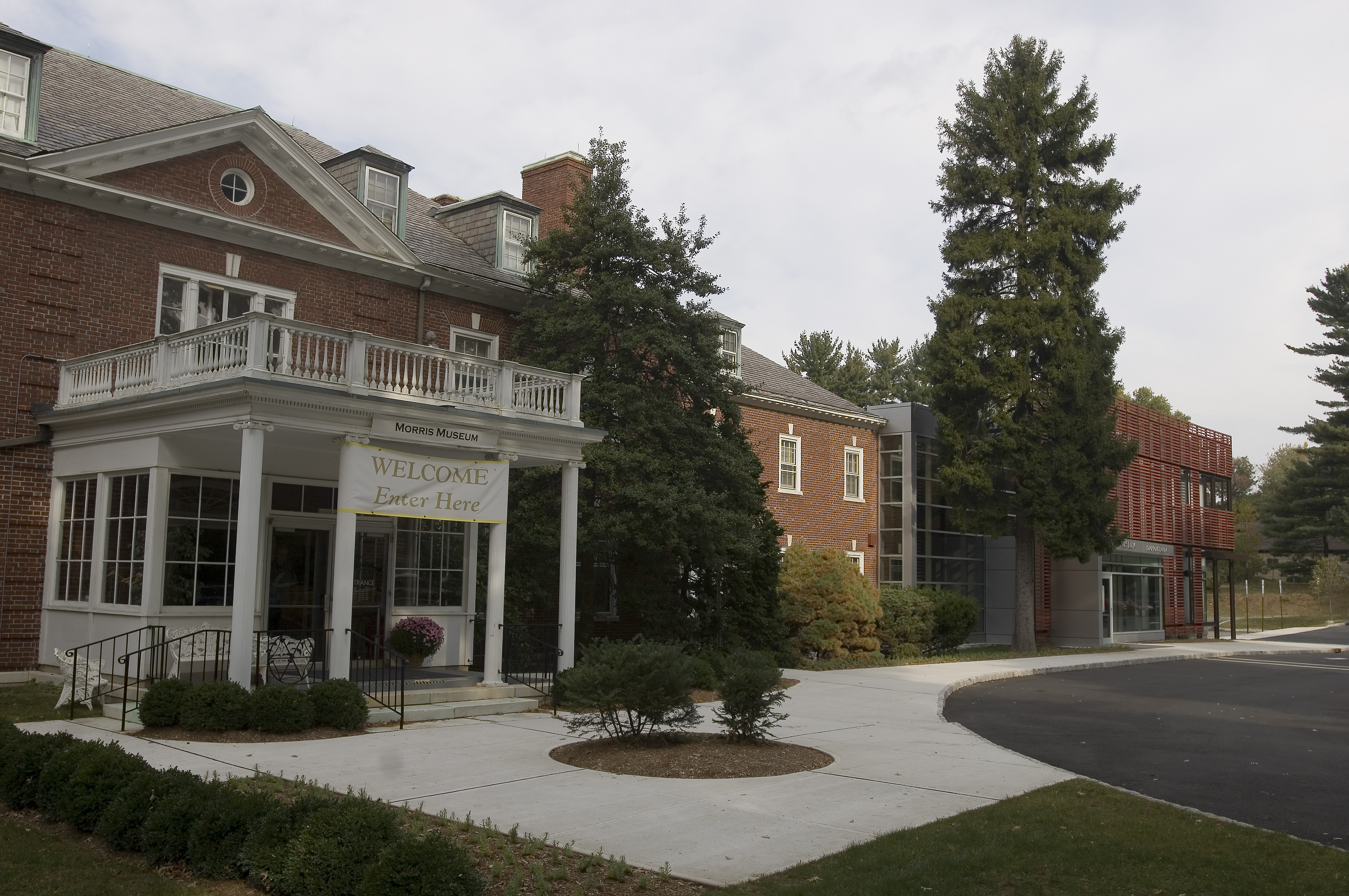
- Former name: Morris Children's Museum, Morris Junior Museum, Morris Museum of Arts and Sciences
- Established: 1913
- Location: 6 Normandy Heights Rd, Morristown, NJ 07960
- Executive director: Tom Loughman
- Website: morrismuseum.org

Actively running since 1913, the Morris Museum is the second-largest museum in New Jersey at 75,524 square feet (7,016.4 m^{2}). The museum is fully accredited by the American Alliance of Museums.

== Museum history ==
=== 1913–1957: early years ===
The Morris Children's Museum was founded in 1913 as a collection of curio cabinets held in the Neighborhood House School in Morristown, New Jersey. In 1922, the Neighborhood House expanded to include an abandoned macaroni factory next to the original school. The Children's Museum continued to grow, eventually taking up two rooms of the factory. In 1938, with approval from the Morristown Board of Education, the museum moved to the Maple Avenue School. The collections of stuffed birds, toys, fossils, and various other articles were housed on the third floor.

The museum was officially incorporated in 1943, and began loaning out exhibits to local schools and libraries. Previously a volunteer-based organization, the museum hired its first director, Chester H. Newkirk, in 1956. The museum continued to acquire more collections, opening a Native American exhibit in 1949. The museum expanded in 1957, purchasing and relocating to 141 Madison Avenue. The museum also changed its name from the "Morris Children's Museum" to the "Morris Junior Museum".

=== 1958–present day ===
In 1963 the Morris Junior Museum purchased the Twin Oaks Mansion, today the current site of the museum. The mansion was previously owned by the Frelinghuysen family, a political family and members of the New York social scene. Constructed between 1910 and 1913, the Neo-Georgian mansion features frieze work that is still intact to this day. The new museum reopened its doors in 1965, then expanded in 1969 adding several galleries and a theater to the museum property. With this expansion came another name change, this time to the "Morris Museum of Arts and Sciences".

The museum was officially accredited by the American Association of Museums in 1972. Due to increasing financial demands, the museum added an entrance fee in 1976. The museum changed its name again in 1985, taking its current name, the Morris Museum. The museum saw another expansion in 1989 with work finishing in 1990. The museum now encompasses 75,524 square feet, with several permanent collections and an active theater.

== Exhibits and collections ==
The Morris Museum has several permanent exhibits, with collections focusing on local wildlife, musical boxes, automata and history. These include a fossil exhibit, a natural science exhibit, minerals, textiles, a Native American collection, and a model train room. There is also the Dodge Room dedicated to Geraldine Rockefeller Dodge, a philanthropist and Morristown resident. The room features several paintings and sculptures relating to Dodge's philanthropy, especially surrounding her work with animals. Throughout the year, temporary and traveling exhibits can also be viewed, including several art galleries featuring local and enrolled student artists.

The museum has several outreach programs, including a loan program for local educators.

=== Murtogh D. Guinness Collection ===
The museum was awarded the Murtogh D. Guinness Collection in 2003. The exhibit opened in 2007 and covers 5,000 square feet (460 m^{2}). The permanent exhibit displays 150 pieces, while the overall collection consists of 750 pieces of mechanical musical instruments and automata. Various pieces not currently on display are displayed in visible storage found in the museum's basement. A daily demonstration of the automata and music boxes is offered every day at 2:00 pm. A bi-yearly convention, AutomataCon, began at the museum in 2016. The convention centers around automata and their creation, and was hosted by the museum again in 2018.

=== Kinetic Art ===
In 2017 the museum announced its four-year exhibition series, "A Cache of Kinetic Art" focusing on kinetic and moving art. The exhibits feature art from new and established artists from around the world. The series opened in spring of 2018 with the "Curious Characters" exhibition, which focused on the expression of distinctive figural forms, from traditional to abstract. Exhibitions planned for the following years include "Simply Steampunk", "Tiny Intricacies", and "Timeless Movement".

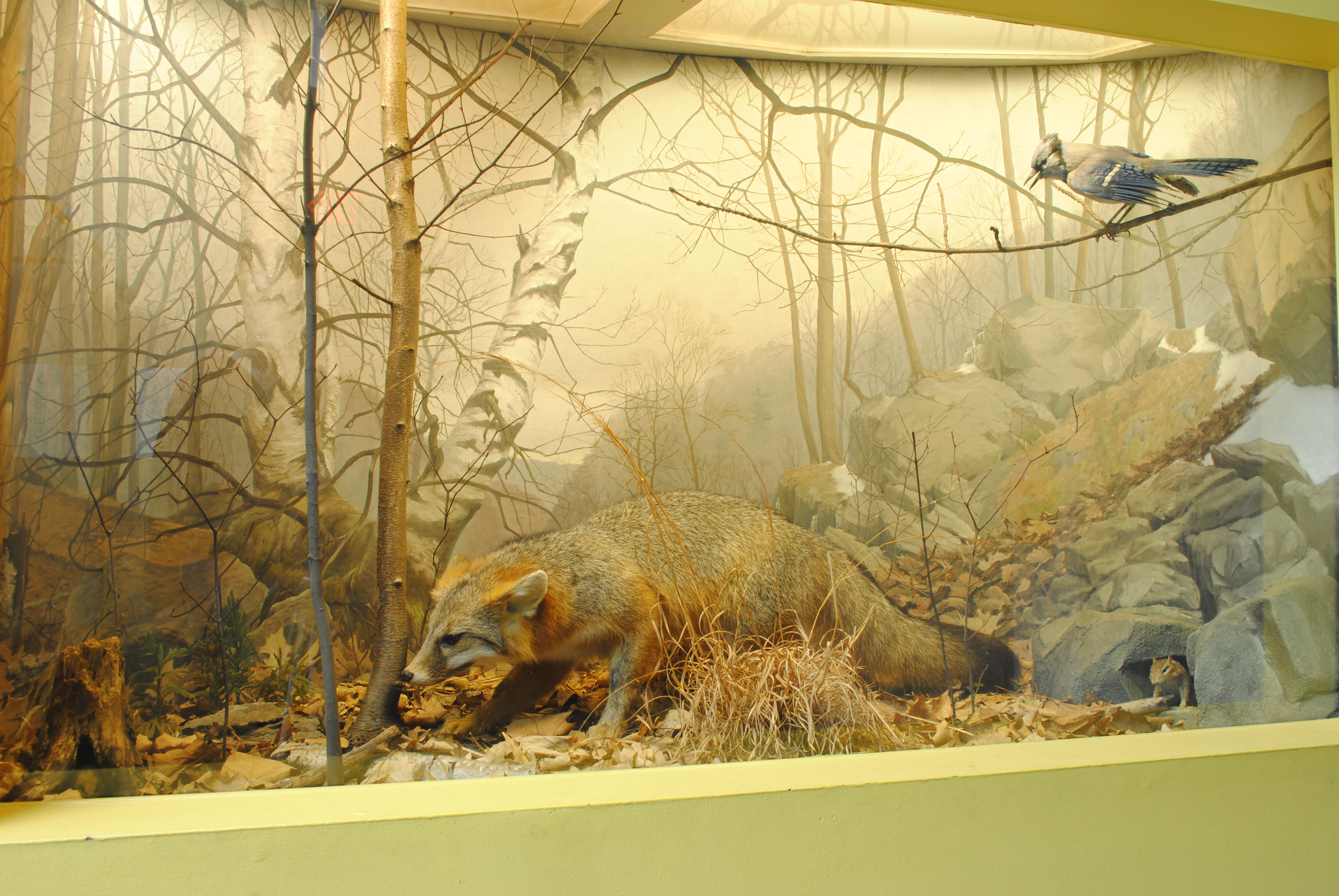
A taxidermy fox and bird, part of the mammals exhibit at the Morris Museum

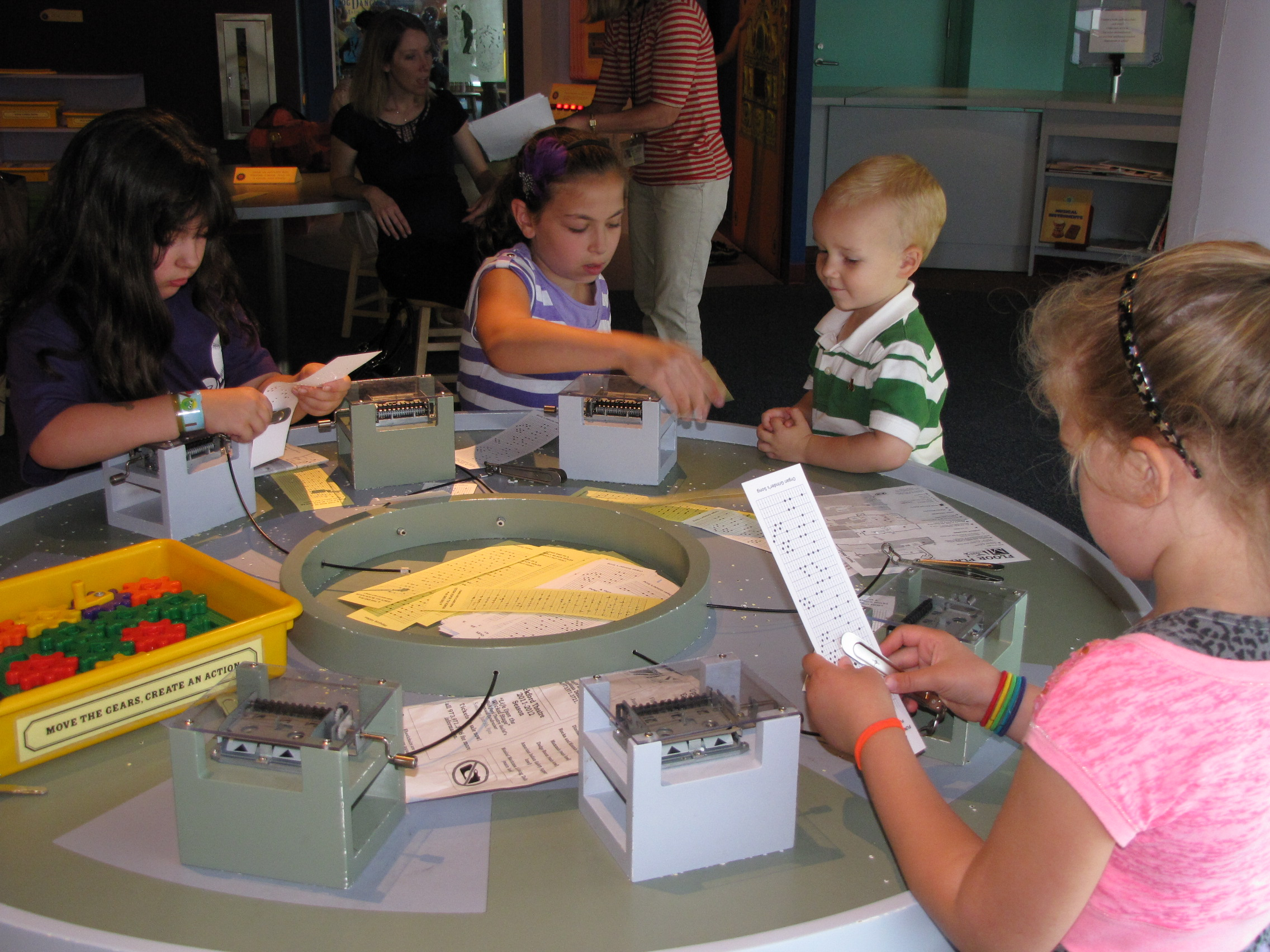
Children playing in the interactive area of the Guinness Collection.

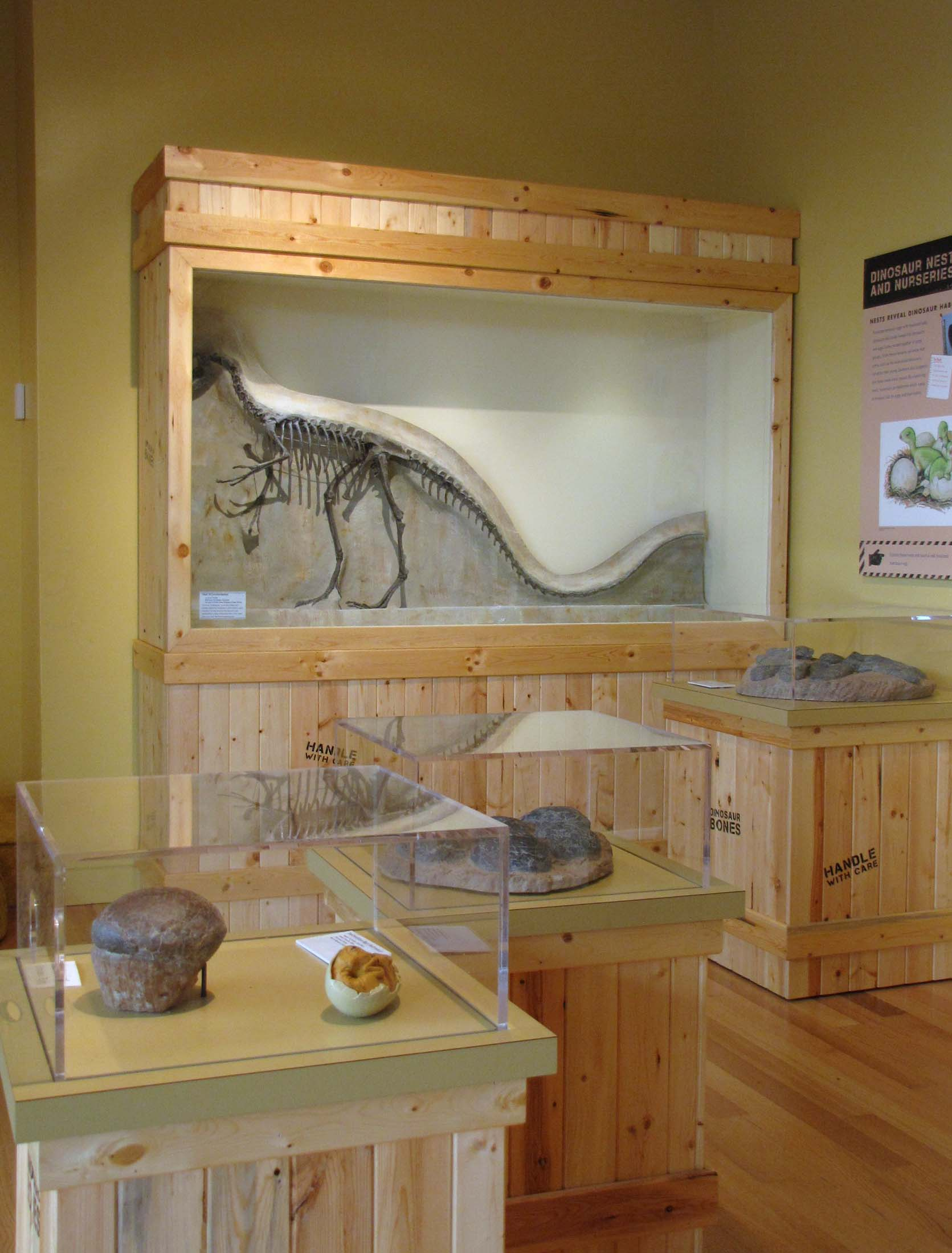
A section of the Digging Dinos exhibit at the Morris Museum.

== See also ==
- List of music museums
