= John Smith House (Washington Valley, New Jersey) =

Historic house in New Jersey, United States

- U.S. National Register of Historic Places
- U.S. Historic district – Contributing property
- New Jersey Register of Historic Places
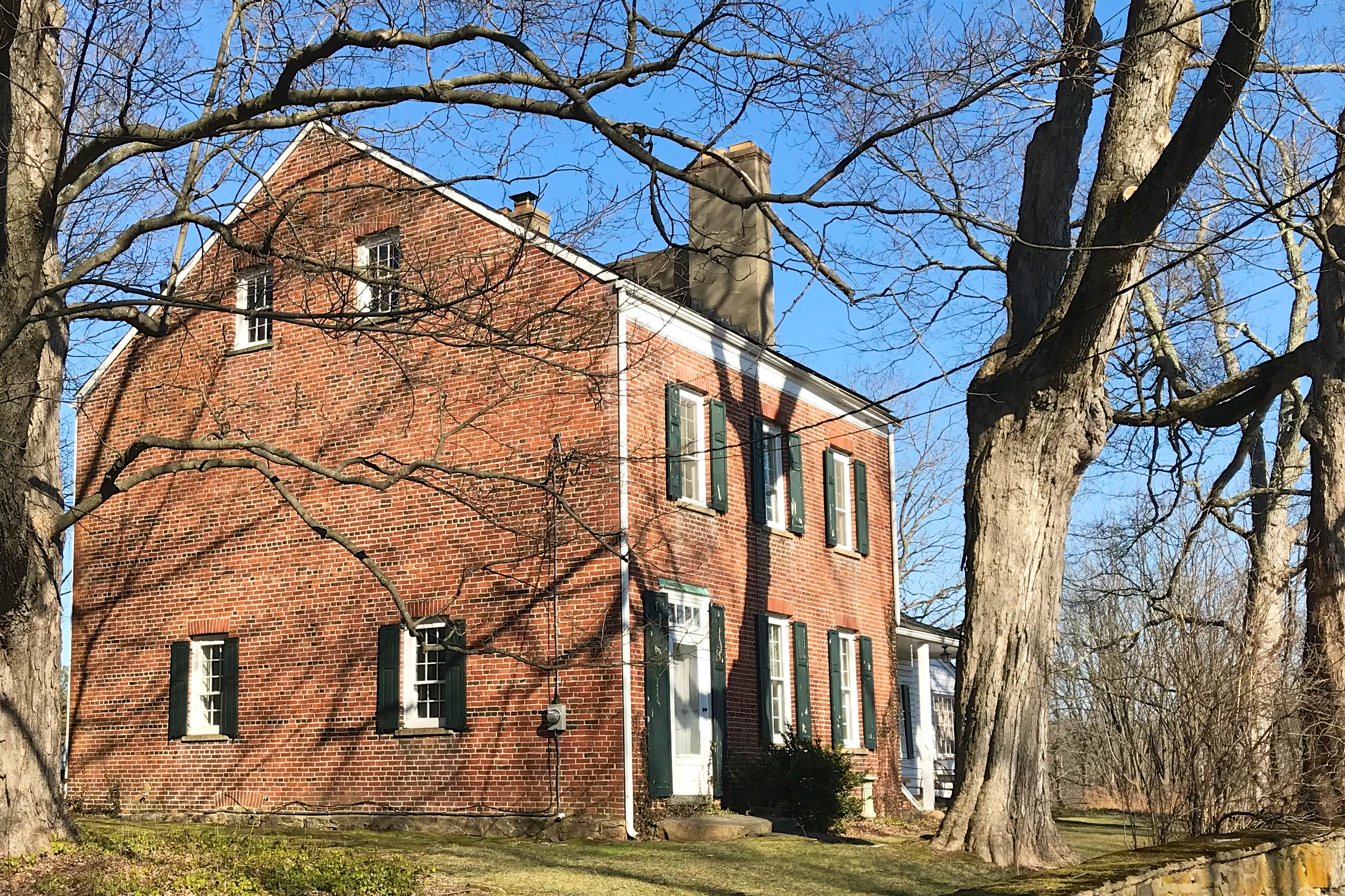
- John Smith House, 2018

- Location within Morris County, New Jersey Location within New Jersey Location within the United States
- Location: Washington Valley Road, Washington Valley, New Jersey
- Coordinates: 40°48′20″N 74°31′37″W
- Area: 1 acre (0.40 ha)
- Built: 1812
- Part of: Washington Valley Historic District (ID92001583)
- NRHP reference No.: 76001176
- NJRHP No.: 2177

Significant dates
- Added to NRHP: January 1, 1976
- Designated CP: November 12, 1992
- Designated NJRHP: September 22, 1975

The John Smith House is a historic building located at 124 Washington Valley Road in the Washington Valley section of Morris Township in Morris County, New Jersey, United States. It was documented by the Historic American Buildings Survey (HABS) in 1937. The house was added to the National Register of Historic Places on January 1, 1976, for its significance in agriculture and architecture. It was designated a contributing property of the Washington Valley Historic District on November 12, 1992.

== History and description ==
John Smith was born in Caldwell, New Jersey. In 1798, he purchased 140 acres (57 ha) of land here. He was a member of the Presyterian Church in Morristown and a trustee of the Washington Valley Schoolhouse. The house has two sections. The oldest is a one and one-half frame structure dated as 18th century. It was moved and attached to the main section in 1812. The main section is a two-story red brick building constructed in 1812, with the year set in black brick on the west gable. After Smith's death in 1855, the property was inherited by his son, Jonathan Hugh Smith. He improved the productivity of the farm by adding limestone and built a lime kiln on the property. He was a member of the South Street Presbyterian Church and also a trustee of the schoolhouse.

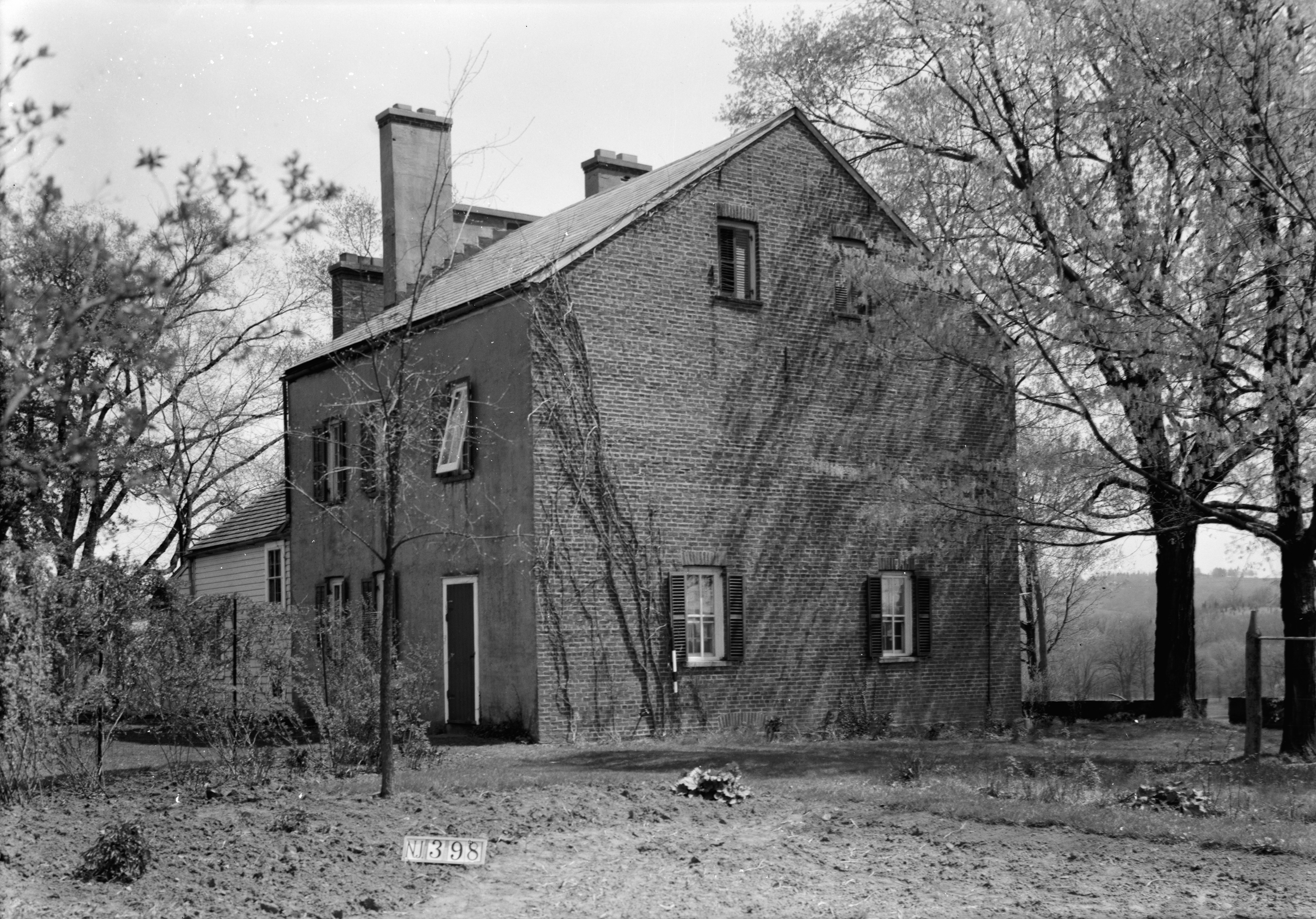
HABS photo from 1937

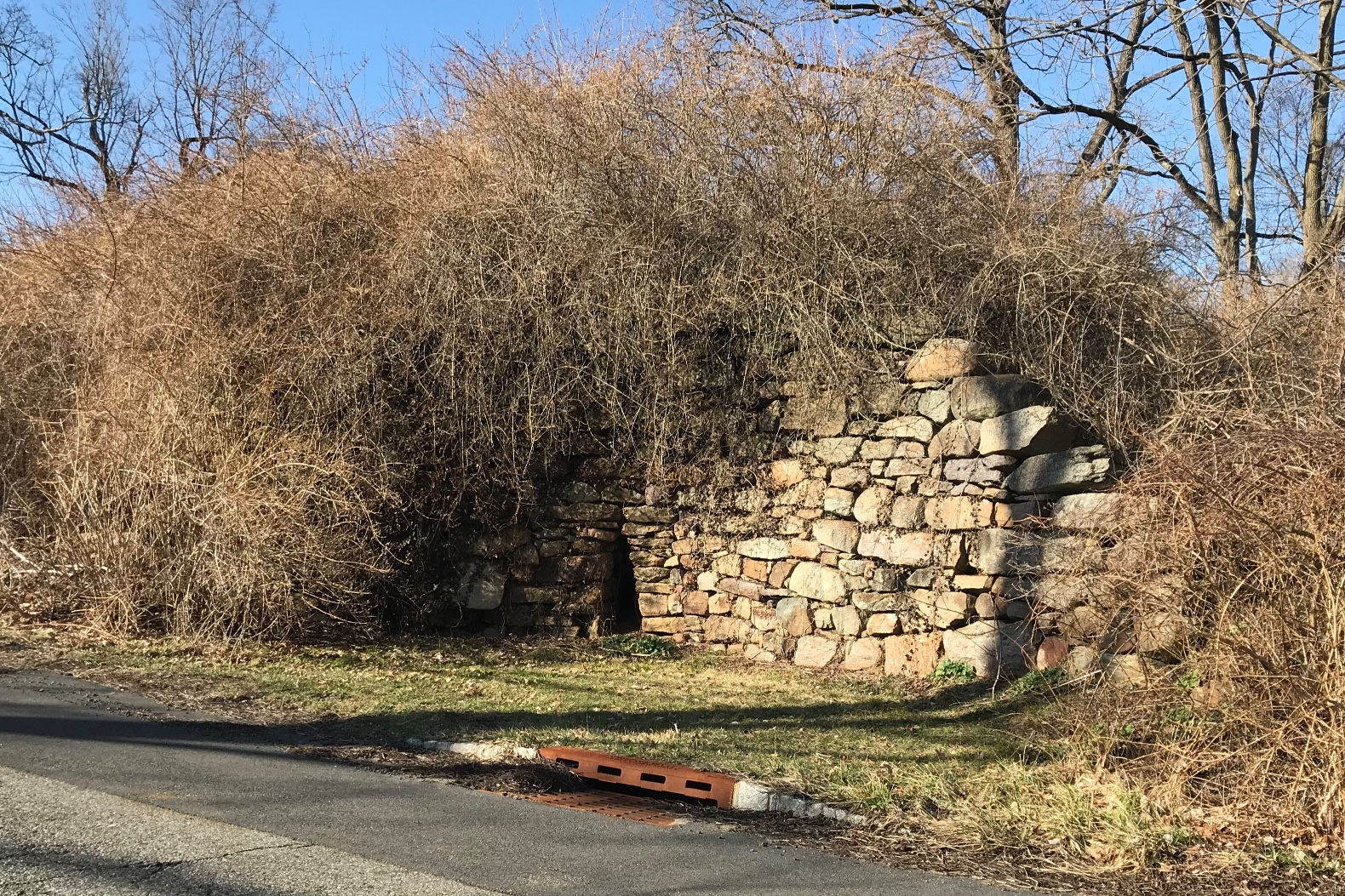
Lime kiln ruins

== See also ==
- National Register of Historic Places listings in Morris County, New Jersey
