= Washington Valley, New Jersey =

Populated place in Morris County, New Jersey, US

- Unincorporated community
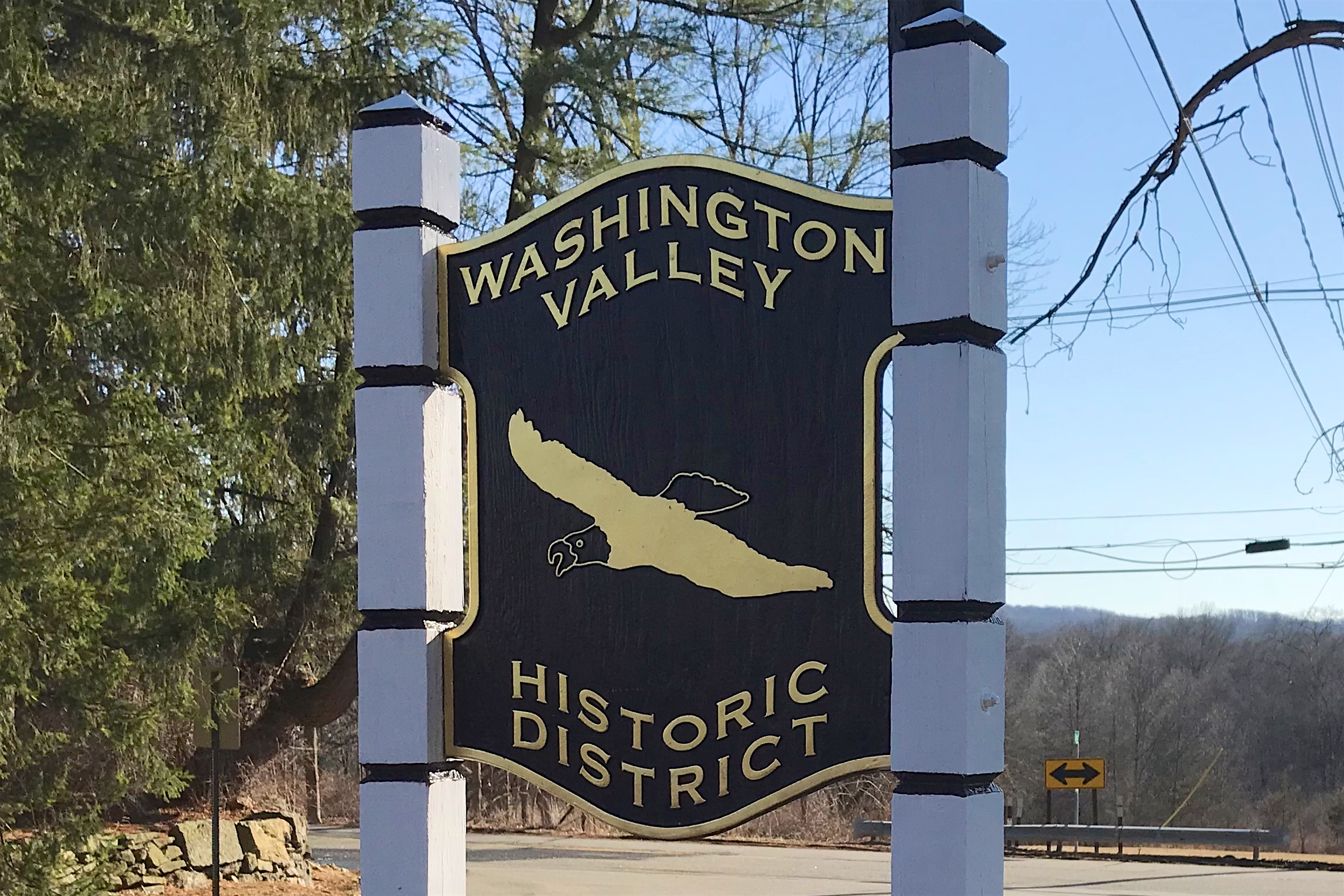
- Washington Valley Historic District sign

- Location within Morris County, New Jersey Location within New Jersey Location within the United States
- Coordinates: 40°48′20″N 74°31′38″W
- Country: United States
- State: New Jersey
- County: Morris
- Township: Morris and Mendham
- Elevation: 371 ft (113 m)
- GNIS feature ID: 881602

- Washington Valley Historic District
- U.S. National Register of Historic Places
- U.S. Historic district
- New Jersey Register of Historic Places
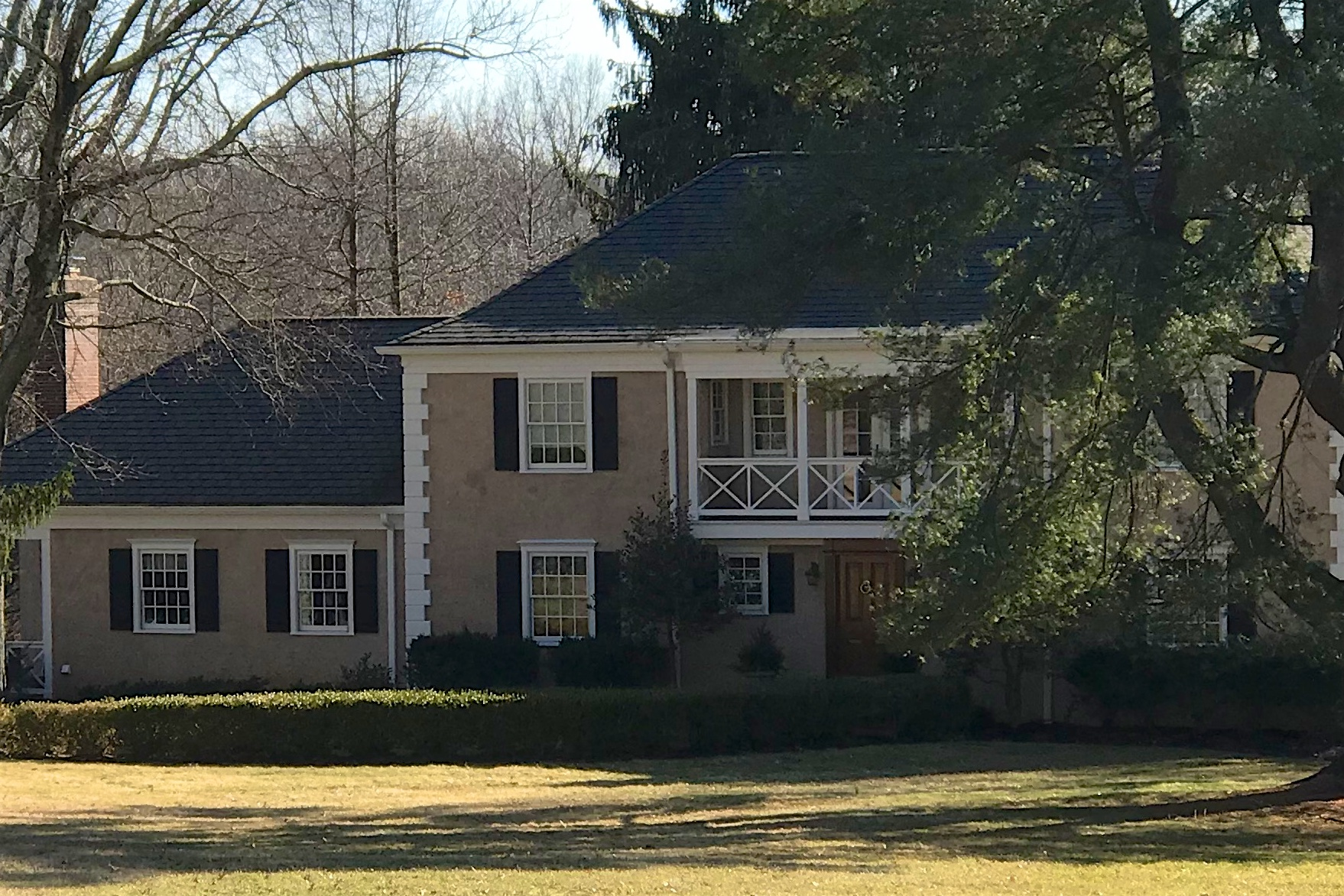
- French Eclectic Revival architecture, 2018
- Nearest city: Morristown, New Jersey
- Area: 1,883 acres (762 ha)
- Built: 1881
- Architectural style: Late 19th And 20th Century Revivals, Late Victorian, Federal
- NRHP reference No.: 92001583
- NJRHP No.: 2179

Significant dates
- Added to NRHP: November 12, 1992
- Designated NJRHP: September 18, 1992

Washington Valley is an unincorporated community in the Whippany River valley in Morris Township and extending into Mendham Township in Morris County, in the U.S. state of New Jersey.

Washington Valley is popularly known for farmsteads of the late 18th and early 19th century, but their appearance and survival is the legacy of wealthy estate builders who acquired properties and moved there at the end of the 19th century.

== History ==
=== Munsee Lenape ownership ===
Circa 1000, the land was inhabited by the Munsee Lenape. Circa 1500, Morris County was part of the Lenapehoking.

Arrowheads found in Munsee encampments throughout the Washington Valley suggest that they hunted wolf, elk, and wild turkey for game. They likely ate mussels from the Whippany River.

In the 17th century, Munsee Lenape fishermen made an annual pilgrimage from the Washington Valley to the Minisink island on the Delaware River, in part to procure shellfish. Local farmer and philanthropist Caroline Foster has said it is likely that Munsee farmers cultivated corn in the summertime in the fields of the Washington Valley.

==== Forced relocation ====
In 1757, the New Jersey Society for Helping Indians expelled the Munsee Lenape from their native land.

Led by Reverend John Brainerd, colonists forcefully relocated 200 people to a land reservation named Brotherton in Burlington County, an industrial town known for gristmills and sawmills. It was later known as Indian Mills. This was the first Native American reservation in New Jersey.

The Munsee Lenape's community leaders wrote multiple treaties, including a 1780 treaty to denounce selling any more land to white settlers. In 1796, the Oneidas of New Stockbridge invited the Munsee Lenape to join their reservation. A 1798 treaty announced their refusal to leave "our fine place in Jersey."

However, in 1801, many of the Munsee Lenape families agreed to move to New Stockbridge, New York to join the Oneidas, except for some families that stayed behind.

In 1822, the remaining families were moved again by white colonists, over 900 miles' travel away, to Green Bay, Wisconsin.

=== Colonial ownership ===
In 1757, English colonists established Washington Valley Road.

=== American ownership ===
In the 18th century, Washington Valley became a suburb of the city of Morristown; residents would travel into town for church services and to sell farm products. A schoolhouse is the only non-residential historic building in Washington Valley, displaying its lack of significant local commerce and industry. The legacy of its connection to Morristown continues today.

In 1806, the Washington Turnpike was built as an improvement to an 18th-century road. Today the turnpike is referred to as Mendham Road and New Jersey Route 24.

In 1852, the district was first referred to as Washington Valley by school superintendents, who created the Washington Valley School District.

Circa 1960, the Morris County Municipal Utilities Authority purchased land along the Whippany River in an effort to construct a reservoir. In 1960, as a response, local residents including Barbara Hoskins and Caroline Foster of Fosterfields wrote and published Washington Valley: An Informal History to prevent reservoir development in Washington Valley. The effort was successful as the Morris County Municipal Utilities Authority turned over its acreage to the Morris County Park Commission.

== Historic properties ==
There are several historic properties in the encompassing Washington Valley Historic District, which was added to the National Register of Historic Places on November 12, 1992 for its significance in agriculture, architecture, education, transportation, and community planning. The district includes 117 contributing buildings, 17 contributing structures, one contributing object and one contributing site. The Washington Valley Historic District covers nearly 2,000 acres (810 ha) centered on the upper reaches of the Whippany River and retains a pastoral setting in sharp contrast to the suburban development in communities surrounding the valley.

The Washington Valley Schoolhouse, a one-room schoolhouse built in 1869 and located at the intersection of Washington Valley Road and Schoolhouse Lane, was added to the NRHP on October 15, 1973.

The John Smith House, built in 1812 and located at 124 Washington Valley Road, was added to the NRHP on January 1, 1976.

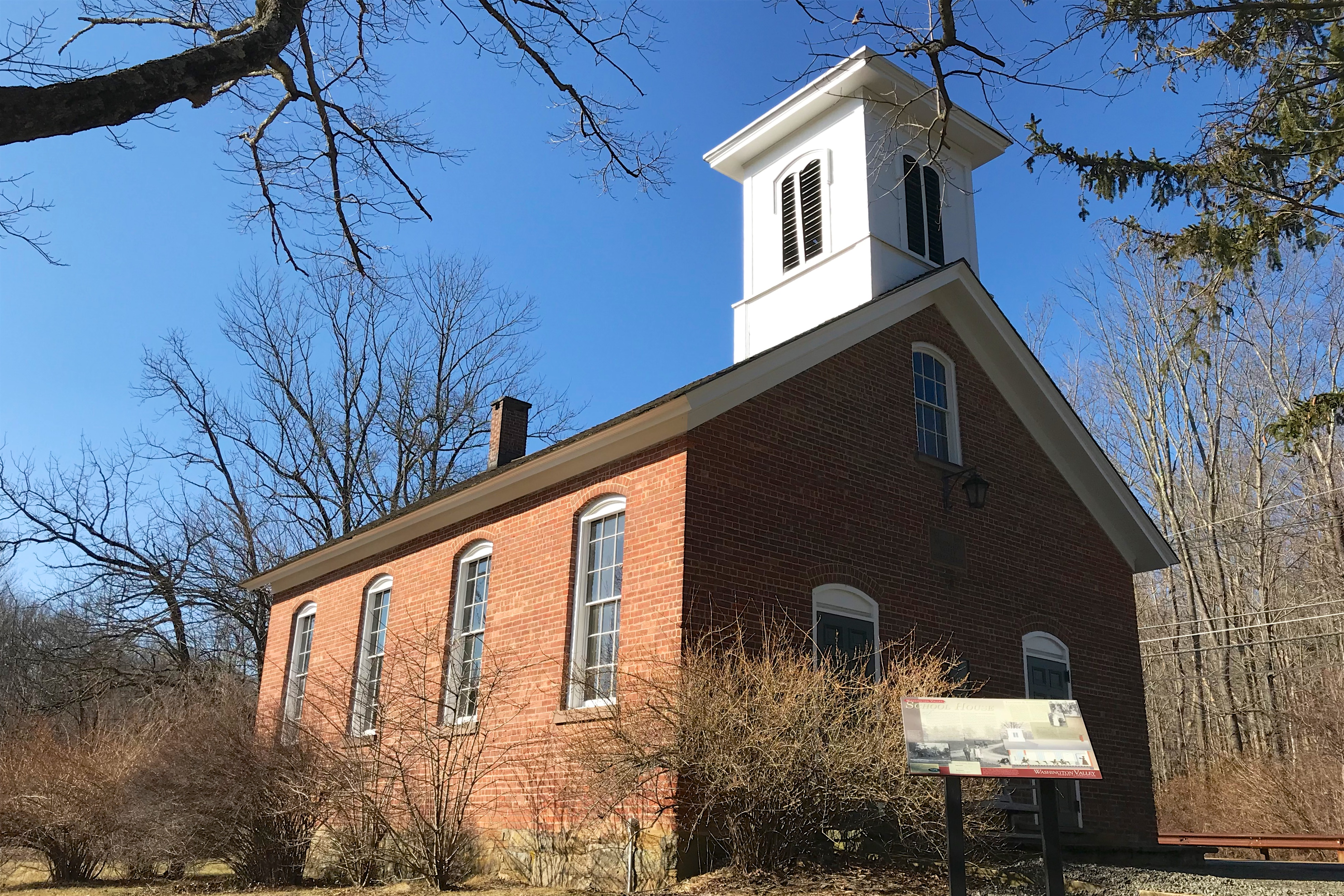
Washington Valley Schoolhouse

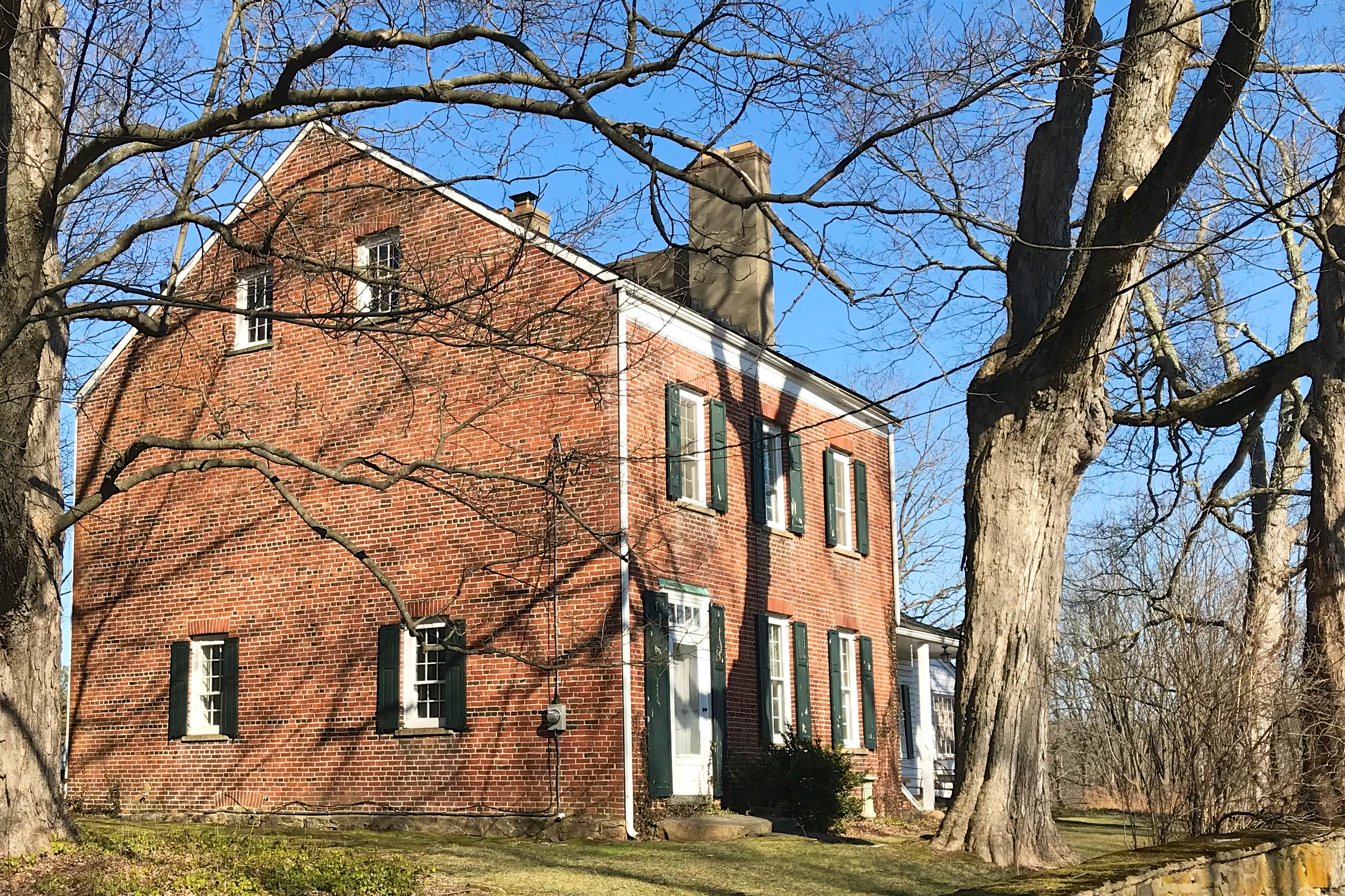
John Smith House

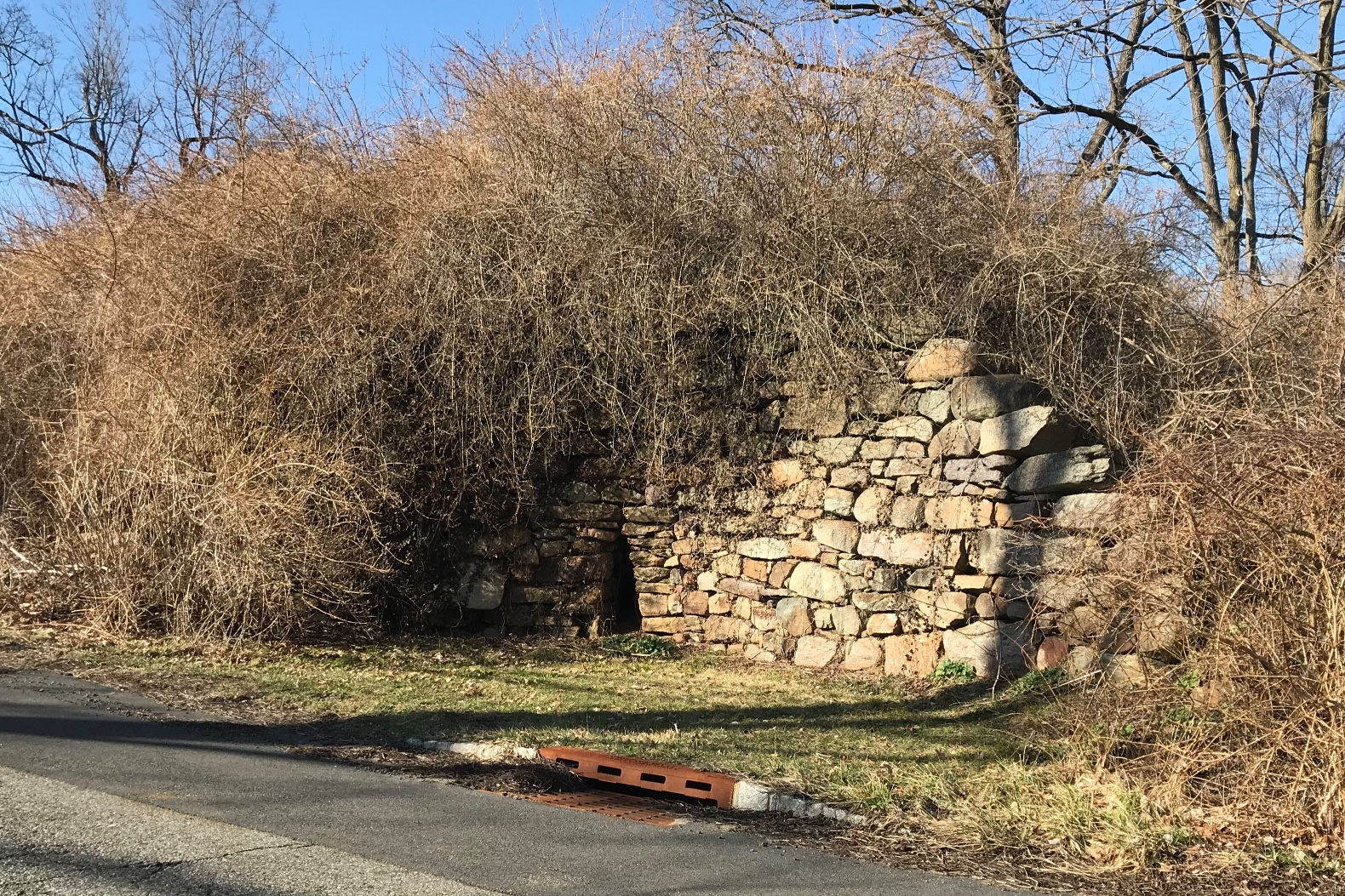
Lime kiln by John Smith House

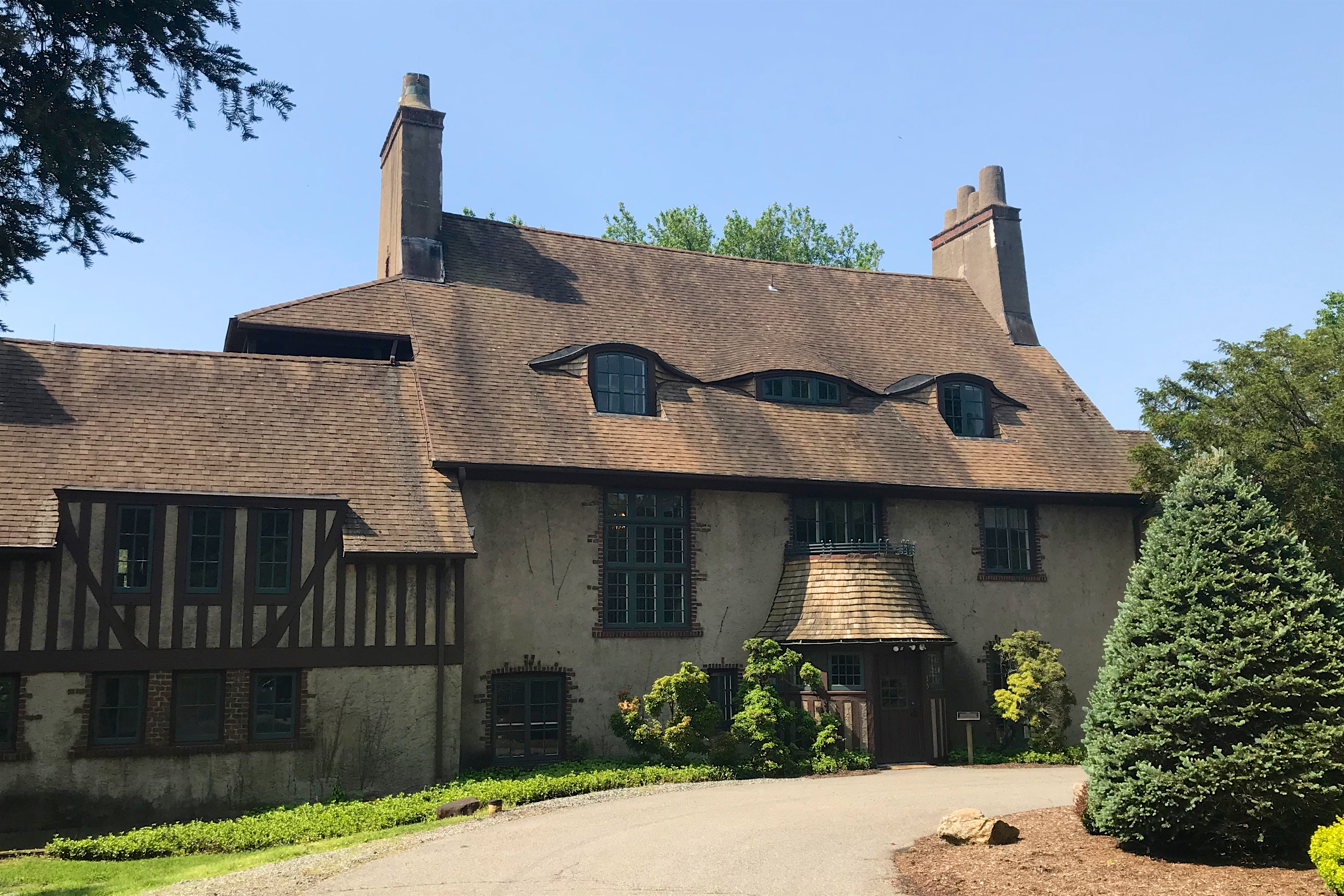
Topsides, Rawles estate

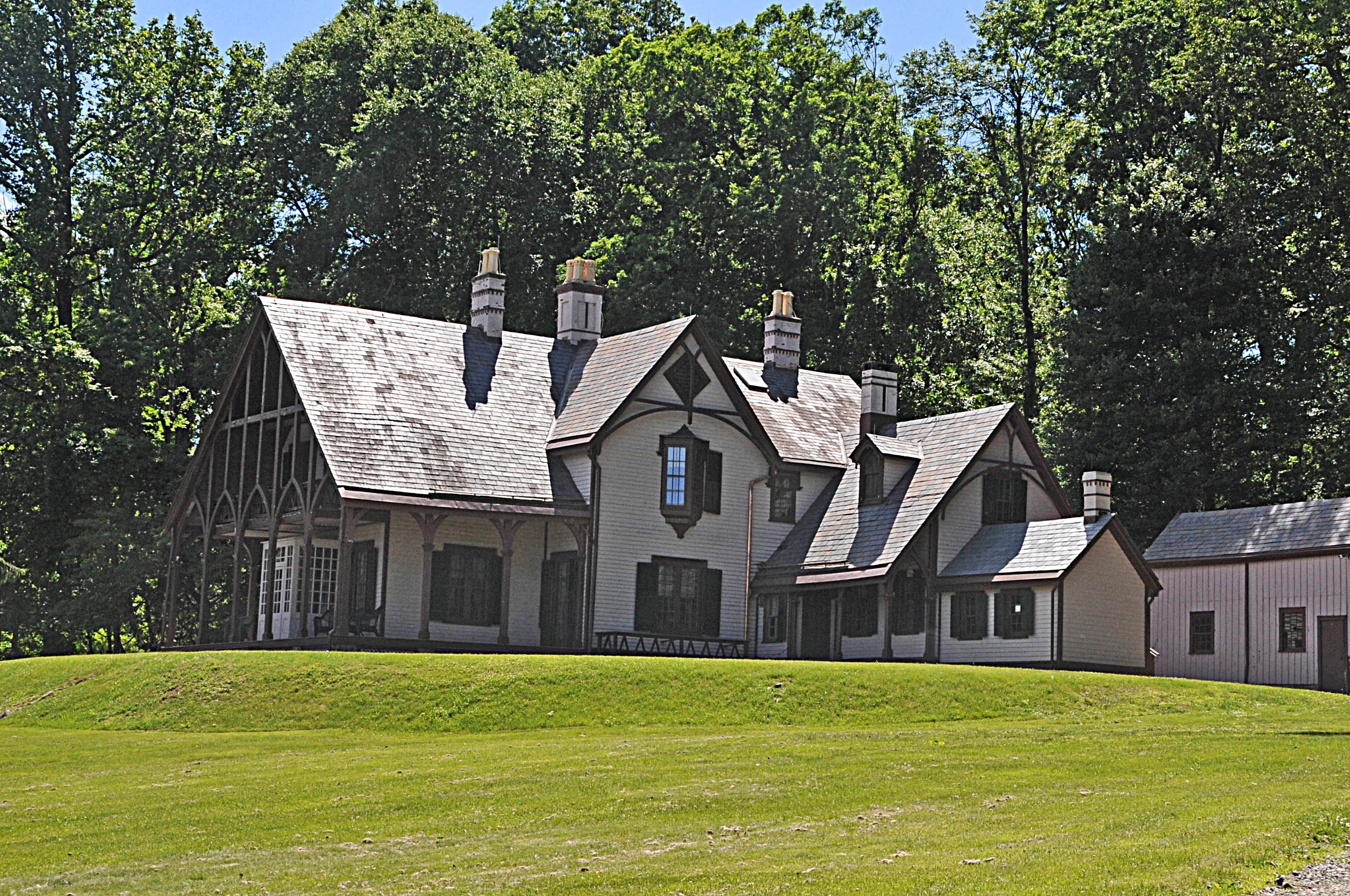
Joseph W. Revere House

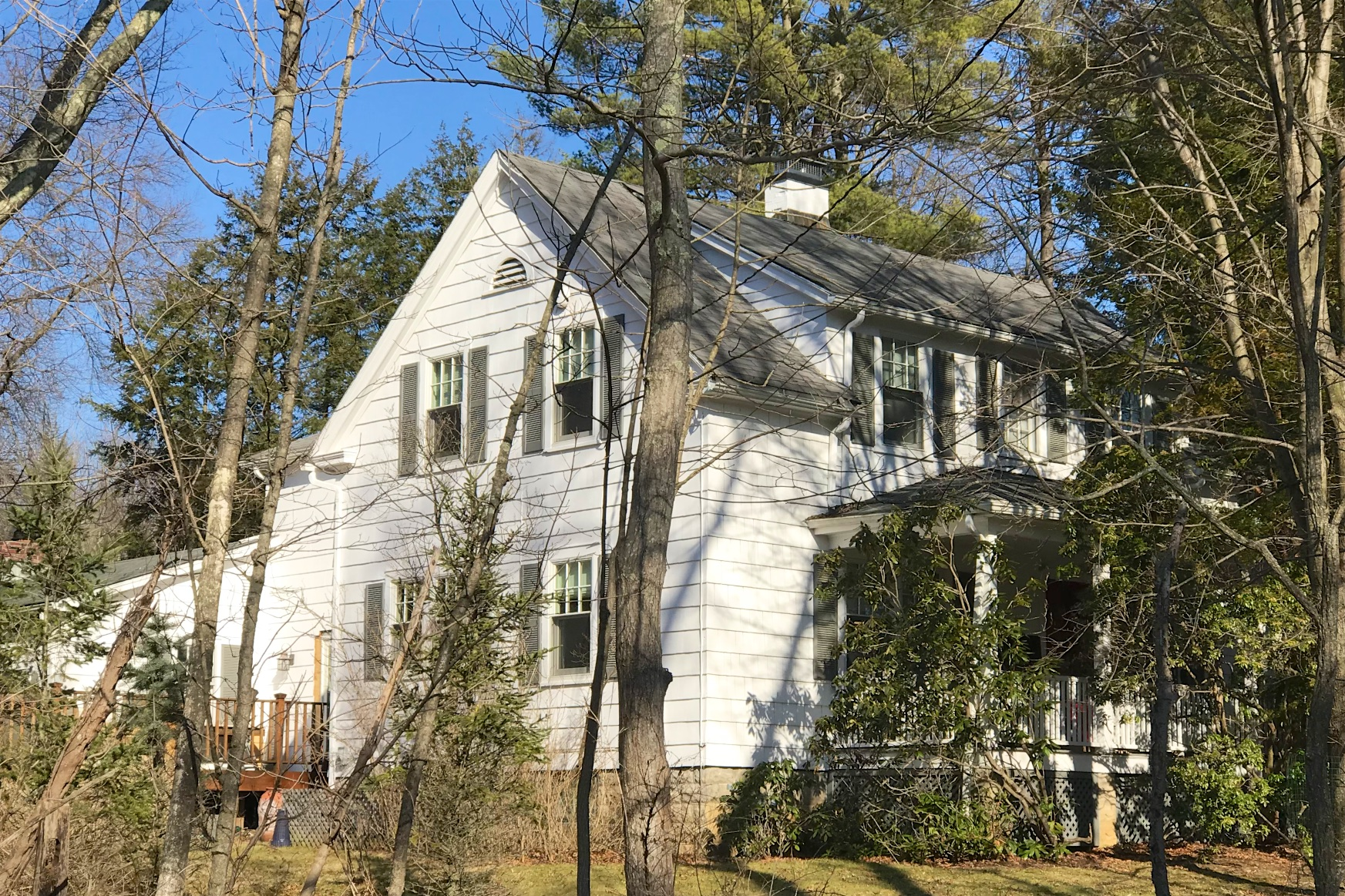
Colonial Revival Cottage

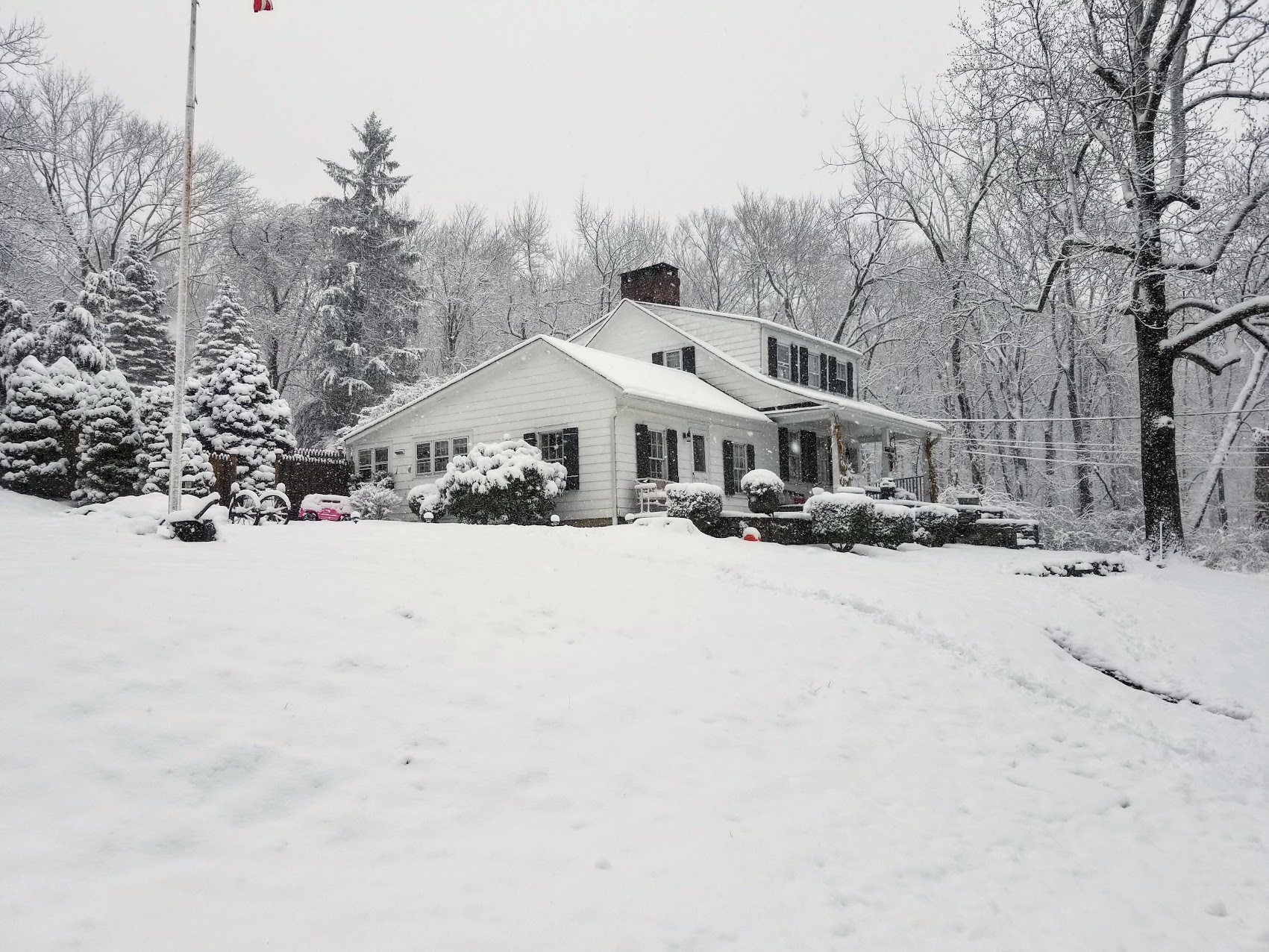
Samuel Alward House
