= Washington Valley Schoolhouse =

- U.S. National Register of Historic Places
- U.S. Historic district – Contributing property
- New Jersey Register of Historic Places
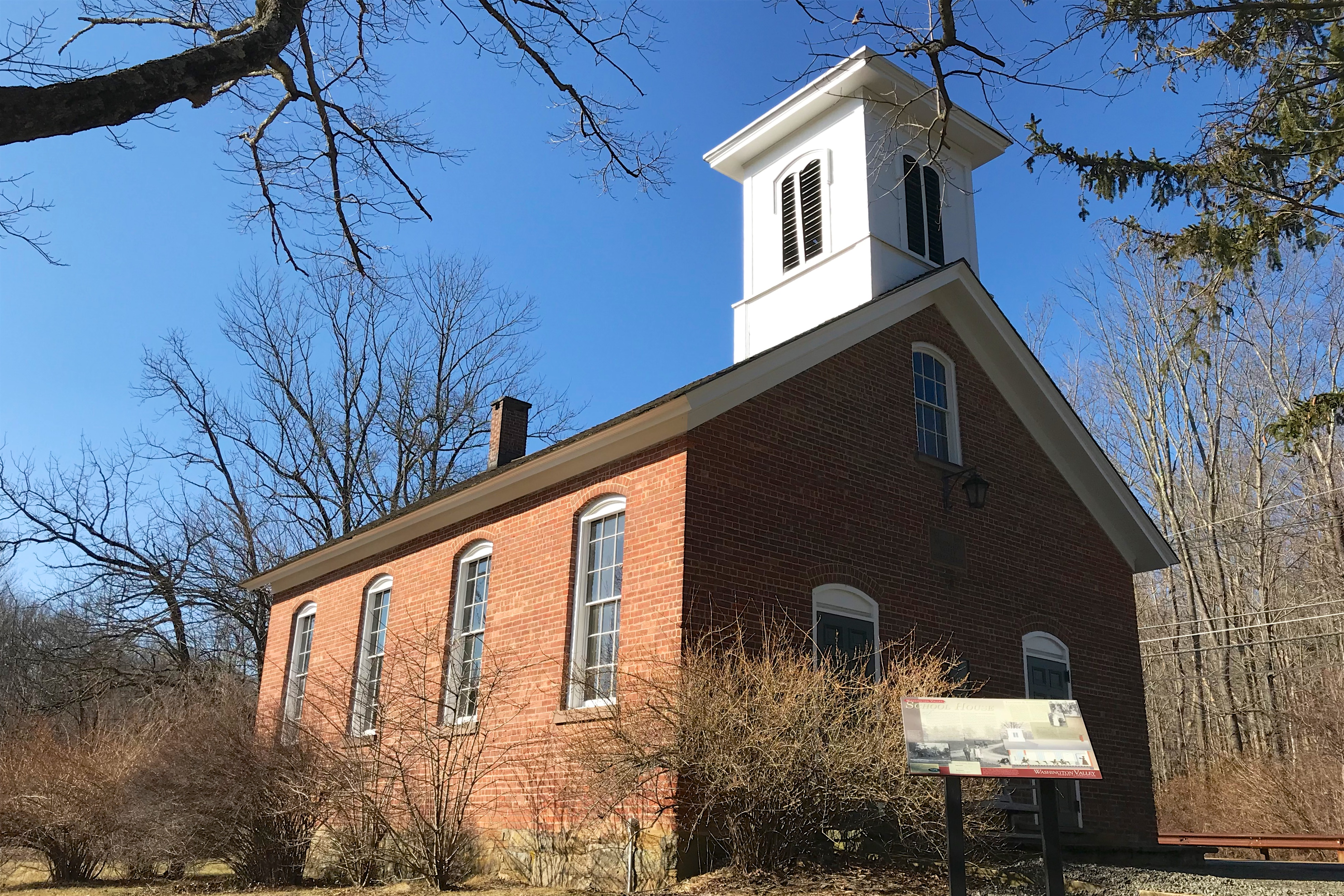
- Washington Valley Schoolhouse, 2018

- Location within Morris County, New Jersey Location within New Jersey Location within the United States
- Location: Washington Valley Road and Schoolhouse Lane, Morris Township, New Jersey
- Coordinates: 40°48′22″N 74°31′52″W
- Area: 1 acre (0.40 ha)
- Built: 1869
- Part of: Washington Valley Historic District (ID92001583)
- NRHP reference No.: 73001130
- NJRHP No.: 2173

Significant dates
- Added to NRHP: October 15, 1973
- Designated CP: November 12, 1992
- Designated NJRHP: September 6, 1973

The Washington Valley Schoolhouse, also known as the Little Red Schoolhouse, is located at the intersection of Washington Valley Road and Schoolhouse Lane in the Washington Valley section of Morris Township in Morris County, New Jersey, United States. The schoolhouse was built in 1869 and was added to the National Register of Historic Places on October 15, 1973, for its significance in education. It was designated a contributing property of the Washington Valley Historic District on November 12, 1992.

== History and description ==
The first schoolhouse was built here in 1813. It was replaced by the current building in 1869. The one-room schoolhouse was built with red brick. The one and one-half story building has a gable roof with cupola for the bell.

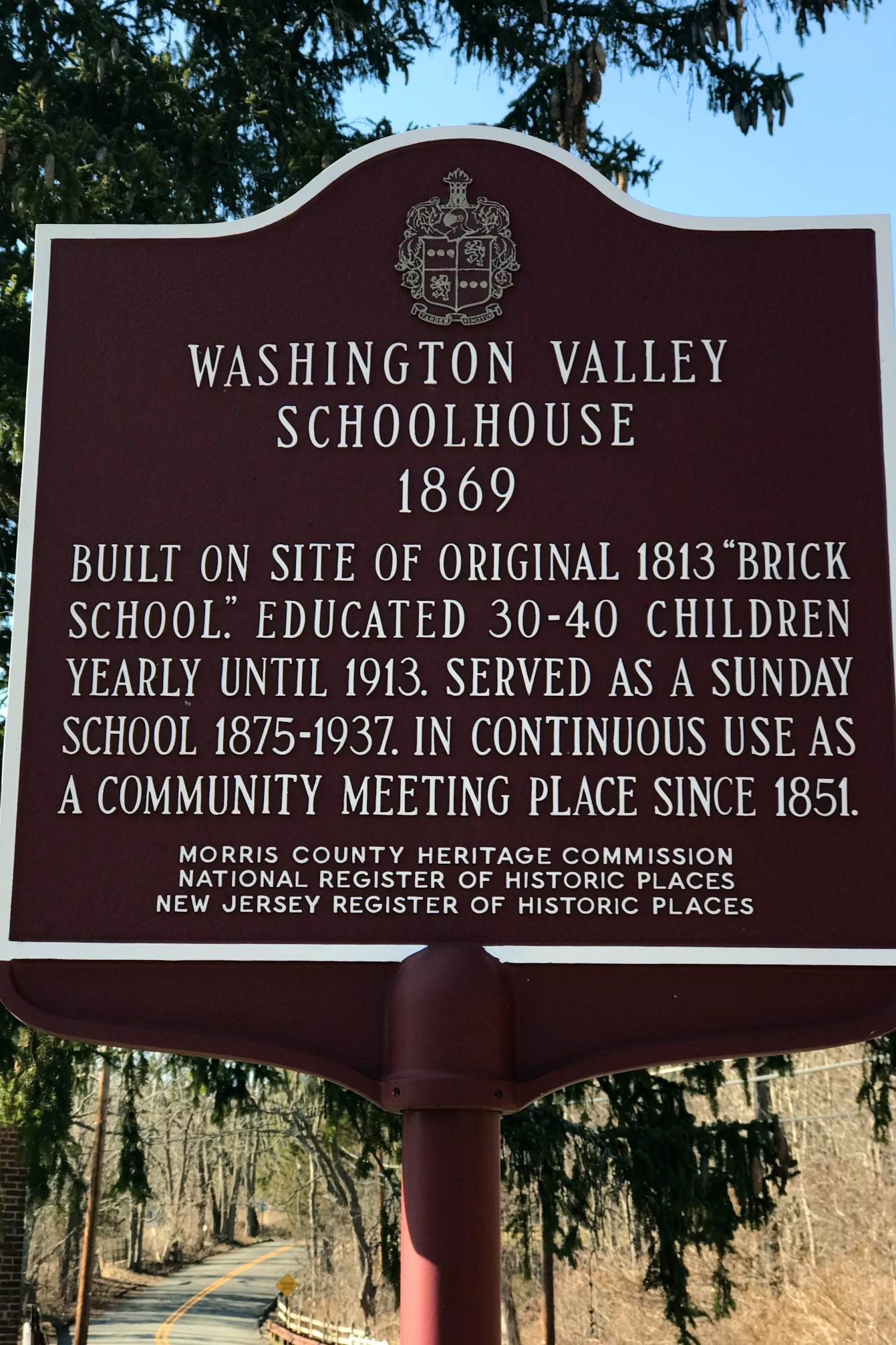
Information sign

== See also ==
- National Register of Historic Places listings in Morris County, New Jersey
