= Morristown, New Jersey =

Town in Morris County, New Jersey, US

- Town
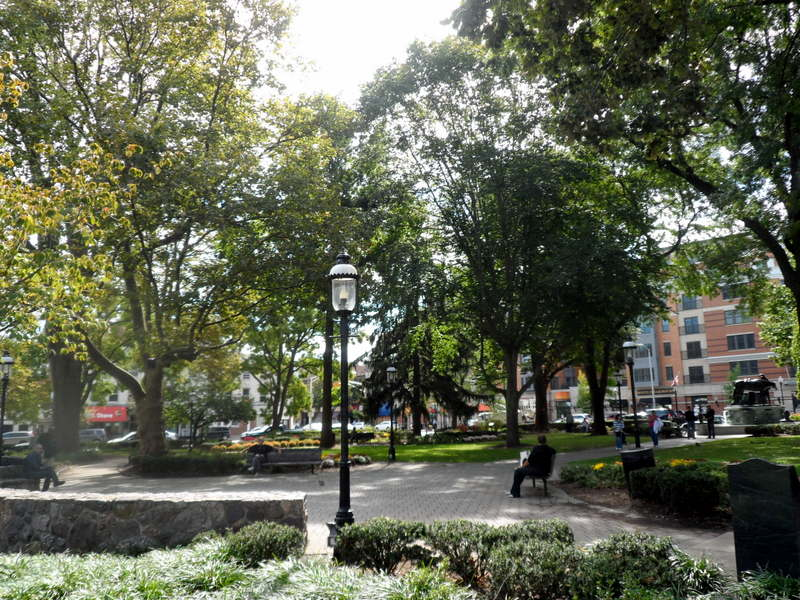
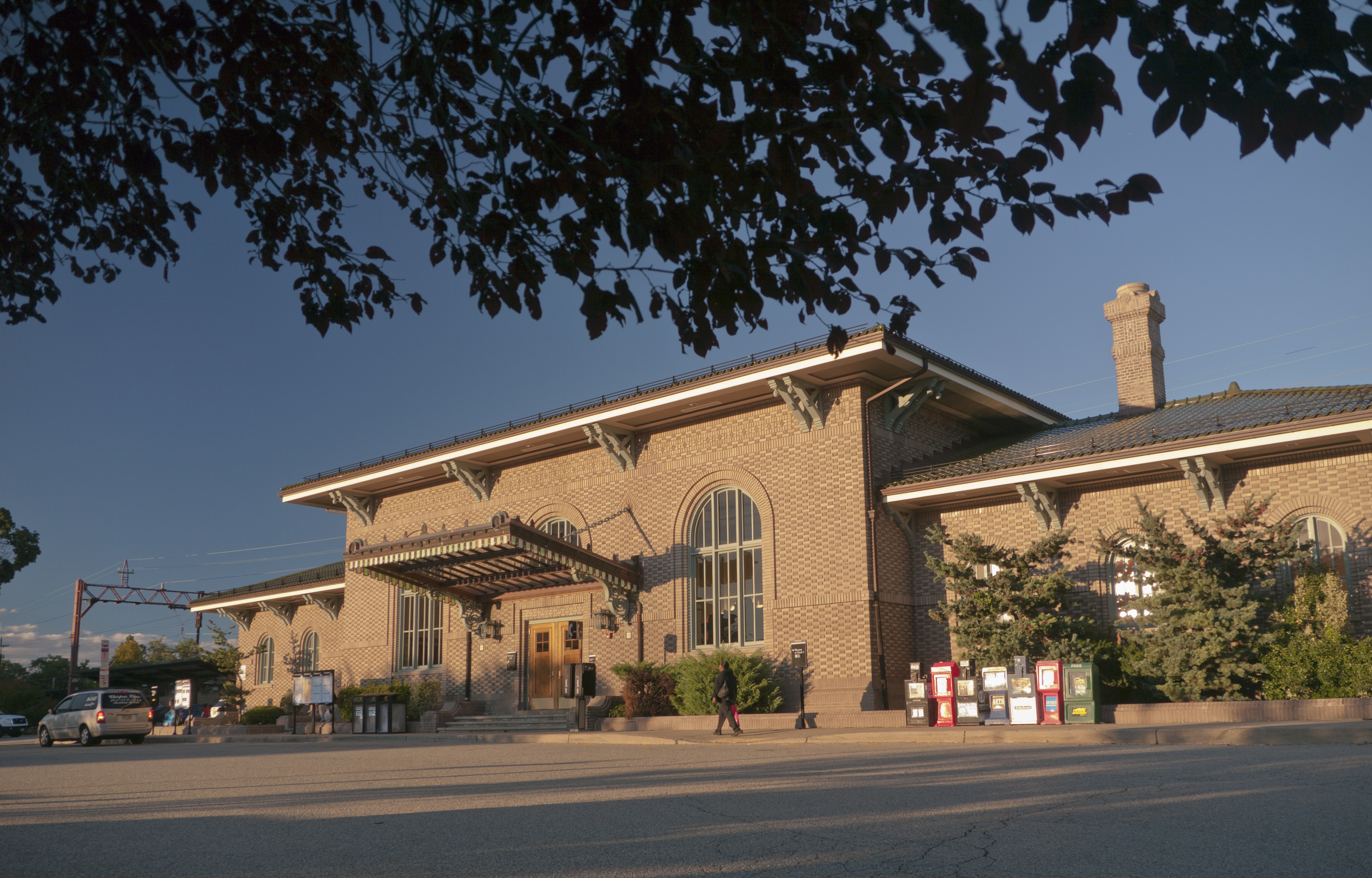
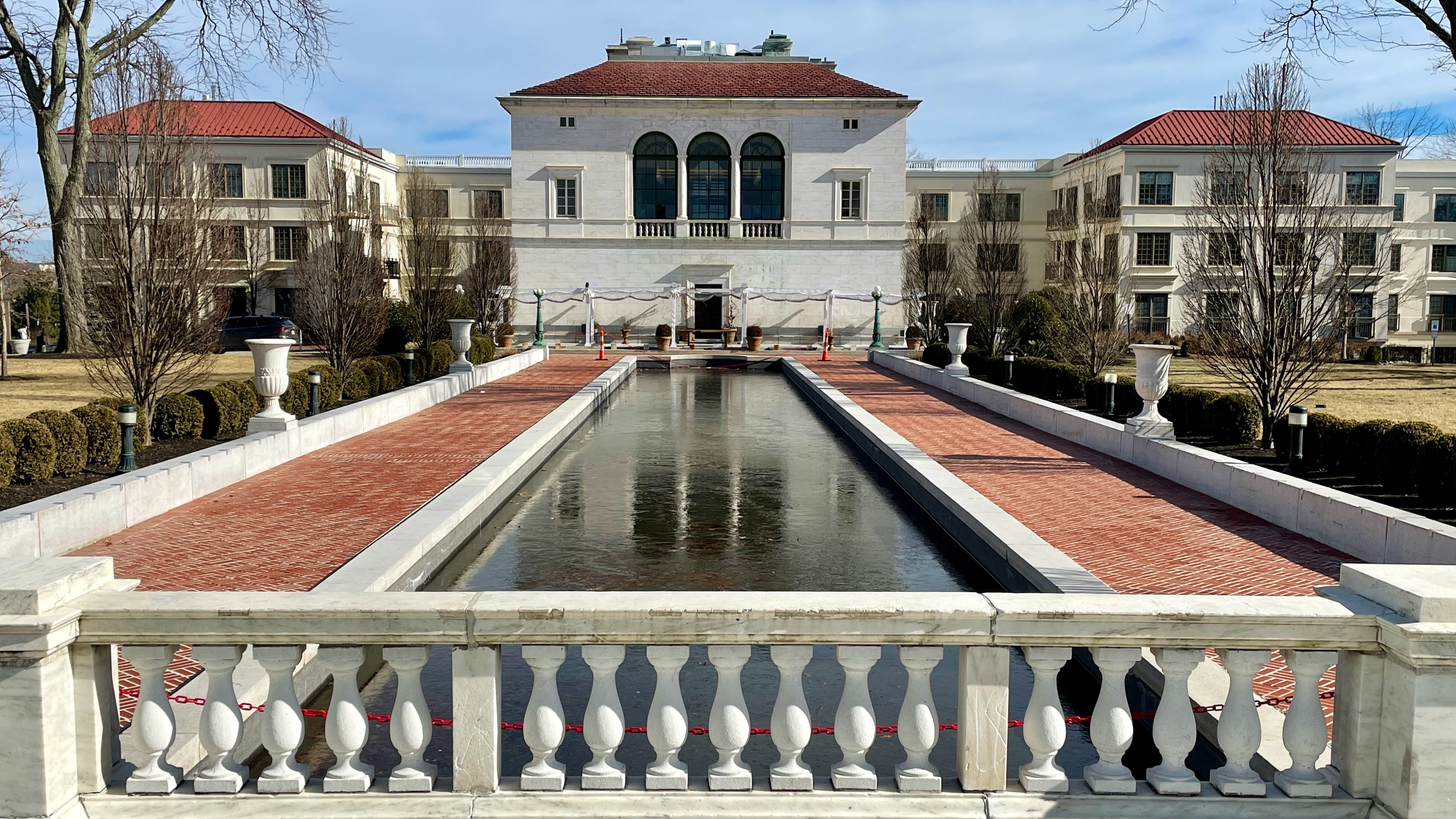
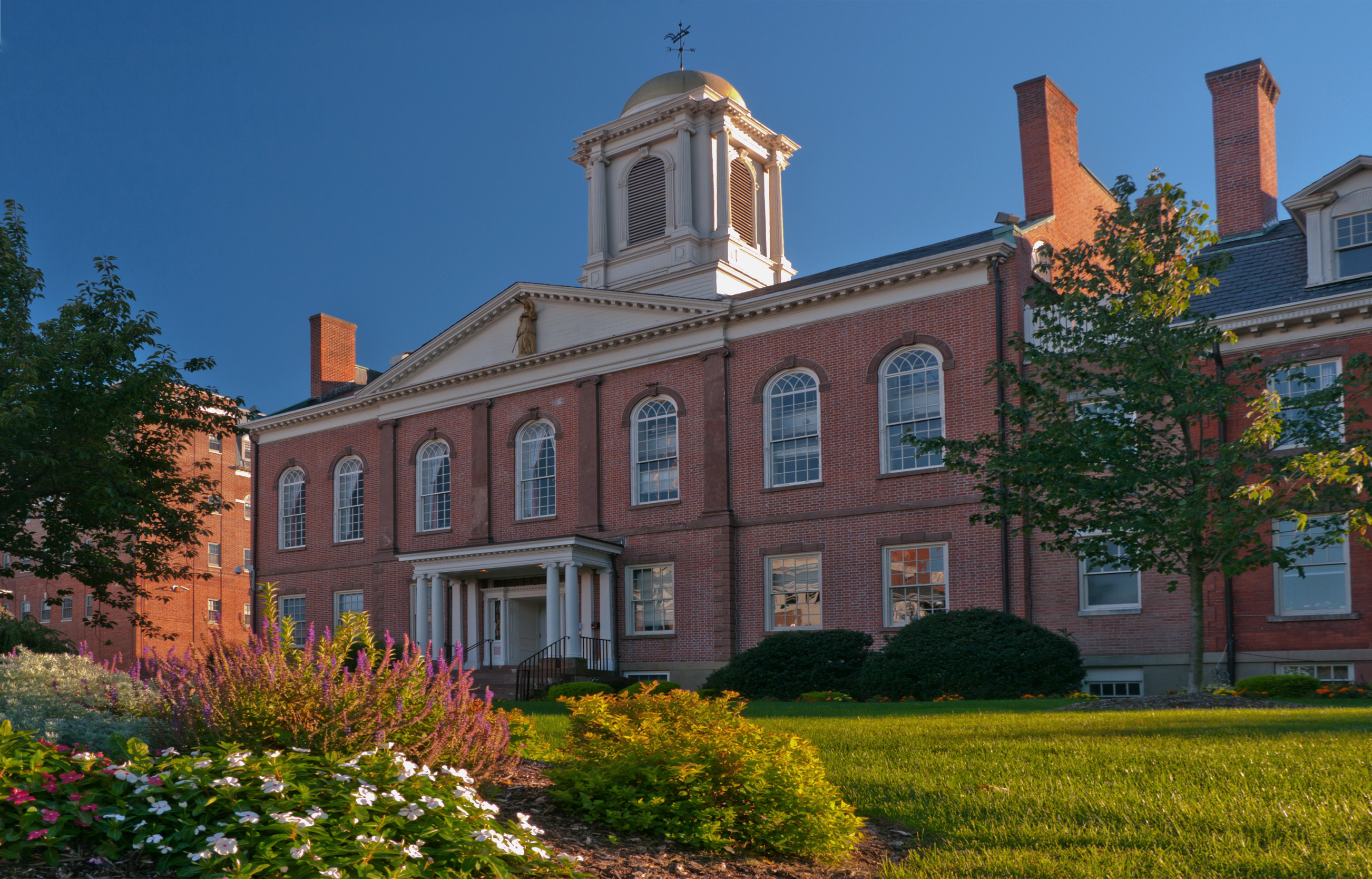
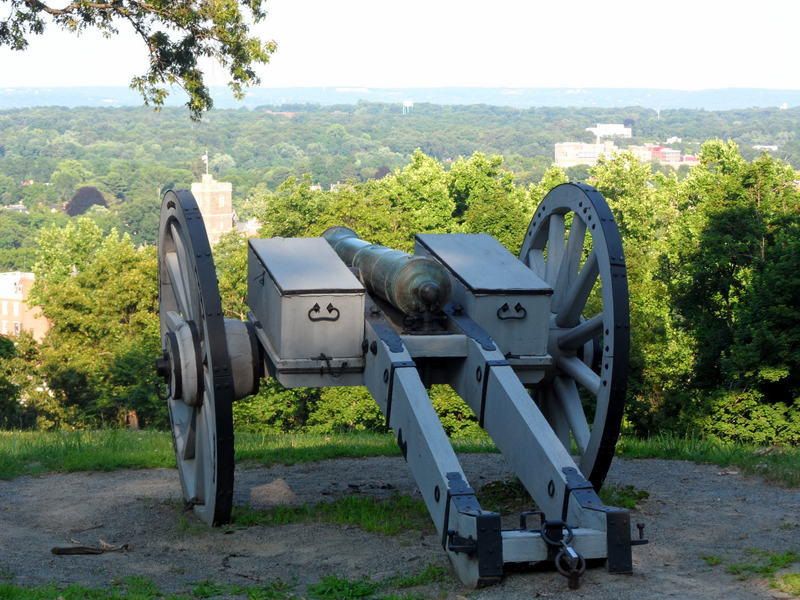
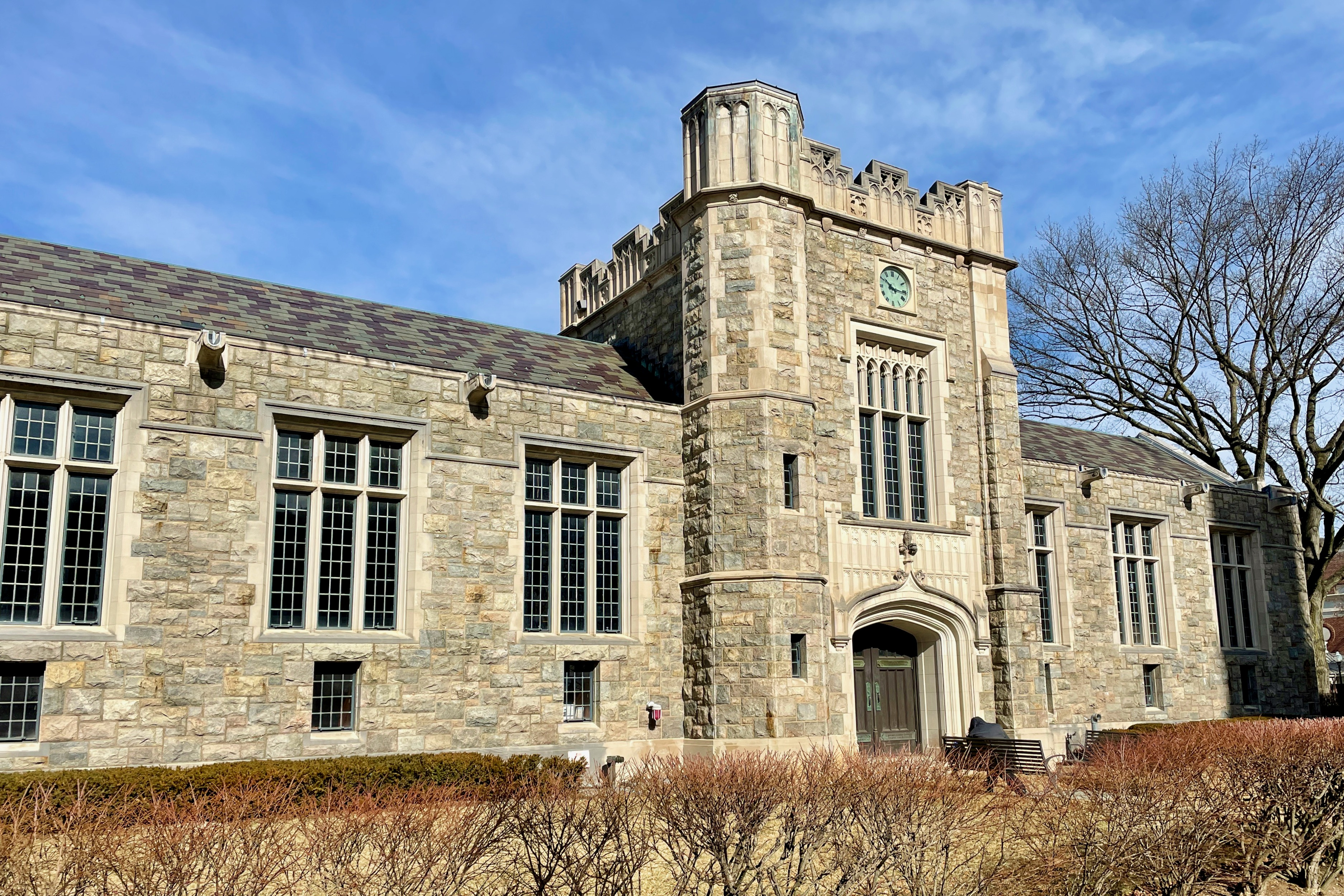
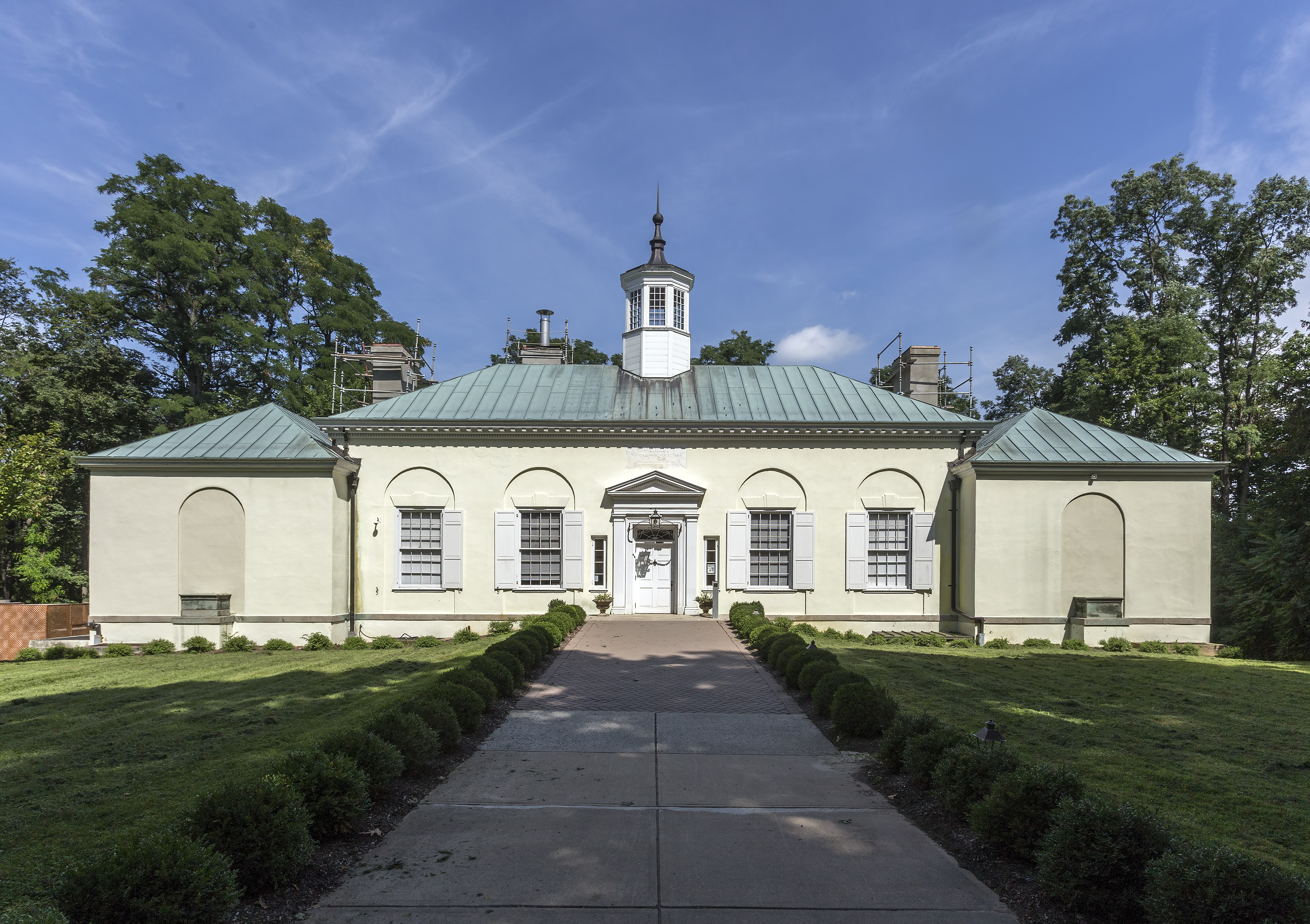
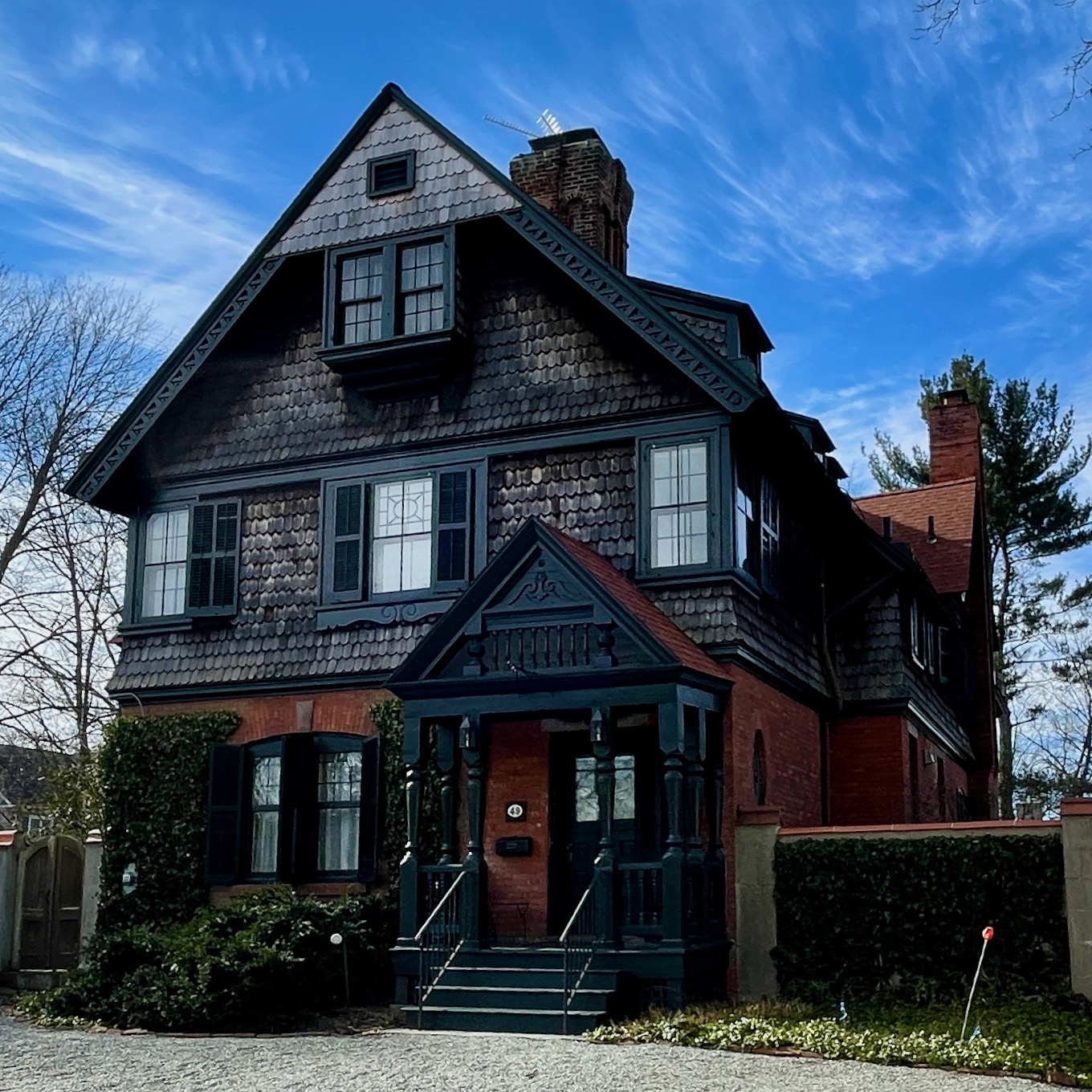
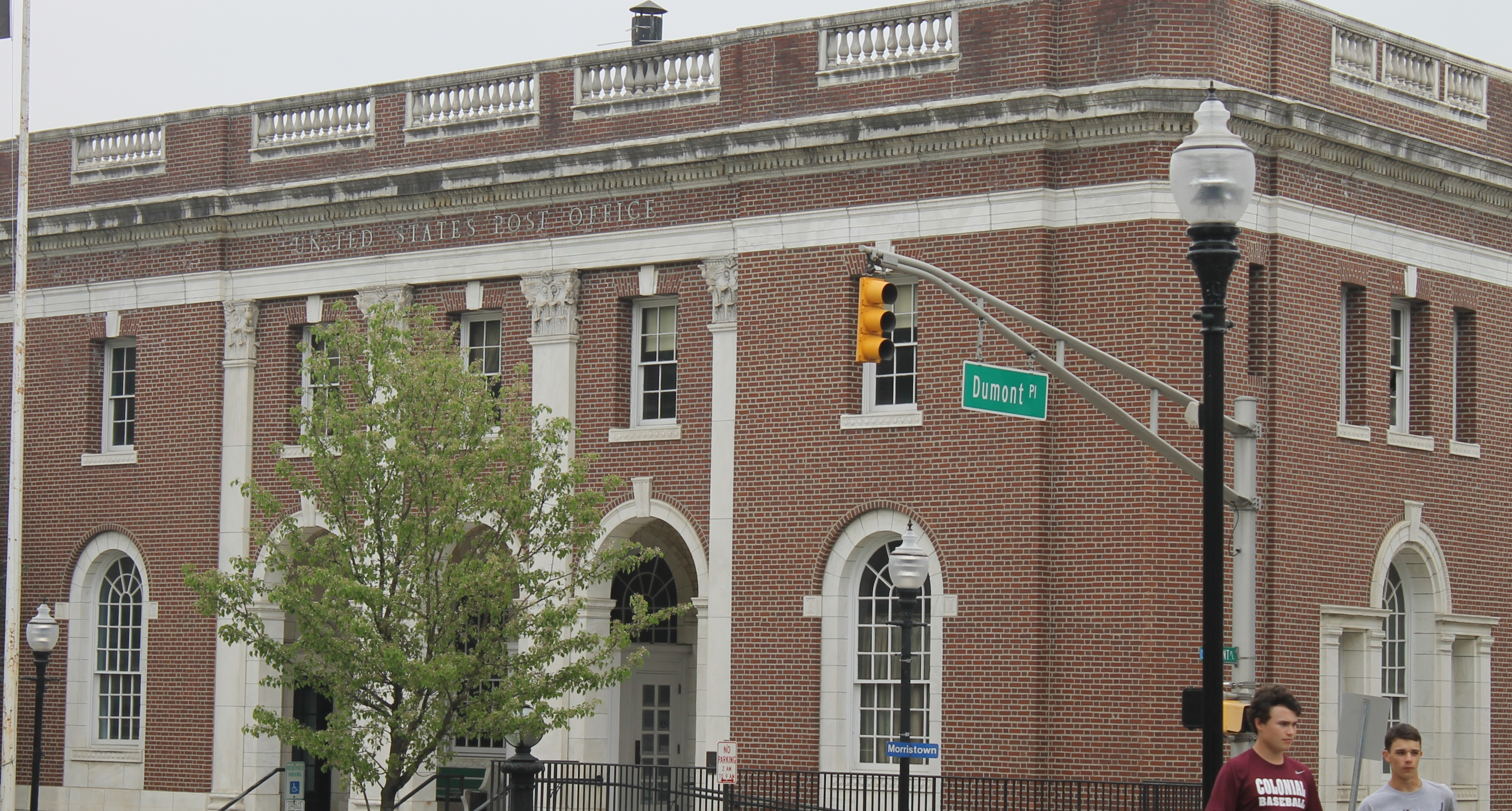
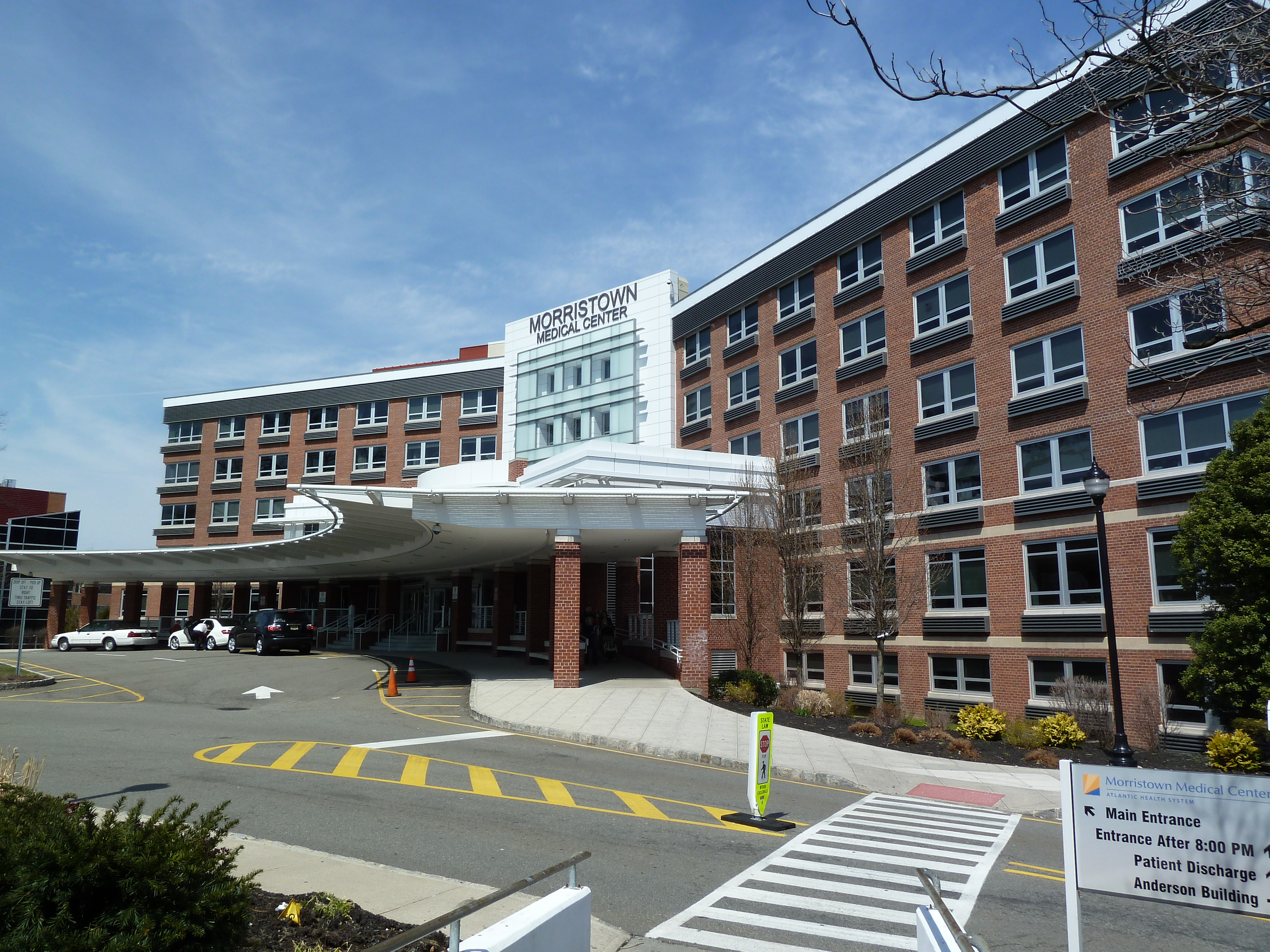
- Morristown Green, the cultural heart of Morristown Morristown Station The Vail Mansion Morris County Courthouse Fort Nonsense Morristown & Morris Township Library Washington's Headquarters Museum The Kedge U.S. Post Office Downtown Morristown Medical Center

- Flag Logo
- Nicknames: "Military Capital of the American Revolution" , "Mo Town", "The Mo", "Mo City"
- Location of Morristown in Morris County highlighted in red (right). Inset map: Location of Morris County in New Jersey highlighted in orange (left).

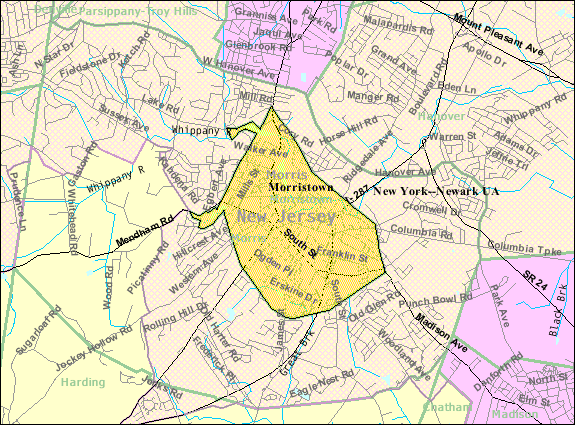
- Census Bureau map of Morristown, New Jersey
- Interactive map of Morristown, New Jersey
- Location in Morris County Location in New Jersey Location in the United States
- Coordinates: 40.796562°N 74.477318°W
- Country: United States
- State: New Jersey
- County: Morris
- Founded: 1715
- Incorporated: April 6, 1865

Government
  - Type: Faulkner Act (mayor–council)
  - Body: Town Council
  - Mayor: Timothy P. Dougherty (D, December 31, 2025)
  - Administrator: Jillian Barrick
  - Municipal clerk: Margot Kaye

Area
  - Total: 3.01 sq mi (7.79 km^{2})
  - Land: 2.91 sq mi (7.53 km^{2})
  - Water: 0.097 sq mi (0.25 km^{2}) 3.26%
  - Rank: 333rd of 565 in state 25th of 39 in county
- Elevation: 315 ft (96 m)

Population (2020)
  - Total: 20,180
  - Estimate (2024): 20,723
  - Rank: 137th of 565 in state 9th of 39 in county
  - Density: 6,937.1/sq mi (2,678.4/km^{2})
  - Rank: 67th of 565 in state 2nd of 39 in county
- Time zone: UTC−05:00 (Eastern (EST))
  - Summer (DST): UTC−04:00 (Eastern (EDT))
- ZIP Codes: 07960–07963
- Area codes: 862/973 and 201
- FIPS code: 3402748300
- GNIS feature ID: 0885309
- Website: www.townofmorristown.org

Morristown (/ˈmɒrɪstaʊn/) is a town in and the county seat of Morris County, in the U.S. state of New Jersey. Morristown has been called "the military capital of the American Revolution" because of its strategic role in the war for independence from Great Britain. Morristown's history is visible in a variety of locations that collectively make up Morristown National Historical Park, the country's first National Historical Park.

Morristown was incorporated as a town by an act of the New Jersey Legislature on April 6, 1865, within Morris Township, and it was formally set off from the township in 1895. As of the 2020 United States census, the town's population was 20,180, its highest decennial census count ever and an increase of 1,769 (+9.6%) from the 2010 census count of 18,411, which in turn had reflected a decline of 133 (−0.7%) from the 18,544 counted at the 2000 census.

According to British colonial records, the first permanent settlement in Morristown was New Hanover, founded in 1715 by colonists from New York and Connecticut. Morris County was created on March 15, 1739, from portions of Hunterdon County. The county, and ultimately Morristown itself, was named for the popular Governor of the Province, Lewis Morris, who championed land ownership rights for colonists.

== History ==
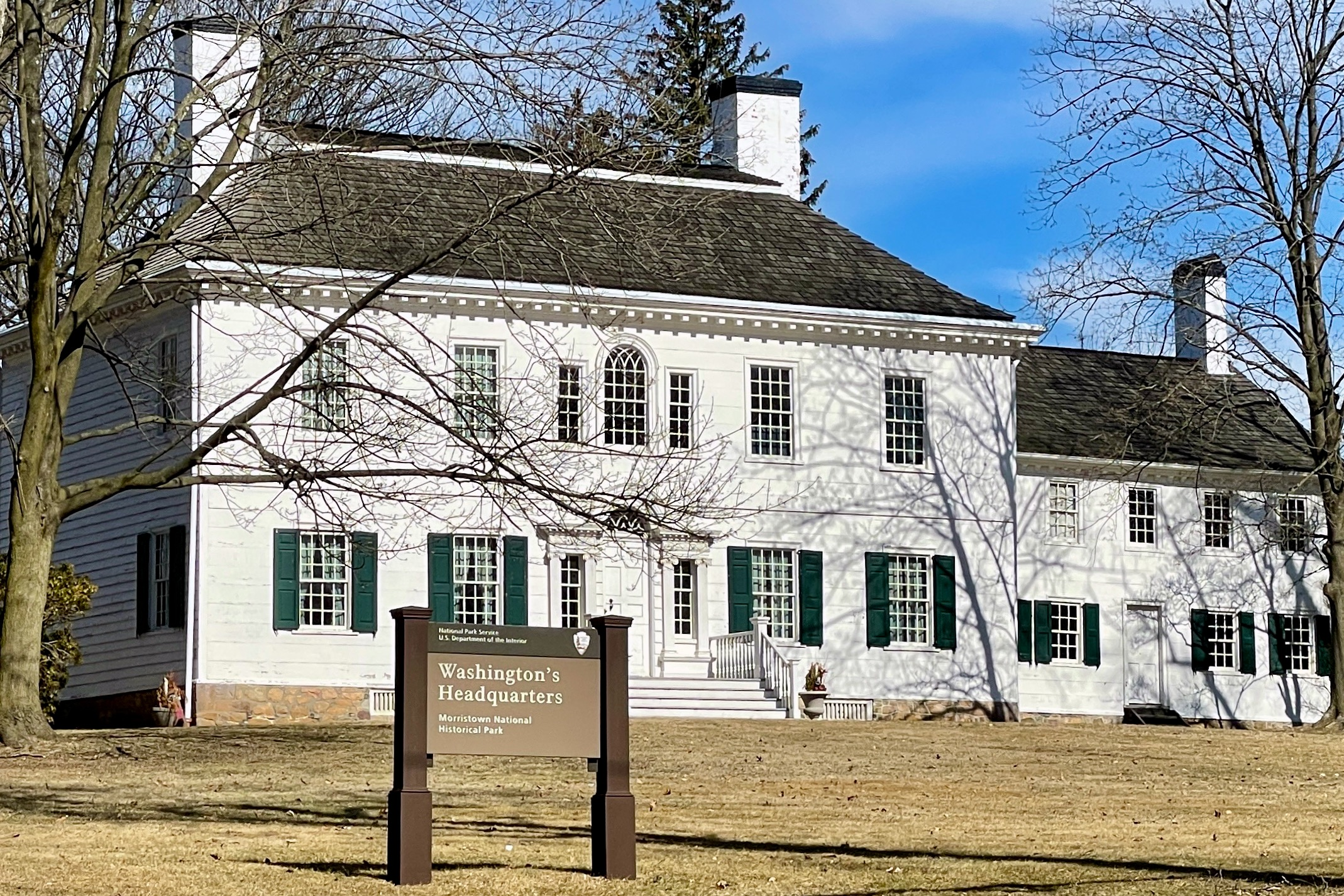
Ford Mansion, Washington's headquarters from 1779 to 1780 during the Revolutionary War

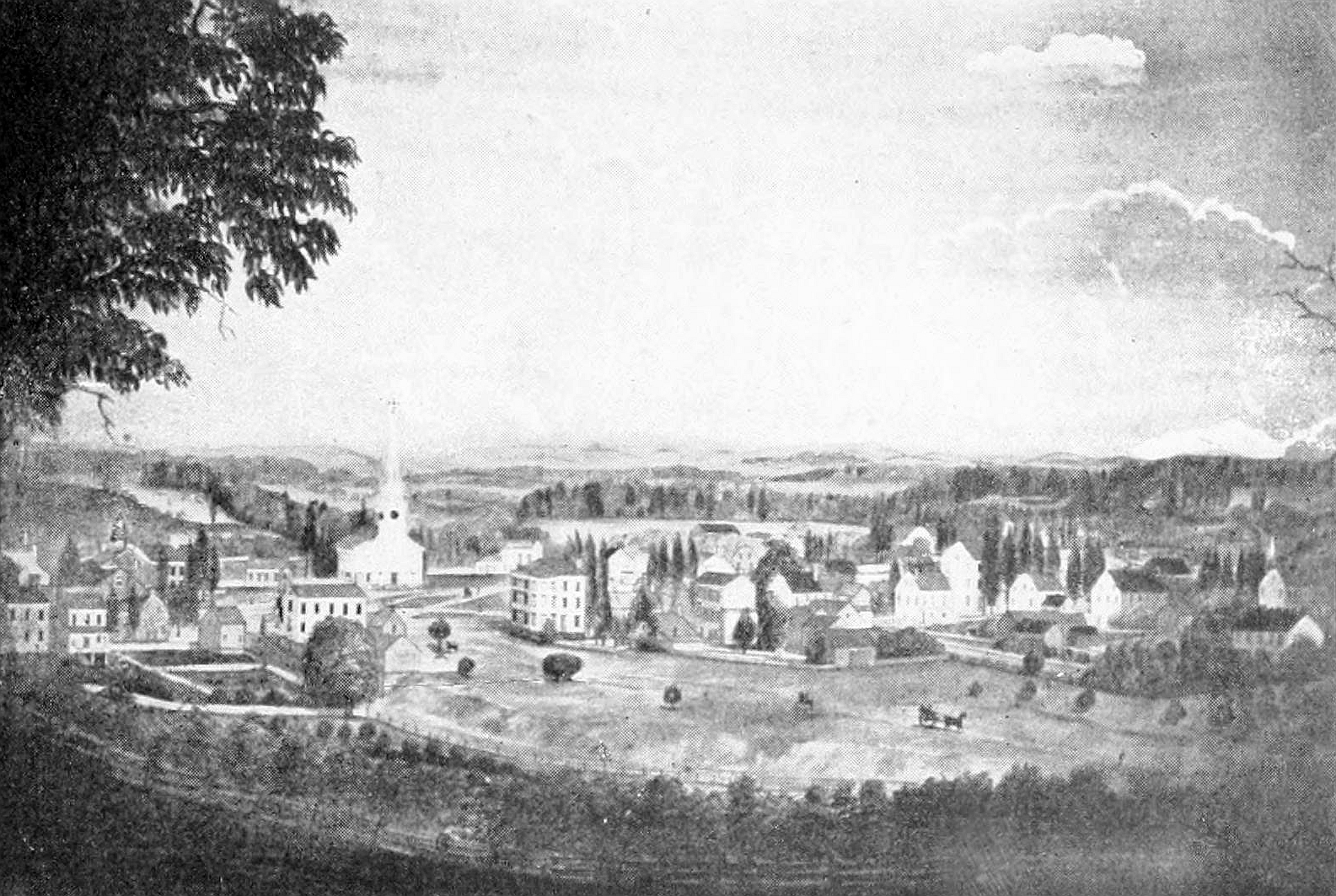
Morristown in 1828

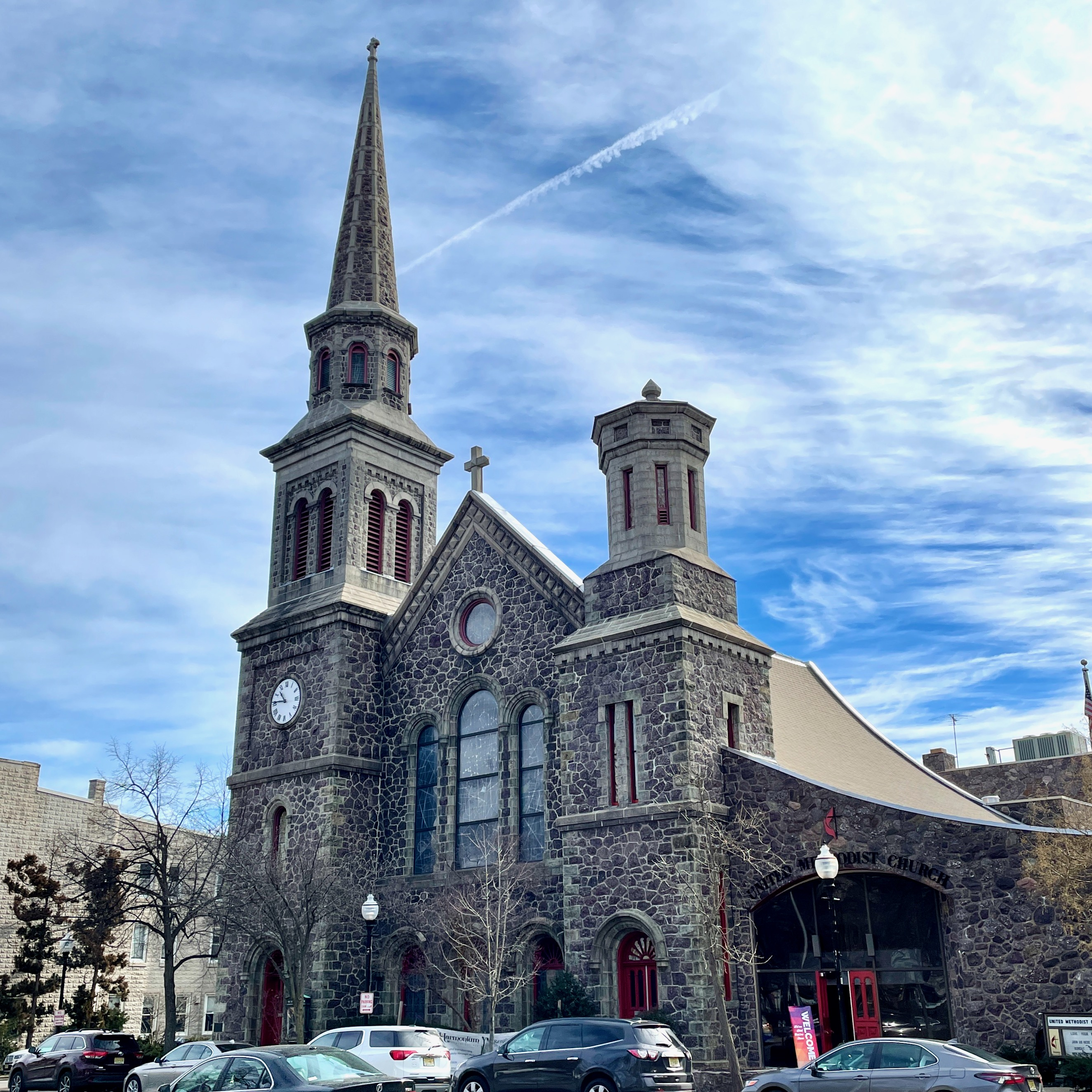
Morristown United Methodist Church

Present-day Morristown was initially inhabited by the Lenni Lenape Native Americans for up to 6,000 years prior to exploration of Europeans. The first European settlements in this portion of New Jersey were established by Sweden and the Netherlands in the early 17th century, when significant trade in furs existed between the natives and the Europeans at temporary posts. It became part New Netherland, a Dutch colony, but the English seized control of the region in 1664, which was granted to Sir George Carteret and John Berkeley, 1st Baron Berkeley of Stratton, and named the Province of New Jersey.

=== 18th century ===
Morristown was settled around 1715 by English Presbyterians from Southold, New York, on Long Island and New Haven, Connecticut, as the village of New Hanover. The town's central location and road connections led to its selection as the seat of the new Morris County shortly after its separation from Hunterdon County on March 15, 1739. The village and county were named for Lewis Morris, the first and then sitting royal governor of a united colony of New Jersey.

By the middle of the 18th century, Morristown had 250 residents, with two churches, a courthouse, two taverns, two schools, several stores and numerous mills and farms nearby.

George Washington first came to Morristown in May 1773, two years before the Revolutionary War broke out, and traveled from there to New York City with John Parke Custis, his stepson, and Lord Stirling.

In 1777, General Washington and the Continental Army marched from the victories at Trenton and Princeton to encamp near Morristown from January to May. Washington's headquarters during that first encampment was at Jacob Arnold's Tavern, located at the Morristown Green in the center of Morristown. Morristown was selected for its extremely strategic location. It was between Philadelphia and New York and near New England while being protected by the Watchung Mountains from the bulk of British troops camped in New York City. It also was chosen for the skills and trades of the residents, local industries and natural resources to provide arms, and what was thought to be the ability of the community to provide enough food to support the army.

The churches were used for inoculations for smallpox. That first headquarters, Arnold's Tavern, was eventually moved .5 miles (800 m) south of the green onto Mount Kemble Avenue to become All Souls' Hospital in the late 19th century. It suffered a fire in 1918, and the original structure was demolished, but new buildings for the hospital were built directly across the street.

From December 1779 to June 1780, the Continental Army's second encampment at Morristown was at Jockey Hollow. Then, Washington's headquarters in Morristown was located at the Ford Mansion, a large mansion near what was then the edge of town. Ford's widow and children shared the house with Martha Washington and officers of the Continental Army.

The winter of 1780 was the worst winter of the Revolutionary War. The starvation was complicated by extreme inflation of money and lack of pay for the army. The entire Pennsylvania contingent successfully mutinied. Later, 200 New Jersey soldiers also attempted unsuccessfully to mutiny. Many soldiers died, due to weak health.

During Washington's second stay, in March 1780, he declared St. Patrick's Day a holiday to honor his many Irish troops. Martha Washington traveled from Virginia and remained with her husband each winter throughout the war. The Marquis de Lafayette came to Washington in Morristown to inform him that France would be sending ships and trained soldiers to aid the Continental Army.

Ford Mansion, Jockey Hollow, and Fort Nonsense are all preserved as part of Morristown National Historical Park, managed by the National Park Service, which has the distinction among historic preservationists of being the first National Historical Park established in the United States.

During Washington's stay, Benedict Arnold was court-martialed at Dickerson's Tavern, on Spring Street, for charges related to profiteering from military supplies at Philadelphia. His admonishment was made public, but Washington quietly promised the hero, Arnold, to make it up to him.

Alexander Hamilton courted and wed Elizabeth Schuyler at a residence where Washington's personal physician resided. Locally known as the Schuyler-Hamilton House, the Dr. Jabez Campfield House is listed on both the New Jersey and National Register of Historic Places.

At Morristown Green, there is a statue commemorating the meeting of George Washington, the young Marquis de LaFayette, and young Alexander Hamilton as they discussed forthcoming aid from French ships and troops being sent by King Louis XVI to aid the Continental Army in the Revolutionary War.

Morristown's Burnham Park has a statue, "Father of the American Revolution", depicting Thomas Paine, who wrote Common Sense in 1776, which urged a complete break from British rule and helped inspire the American Revolution. The bronze statue by sculptor Georg J. Lober shows Paine in 1776 using a drum as a table during the withdrawal of the army across New Jersey composing Crisis 1. He wrote, "These are the times that try men's souls..." The statue was dedicated on July 4, 1950.

=== 19th century ===
The idea for constructing the Morris Canal is credited to Morristown businessman George P. Macculloch, who in 1822 convened a group to discuss his concept for a canal. The group included Governor of New Jersey Isaac Halstead Williamson, which led to approval of the proposal by the New Jersey Legislature later that year. The canal was used for a century. In July 1825 during his 15 month return tour of the United States, the Marquis de Lafayette returned to Morristown, where a ball was held in his honor at the 1807 Sansay House on DeHart Street (the edifice still stands as of 2011).

In 1827, St. Peter's Episcopal Church was founded at the behest of Bishop George Washington Doane and many prominent Morristown Families, including George P. Macculloch, of the Morris Canal. When the Church was rebuilt by the then-internationally famous architectural firm, McKim, Mead and White, beginning in 1889, the congregation erected one of the United States finest church buildings –a stone, English-gothic church complete with fined stained glass, and a long, decorated interior.

Antoine le Blanc, a French immigrant laborer, murdered the Sayre family and their servant (or possibly slave), Phoebe. He was tried and convicted of murder of the Sayres (but not of Phoebe) on August 13, 1833. On September 6, 1833, Le Blanc became the last person hanged on the Morristown Green. Until late 2006, the house where the murders were committed was known as "Jimmy's Haunt," which is purported to be haunted by Phoebe's ghost because her murder never saw justice. Jimmy's Haunt was torn down to make way for a bank in 2007.

Samuel F. B. Morse and Alfred Vail built the first telegraph at the Speedwell Ironworks in Morristown on January 6, 1838. The first telegraph message was A patient waiter is no loser. The first public demonstration of the invention occurred five days later as an early step toward the Information Age.

Jacob Arnold's Tavern, the first headquarters for Washington in Morristown and site of Benedict Arnold's 1780 trial, was purchased by Morristown historian Julia Keese Nelson Colles (1840-1913) to save it from demolition in 1886. It was moved by horse-power in the winter of 1887 from "the green" (after being stuck on Bank Street for about six weeks) to a site 0.5 miles (0.80 km) south on Mount Kemble Avenue at what is now a parking lot for the Atlantic RIMM Rehabilitation Hospital. It became a boarding house for four years until it was converted by the Grey Nuns from Montreal into All Souls' Hospital, the first general hospital in Morris County. George and Martha Washington's second floor ballroom became a chapel and the first floor tavern became a ward for patients. In 1910, the late Augustus Lefebvre Revere (brother of hospital founder Paul Revere) willed the Hospital $10,000 to be used for the erection of a new building. This fund was used 8 years later when the original Arnold's Tavern building was lost to a fire. The entire organization, nurses, doctors, and patients of All Souls' Hospital were then moved across Mount Kemble Avenue, U.S. Route 202, to the newly built brick hospital building. All Souls' was set to close because of financial difficulties in the late 1960s. In 1973, it became Community Medical Center. In 1977, the center became bankrupt and was purchased by the then new and larger Morristown Memorial Hospital, which is now the Morristown Medical Center.

On December 18, 1843, the Bethel African Methodist Episcopal Church was incorporated. This was the first congregation established by blacks in Morris County. It is still active. The first site of the Church was located at 13 Spring Street and served as the only schoolhouse for colored children until 1870. The Church relocated to its present site at 59 Spring Street in 1874.

The first Jews moved to Morristown in the 1850s, but much larger numbers of Ashkenazi Jews migrated to the region from Eastern Europe in the 1890s, which led to the incorporation of the Morristown Jewish Center in 1899. Today there are several Jewish synagogues in Morristown reflecting the diversity of the community.

In the 1880s, the town's residents were primarily farmers. The small number of stores in the Morristown Green town center were only open during the evening to accommodate farmers who did not leave their work during the daytime. There were only a few stores in town, including Adams & Fairchild grocers and P. H. Hoffman & Son clothiers, both located in the Arnold's Tavern on the Morristown Green.

=== Gilded Age of Morristown ===
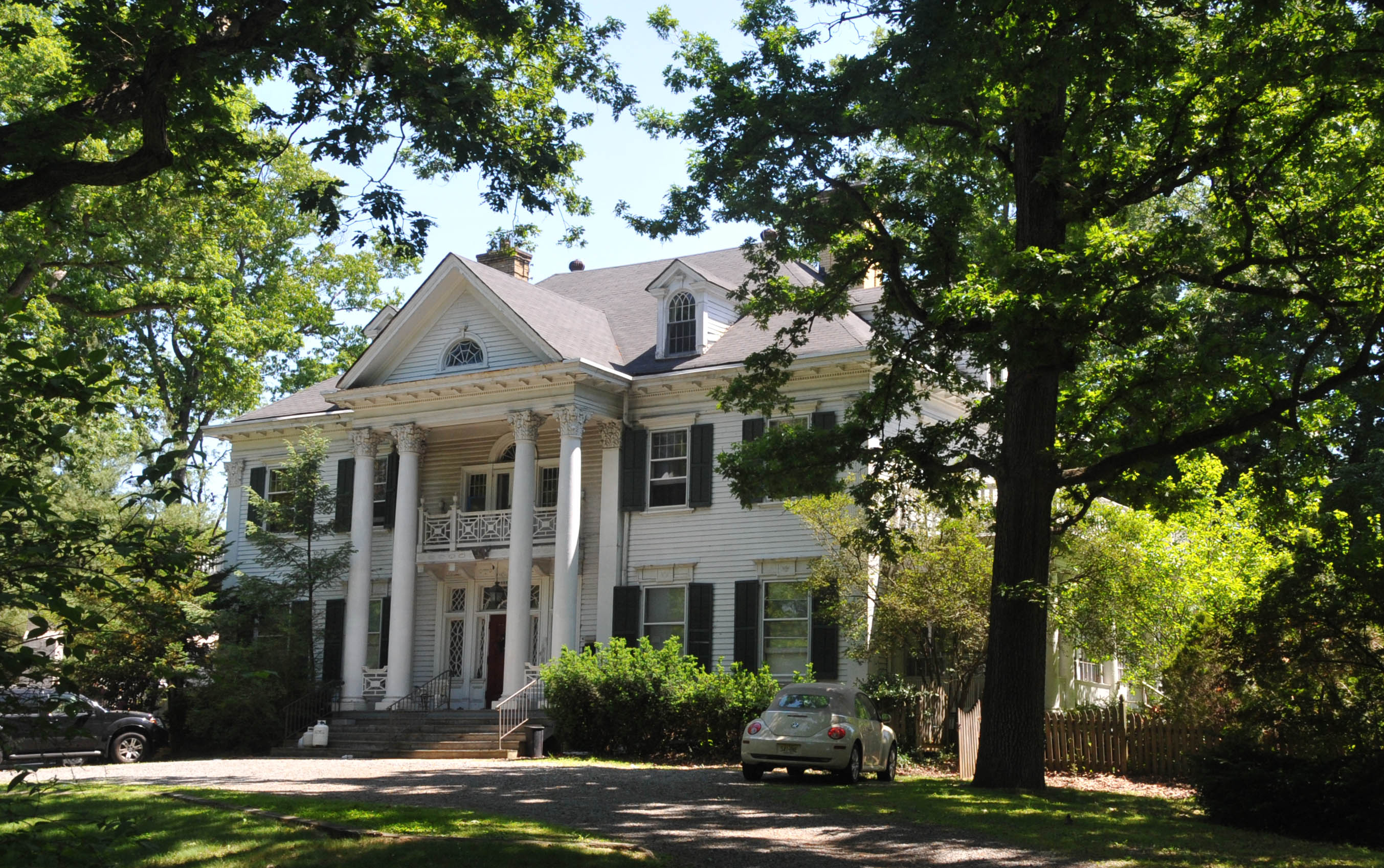
Oak Dell in Morristown

Starting in the mid-1800s, Morristown became a popular summer retreat for some of New York City's wealthiest residents. From the 1870s onwards, immense estates were built up along once rural thoroughfares; Madison Avenue, which runs along Morristown and Madison, New Jersey, became known as "the street of the 100 millionaires" due to the sheer extravagance of the houses that were constructed.

Between 1880 and 1929, the Gilded Age of Morristown occurred, when dozens of "millionaires with large fortunes built their estates" in Morristown and Morris Township.

In the 1880 United States census, the town had 5,418 residents, which grew to 8,156 in 1890.

In 1889, Christian charity organization Market Street Mission was established on 9 Market Street beside the Morristown Green in response to the large number of saloons on Market Street. Beginning on March 18, 1889, the Mission hosted nightly meetings to aid and convert those with alcoholism, opioid use, and homelessness. As of 2022, the organization continues to operate a homeless shelter, meals, and emergency services, along with men's drug addiction recovery groups, community counseling, a chapel, and a thrift store.

Morris Township describes the influx of millionaires to the area:

By 1896, an estimated 54 millionaires lived in the Morristown area, with a total wealth of $289,000,000, which [circa 2009] would be worth billions of dollars. Six years later in 1902, there were at least 91 millionaires. Morristown became the home of men and women whose concentrated wealth totaled nearly $300,000,000 at the turn of the century.

This included New York warehouse and grain broker Charles Grant Foster, who bought the farm estate and mansion of Union Army general Joseph Warren Revere in 1881. This became Fosterfields, a Jersey cow farm. It was later managed by Caroline Rose Foster, though most of its herd was sold in a 1927 auction. In 1979 it was donated to the Morris County Park Commission. The site currently houses a living history museum and Revere's historic house.

In 1902, the New York Herald described Morristown as "the Millionaire City of the Nation." The Herald claimed it "contains the richest and least known colony of wealthy people in the world." It identified 45 millionaires (15 of whom were worth over $10 million) who had purchased country homes in Morristown to avoid "lavish display" and seek "freedom from notoriety." The newspaper named some of them including lawyer George Griswold Frelinghuysen, carpet-making heir Eugene Higgins, banker Otto Hermann Kahn, Luther Kountze, and Louis A. Thebaud.

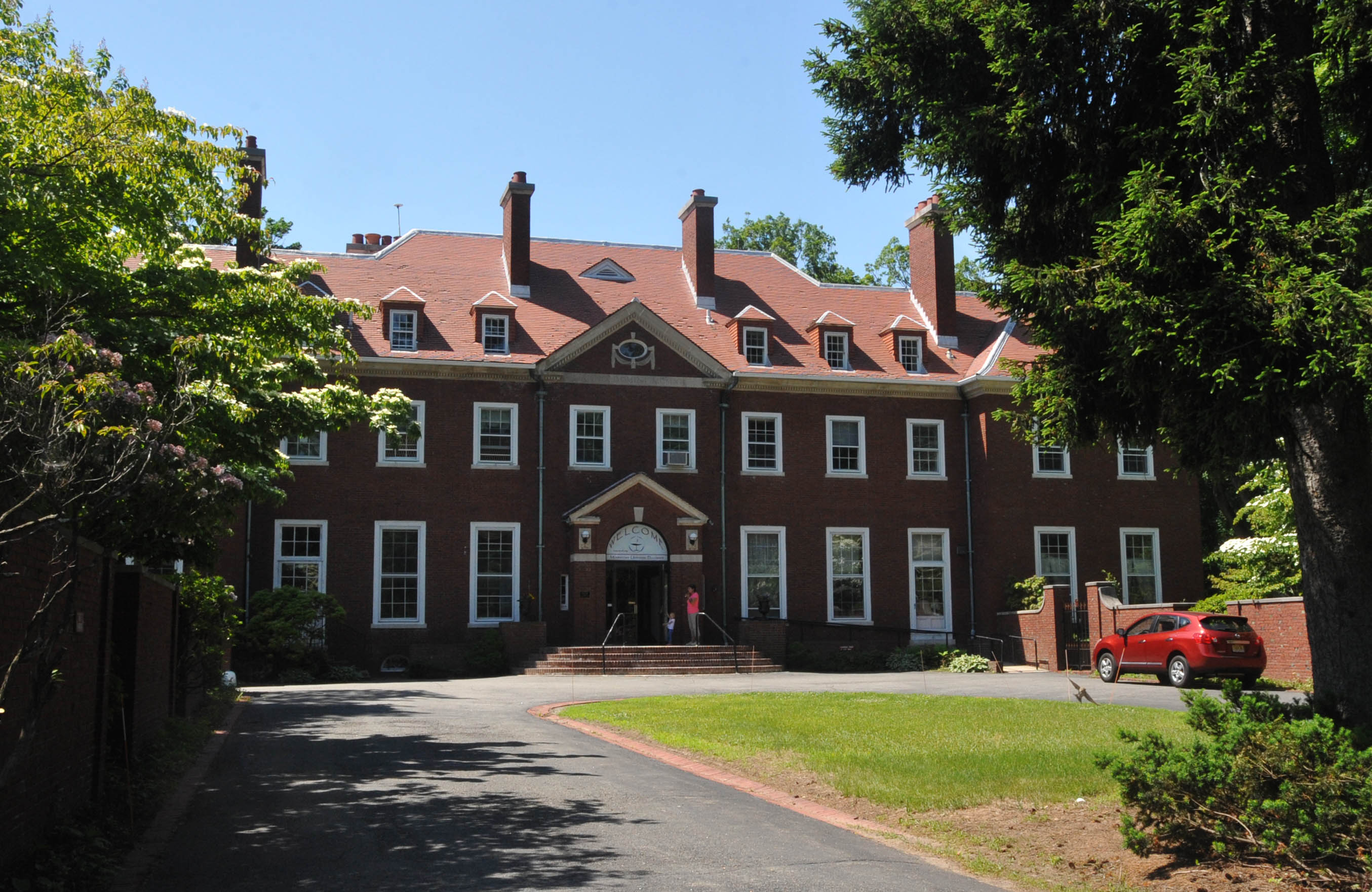
Thorne Mansion, built in 1912, houses the Morristown Unitarian Universalist Fellowship

Even smaller estates without deer herds, polo fields or private gas plants necessitated "multiple indoor and outdoor employees" such as "butlers, housekeeprs, parlor-maids and upstairs maids; governesses, nannies, and tutors; cooks and kitchen maids, coachmen, grooms, and stable boys; managers, care-takers, watchmen; gardeners and assistants."

The Gilded Age of Morristown ended in 1929, due to the "high cost of maintaining the estates, increasing income taxes, and the stock market crash" that led to the Great Depression. The Morris Township reports, "Many of the mansions were closed or sold, and some burned."

Amy Curry, executive director of the Morris County Historical Society says: “Today, many of these industrial tycoons established or donated to nonprofit causes - some dedicated their estates to create colleges or parks, while others preserved large tracts of open space. In southeastern Morris County, reminders of this fascinating history are all around us.”

=== 20th century ===
Since 1929, more than 16,000 guide dogs for the blind from The Seeing Eye, Inc., the oldest such school in the U.S., have been trained on the streets of Morristown.

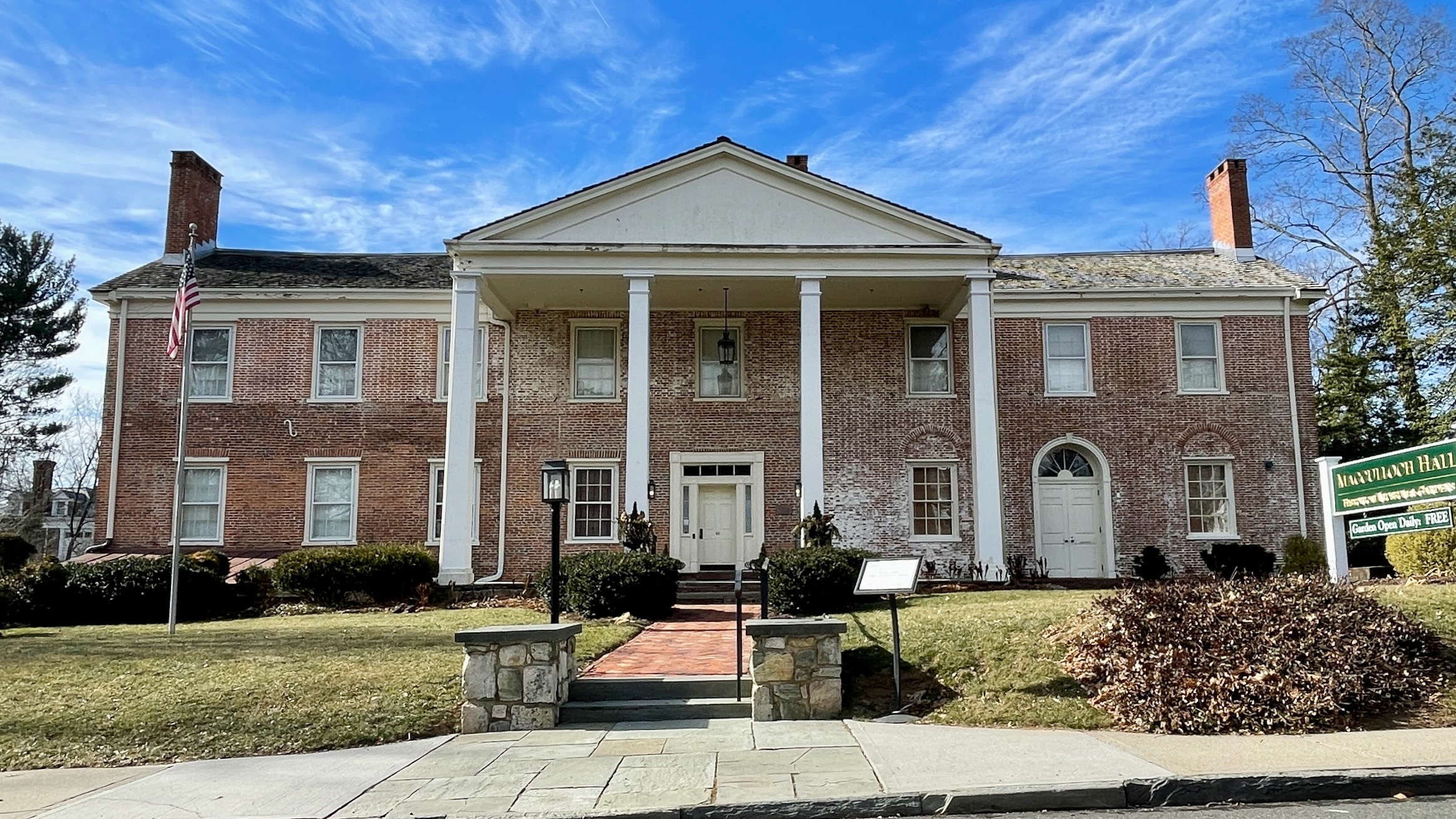
Macculloch Hall, built 1810 by George P. Macculloch

=== 21st century ===
On January 5, 2009, five red lights were spotted in the Morristown area night skies, who gained significant press coverage and 9-1-1 calls. On April 1, 2009, the perpetrators revealed their hoax by publicizing footage of its creation, which consisted of helium balloons and flares. The event became nationally known as the Morristown UFO hoax.

== Geography ==
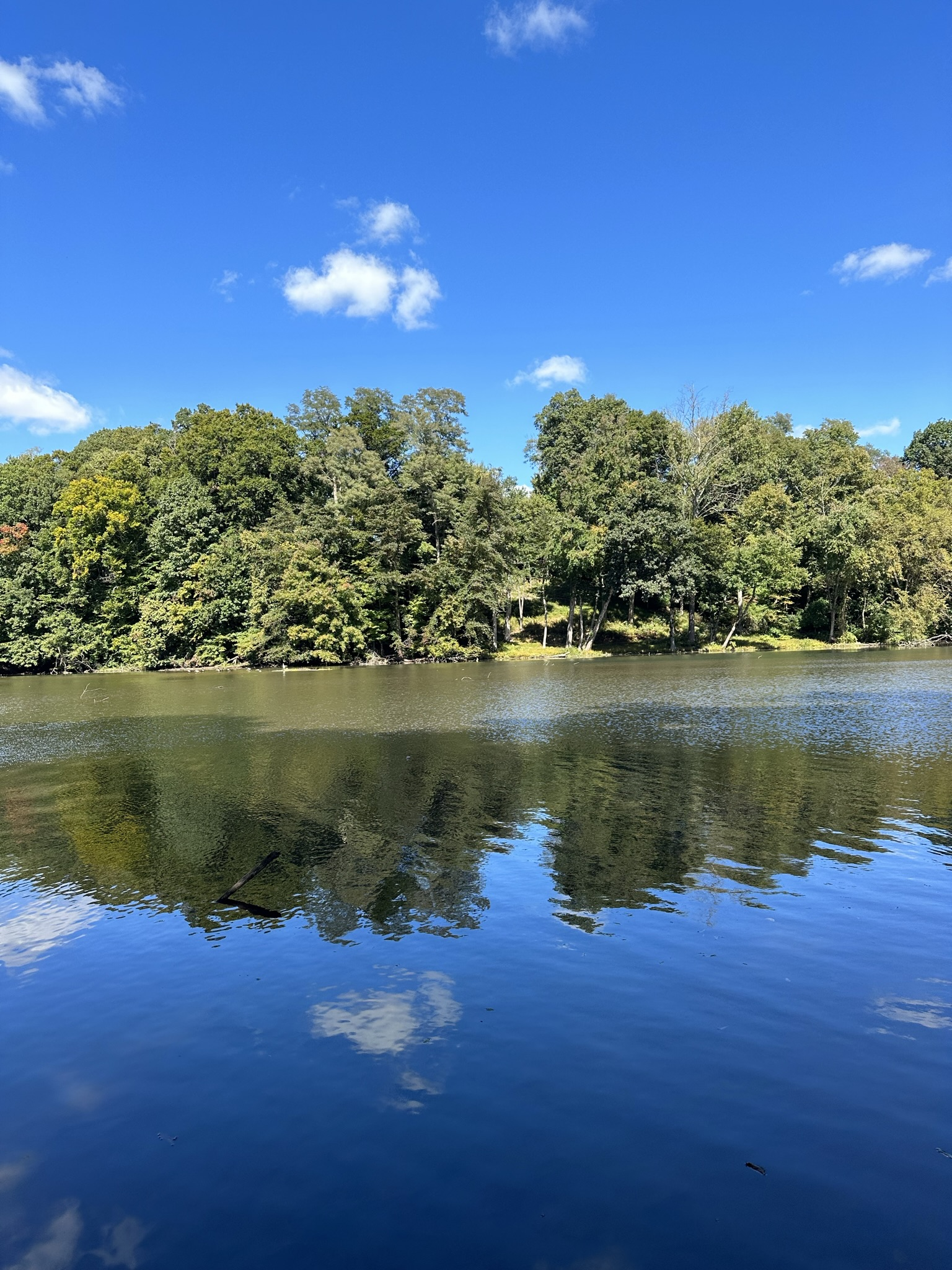
Speedwell Lake

According to the United States Census Bureau, Morristown town had a total area of 3.01 square miles (7.79 km^{2}), including 2.91 square miles (7.53 km^{2}) of land and 0.10 square miles (0.25 km^{2}) of water (3.26%).

Morristown is completely surrounded by Morris Township, making it part of 21 pairs of "doughnut towns" in the state, where one municipality entirely surrounds another.

The downtown shopping and business district of Morristown is centered around a square park, known as the Morristown Green. It is a former market square from Morristown's colonial days.

=== Climate ===
Morristown has a humid continental climate (Köppen climate classification Dfa) with hot, humid summers and moderately cold winters. The hardiness zone is 7a.

Climate data for Morristown
Month	Jan	Feb	Mar	Apr	May	Jun	Jul	Aug	Sep	Oct	Nov	Dec	Year
Mean daily maximum °F (°C)	38 (3)	40 (4)	50 (10)	61 (16)	71 (22)	80 (27)	85 (29)	83 (28)	75 (24)	65 (18)	54 (12)	43 (6)	62 (17)
Mean daily minimum °F (°C)	20 (−7)	22 (−6)	27 (−3)	36 (2)	46 (8)	58 (14)	63 (17)	62 (17)	51 (11)	39 (4)	32 (0)	26 (−3)	40 (5)
Average precipitation inches (mm)	4.50 (114)	3.00 (76)	4.41 (112)	4.64 (118)	5.09 (129)	4.40 (112)	5.29 (134)	4.37 (111)	5.33 (135)	4.17 (106)	4.37 (111)	4.10 (104)	53.67 (1,363)

== Demographics ==
Historical population
Census	Pop.	Note	%±
1880	5,418		—
1890	8,156		50.5%
1900	11,267		38.1%
1910	12,507		11.0%
1920	12,548		0.3%
1930	15,197		21.1%
1940	15,270		0.5%
1950	17,124		12.1%
1960	17,712		3.4%
1970	17,662		−0.3%
1980	16,614		−5.9%
1990	16,189		−2.6%
2000	18,544		14.5%
2010	18,411		−0.7%
2020	20,180		9.6%
2024 (est.)	20,732	▲	2.7%
Population sources: 1880-1920 1880-1890; 1890-1910 1880-1930; 1940–2000 2000; 2010 2020

=== 2020 census ===
As of the 2020 census, Morristown had a population of 20,180, with 8,482 households and 4,199 families. The population density was 6,934.7 per square mile (2,679.9/km^{2}).

The median age was 34.0 years. 17.4% of residents were under the age of 18 and 12.2% were 65 years of age or older. For every 100 females, there were 102.3 males, and for every 100 females age 18 and over, there were 101.9 males age 18 and over.

100.0% of residents lived in urban areas, while 0.0% lived in rural areas.

There were 9,213 housing units, of which 7.9% were vacant. The homeowner vacancy rate was 1.4% and the rental vacancy rate was 7.5%. Of the 8,482 households, 23.1% had children under the age of 18 living in them. Of all households, 29.9% were married-couple households, 27.0% were households with a male householder and no spouse or partner present, and 33.7% were households with a female householder and no spouse or partner present. About 39.1% of all households were made up of individuals, and 9.7% had someone living alone who was 65 years of age or older. The average household size was 2.2 and the average family size was 3.0.

Racial composition as of the 2020 census
Race	Number	Percent
White	9,947	49.3%
Black or African American	2,028	10.0%
American Indian and Alaska Native	345	1.7%
Asian	968	4.8%
Native Hawaiian and Other Pacific Islander	12	0.1%
Some other race	4,130	20.5%
Two or more races	2,750	13.6%
Hispanic or Latino (of any race)	7,367	36.5%

=== Income and poverty ===
The 2016–2020 5-year American Community Survey estimates show that the median household income was $111,130 (with a margin of error of +/- $13,384) and the median family income was $124,531 (+/- $26,526). Males had a median income of $61,823 (+/- $6,029) versus $55,479 (+/- $7,473) for females. The median income for those above 16 years old was $58,971 (+/- $3,850). Approximately, 7.5% of families and 8.8% of the population were below the poverty line, including 16.5% of those under the age of 18 and 13.6% of those ages 65 or over.

=== 2010 census ===
The 2010 United States census counted 18,411 people, 7,417 households, and 3,649 families in the town. The population density was 6,284.9 per square mile (2,426.6/km^{2}). There were 8,172 housing units at an average density of 2,789.6 per square mile (1,077.1/km^{2}). The racial makeup was 62.50% (11,507) White, 13.97% (2,572) Black or African American, 0.64% (117) Native American, 4.34% (799) Asian, 0.06% (11) Pacific Islander, 14.84% (2,732) from other races, and 3.66% (673) from two or more races. Hispanic or Latino of any race were 34.09% (6,277) of the population.

Of the 7,417 households, 22.7% had children under the age of 18; 31.1% were married couples living together; 12.0% had a female householder with no husband present and 50.8% were non-families. Of all households, 38.8% were made up of individuals and 9.5% had someone living alone who was 65 years of age or older. The average household size was 2.40 and the average family size was 3.13.

17.6% of the population were under the age of 18, 9.7% from 18 to 24, 38.4% from 25 to 44, 22.9% from 45 to 64, and 11.5% who were 65 years of age or older. The median age was 34.8 years. For every 100 females, the population had 104.5 males. For every 100 females ages 18 and older there were 106.1 males.

The Census Bureau's 2006–2010 American Community Survey showed that (in 2010 inflation-adjusted dollars) median household income was $64,279 (with a margin of error of +/− $5,628) and the median family income was $66,070 (+/− $3,638). Males had a median income of $51,242 (+/− $6,106) versus $44,315 (+/− $5,443) for females. The per capita income for the borough was $37,573 (+/− $2,286). About 10.2% of families and 9.5% of the population were below the poverty line, including 16.1% of those under age 18 and 8.8% of those age 65 or over.

=== 2000 census ===
As of the 2000 United States census there were 18,544 people, 7,252 households, and 3,698 families residing in the town. The population density was 6,303.9 inhabitants per square mile (2,433.9/km^{2}). There were 7,615 housing units at an average density of 2,588.7 per square mile (999.5/km^{2}). The racial makeup of the town was 67.63% White, 16.95% Black or black, 0.22% Native American, 3.77% Asian, 0.06% Pacific Islander, 8.48% from other races, and 3.36% from two or more races. Hispanic or Latino people of any race were 27.15% of the population.

9.8% of Morristown residents identified themselves as being of Colombian American ancestry in the 2000 Census, the eighth- highest percentage of the population of any municipality in the United States. 4.5% of Morristown residents identified themselves as being of Honduran American ancestry in the 2000 Census, the sixth-highest percentage of the population of any municipality in the United States.

There were 7,252 households, out of which 22.5% had children under the age of 18 living with them, 34.4% were married couples living together, 12.0% had a female householder with no husband present, and 49.0% were non-families. 38.7% of all households were made up of individuals, and 10.2% had someone living alone who was 65 years of age or older. The average household size was 2.43 and the average family size was 3.19.

In the town, the population was spread out, with 18.4% under the age of 18, 8.8% from 18 to 24, 40.4% from 25 to 44, 20.0% from 45 to 64, and 12.4% who were 65 years of age or older. The median age was 35 years. For every 100 females, there were 100.6 males. For every 100 females age 18 and over, there were 99.7 males.

The median income for a household in the town was $57,563, and the median income for a family was $66,419. Males had a median income of $42,363 versus $37,045 for females. The per capita income for the town was $30,086. About 7.1% of families and 11.5% of the population were below the poverty line, including 11.5% of those under age 18 and 14.3% of those age 65 or over.

== Economy ==
"Smart Growth" in Morristown

Companies based in Morristown include Capsugel, Reworld, Louis Berger Group, Schindler Group and the Morristown & Erie Railway, a local short-line freight railway and Honeywell.

Morristown Medical Center, with 5,500 employees, is Morristown's largest employer. In a ruling issued in June 2015, Tax Court Judge Vito Bianco ruled that the hospital would be required to pay property taxes on nearly all of its campus in the town.

== Arts and culture ==
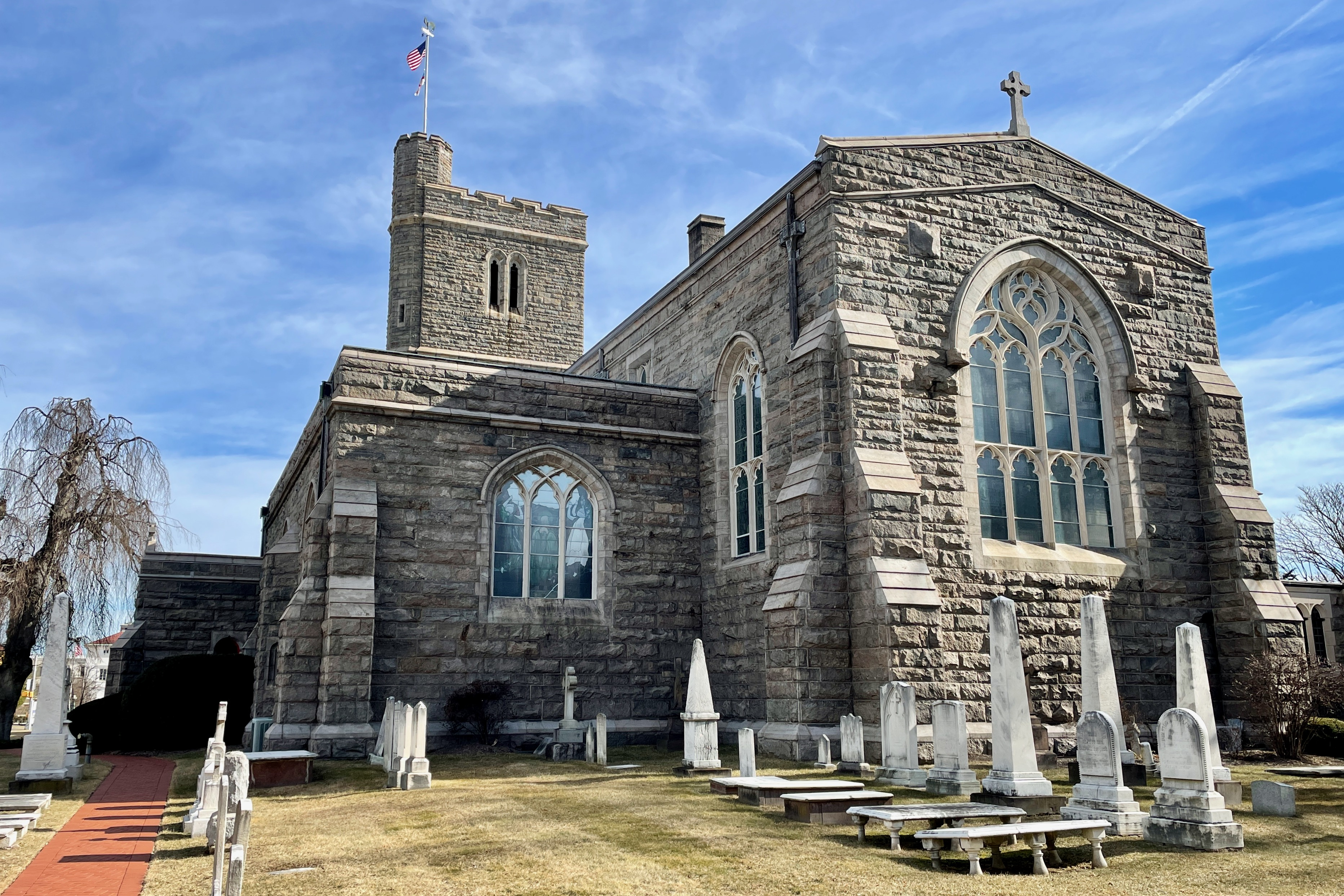
St. Peter's Episcopal Church

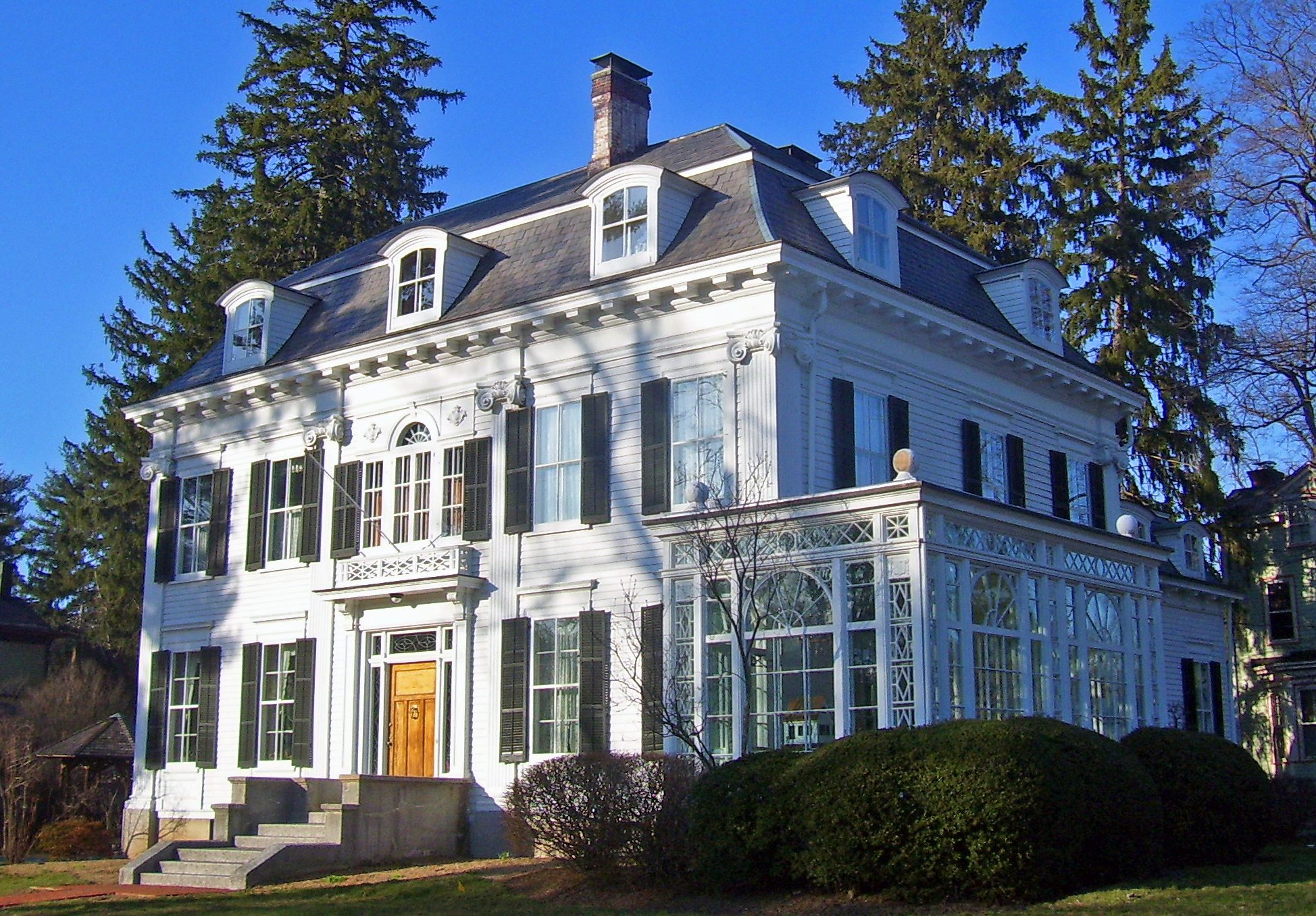
Home of Thomas Nast, known as Villa Fontana

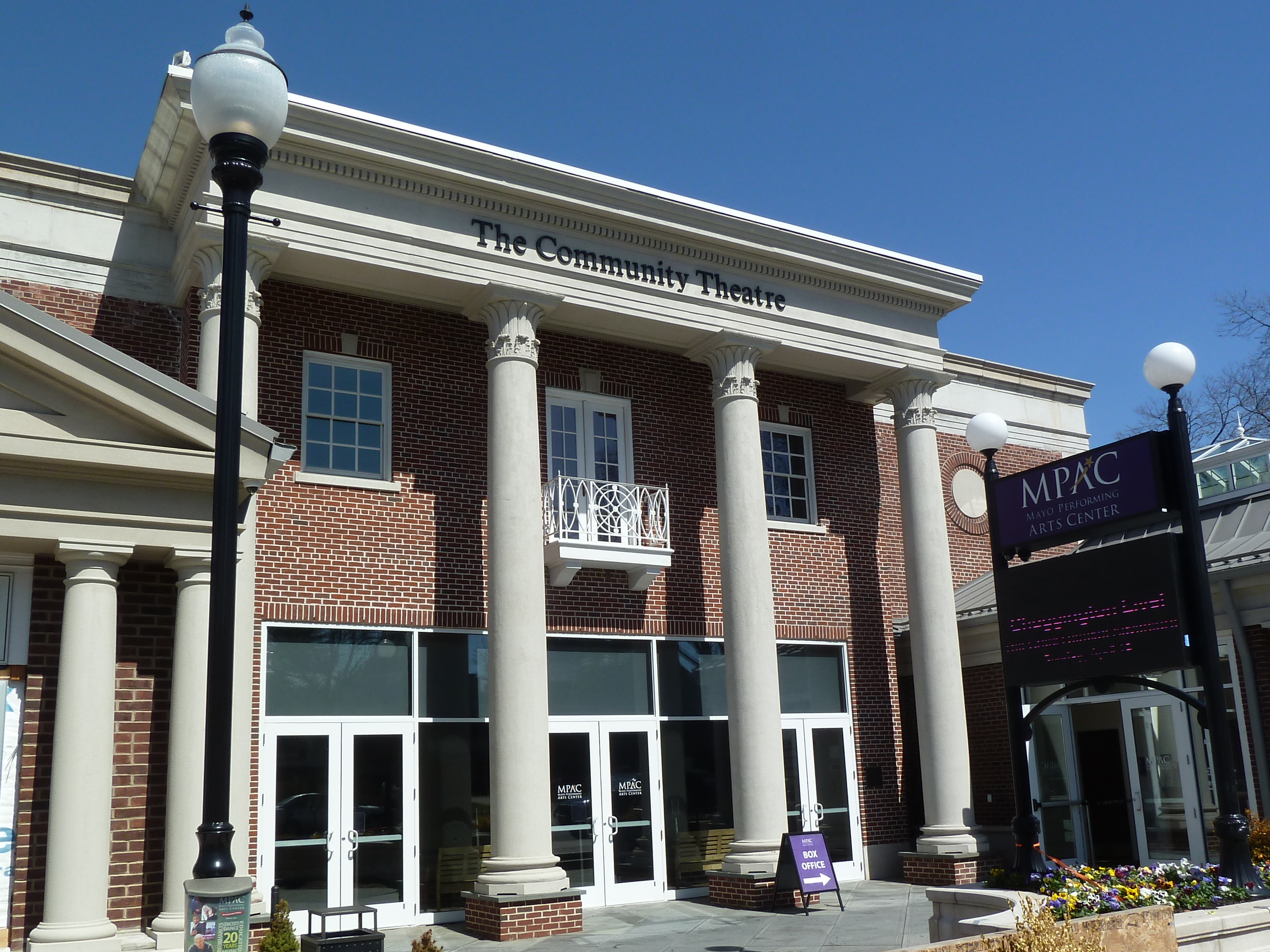
Mayo Performing Arts Center

=== Main sites ===
- Morristown National Historical Park – Four historic sites around Morristown associated with the American Revolutionary War, including Jockey Hollow, a park that includes a visitor center, the Revolution-era Wick farm, encampment site of George Washington's Continental Army, and around 25 miles of hiking trails, and the Washington's Headquarters & Ford Mansion, a Revolution-era Georgian-style mansion used by George Washington as his headquarters during the Jockey Hollow encampment.
- Speedwell Lake – Park with an old dam, other ruins, and more. Patriots Path, a footpath that runs through Northern New Jersey winds through this park.
- Morristown Green – Park at the center of town which was the old town "common" or "green." It is the site of several Revolutionary War and Civil war monuments (including one with George Washington, Alexander Hamilton, and the Marquis De Lafayette discussing the arrival of French aid to the colonies), and is surrounded by historic churches, the colonial county-courthouse, and a shopping and restaurant district.
- St. Peter's Episcopal Church – Large McKim Mead and White church with bell tower, fine stained glass and medieval furnishings.
- Acorn Hall – 1853 Victorian Italianate mansion and home to the Morris County Historical Society. Donated to the historical society in 1971 by Mary Crane Hone, the mansion retained much of its original furnishings and accouterments as it remained in the same family for over a century. It is currently operated as a museum and is the headquarters of the Morris County Historical Society.
- Morris Museum – formally incorporated in 1943. The museum's permanent displays include rocks, minerals, fossils, animal mounts, a model railroad, and Native American crafts, pottery, carving, basketry and textiles.
- Mayo Performing Arts Center – former Walter Reade movie theater originally constructed in 1937 that has been converted into a 1,302-seat performing arts center.
- The Seeing Eye – first school in North America for training and connecting guide dogs with blind and visually impaired students.
- Speedwell Ironworks – National Historic Landmark and museum at the site where the electric telegraph was first presented to the public, on January 11, 1838.

=== Libraries ===
- Morristown and Morris Township Public Library - Originating as informal book trading in 1792, the library was officially incorporated in 1866. After growing to 30,000 volumes, a 1914 fire destroyed the lyceum and much of its contents. In 1916, textile merchant Grinnell Willis constructed and paid for a new fireproof building. Its Modern Mondays Reading Club, an exclusive women's-only book club established in 1921, included prominent community members such as anthropologist Ethel Cutler Freeman; writer Dorothy Kunhardt; local farmer Caroline Rose Foster; and Elinor Parker, manager of Scribner's Book Store.

=== Historic sites ===
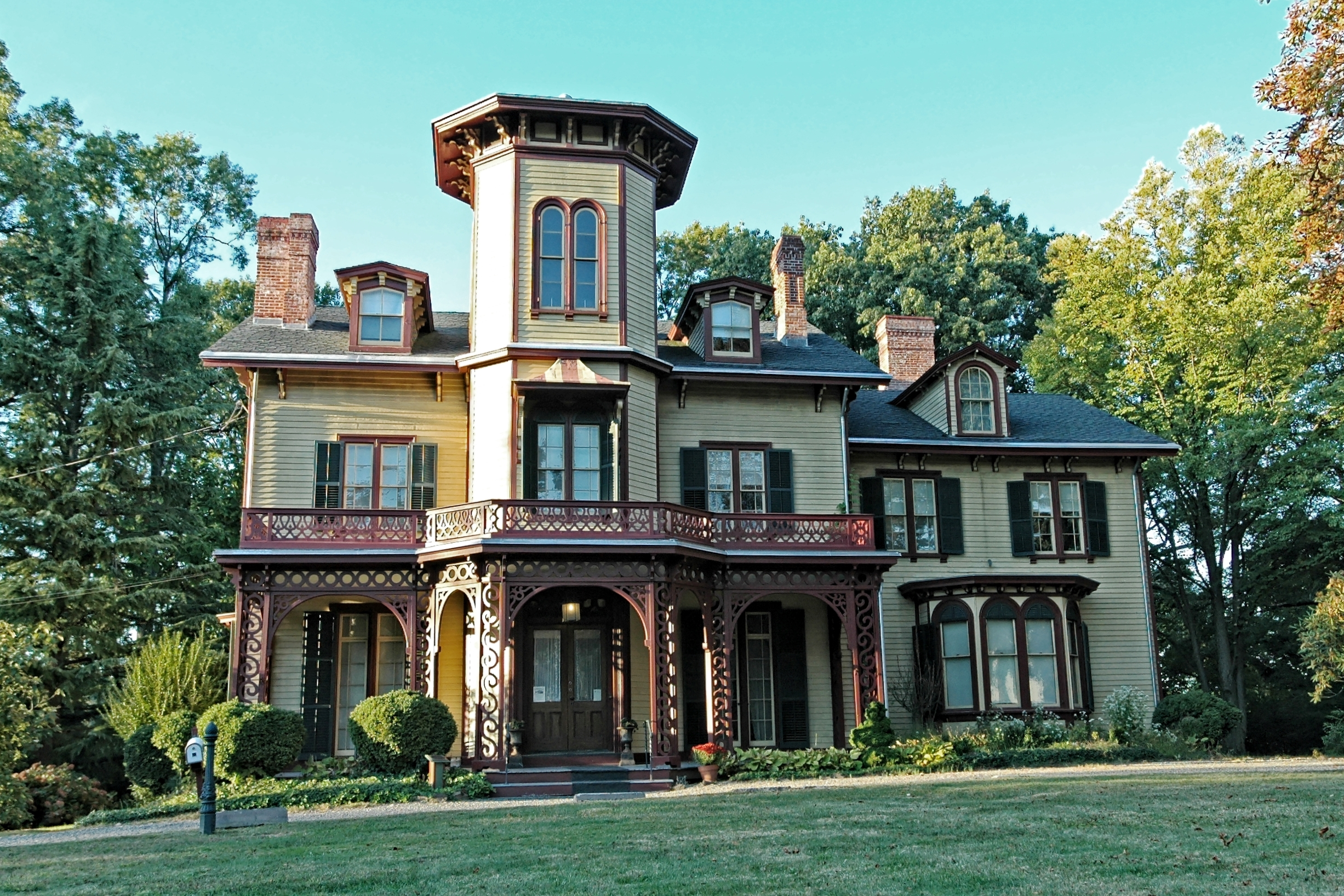
Acorn Hall, headquarters of the Morris County Historical Society

Morristown is home to the following locations on the National Register of Historic Places:

- Acorn Hall – 68 Morris Avenue (added 1973)
- Boisaubin Manor – Southeast of Morristown on Treadwell Avenue (added 1976)
- Dr. Jabez Campfield House – 5 Olyphant Place (added 2008)
- Dr. Lewis Condict House – 51 South Street (added 1973)
- Cutler Homestead – 21 Cutler Street (added 1975)
- Delaware, Lackawanna and Western Railroad Station – 132 Morris Street (added 1980)
- Fordville – East of Morristown at 30 Ford Hill Road (added 1978)
- Glanville Blacksmith Shop – 47 Bank Street (added 1987)
- Jenkins-Mead House – 14 Revere Road (added 1997)
- Lindenwold – 247 South Street (added 1986)
- Timothy Mills House – 27 Mills Street (added 1975)
- Morris County Courthouse – Washington St. between Court Street and Western Avenue (added 1977)
- Morristown District – Roughly bounded by the cemetery, King Place, Madison and Colles Avenues., DeHart Street, and North Park Place (added 1973), Boundary Increase Irregularly bounded by Lackawanna, Franklin Place, James Street, Ogden Place, Doughty, Mt. Kemble, Western, and Speedwell Avenues (added 1986)
- Morristown National Historical Park – At junction of U.S. 202 and NJ 24 (added 1966)
- Morristown School – Junction of Whippany Road and Hanover Avenue, Morris Township (added 1996)
- Mount Kemble Home – 1 Mt. Kemble Avenue (added 1986)
- Thomas Nast Home – MacCulloch Avenue and Miller Road (added 1966)
- Normandy Park Historic District – Normandy Parkway, between Columbia Turnpike and Madison Avenue, Morris Township (added 1996)
- Oak Dell – Franklin Street and Madison Avenue (added 1986)
- Joseph W. Revere House – Northwest of Morristown on Mendham Avenue (added 1973), Fosterfields Boundary Increase at junction of Mendham and Kahdena Roads, Morris Township (added 1991)
- Speedwell Village-The Factory – 333 Speedwell Avenue (added 1974)
- Spring Brook House – 167 James Street (added 1986)
- Thorne and Eddy Estates – East of Morristown on Columbia Road (added 1978)
- Whippany Farm – 53 East Hanover Avenue (added 1977)
- Willow Hall – 330 Speedwell Avenue (added 2011)

=== Statues ===
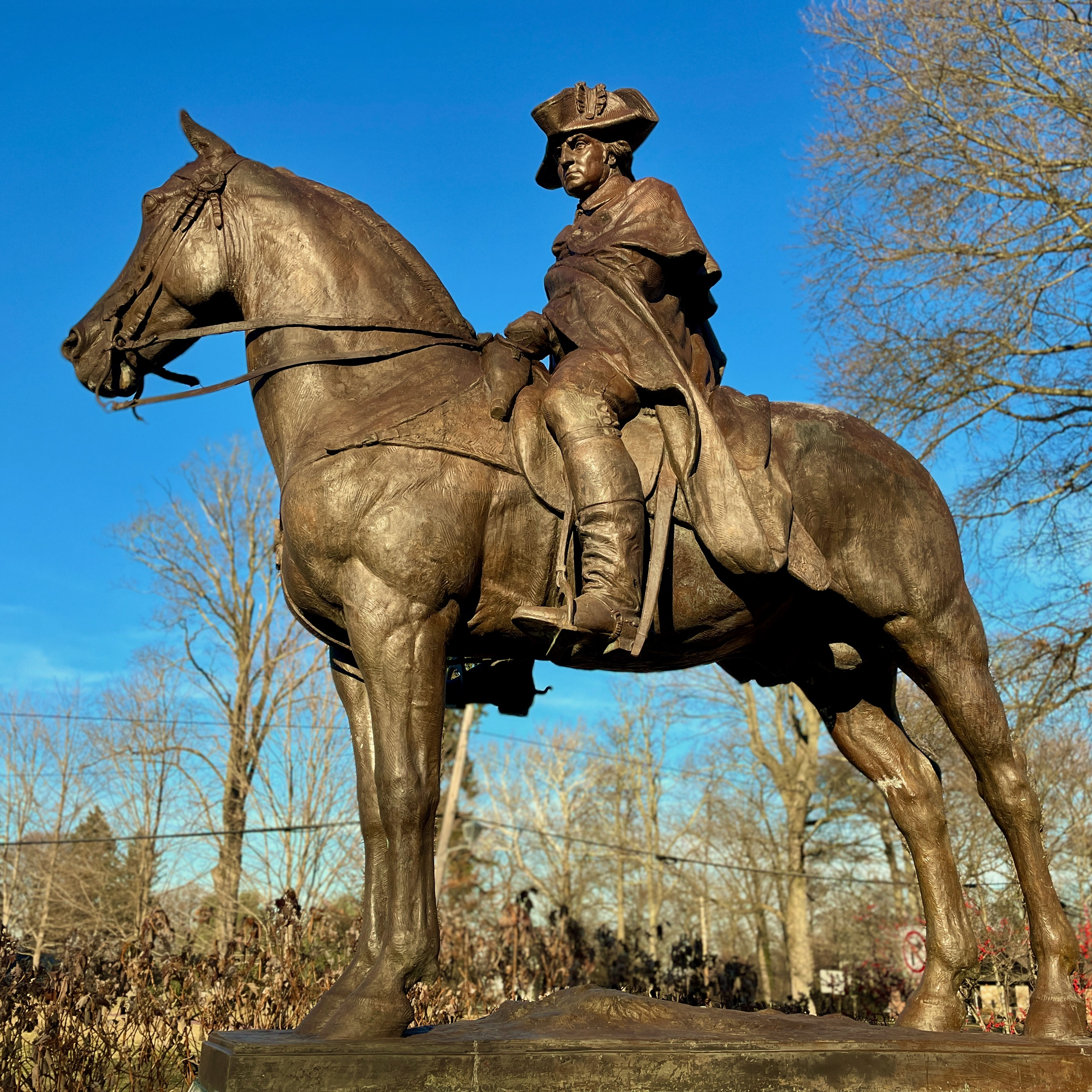
George Washington by Frederick Roth

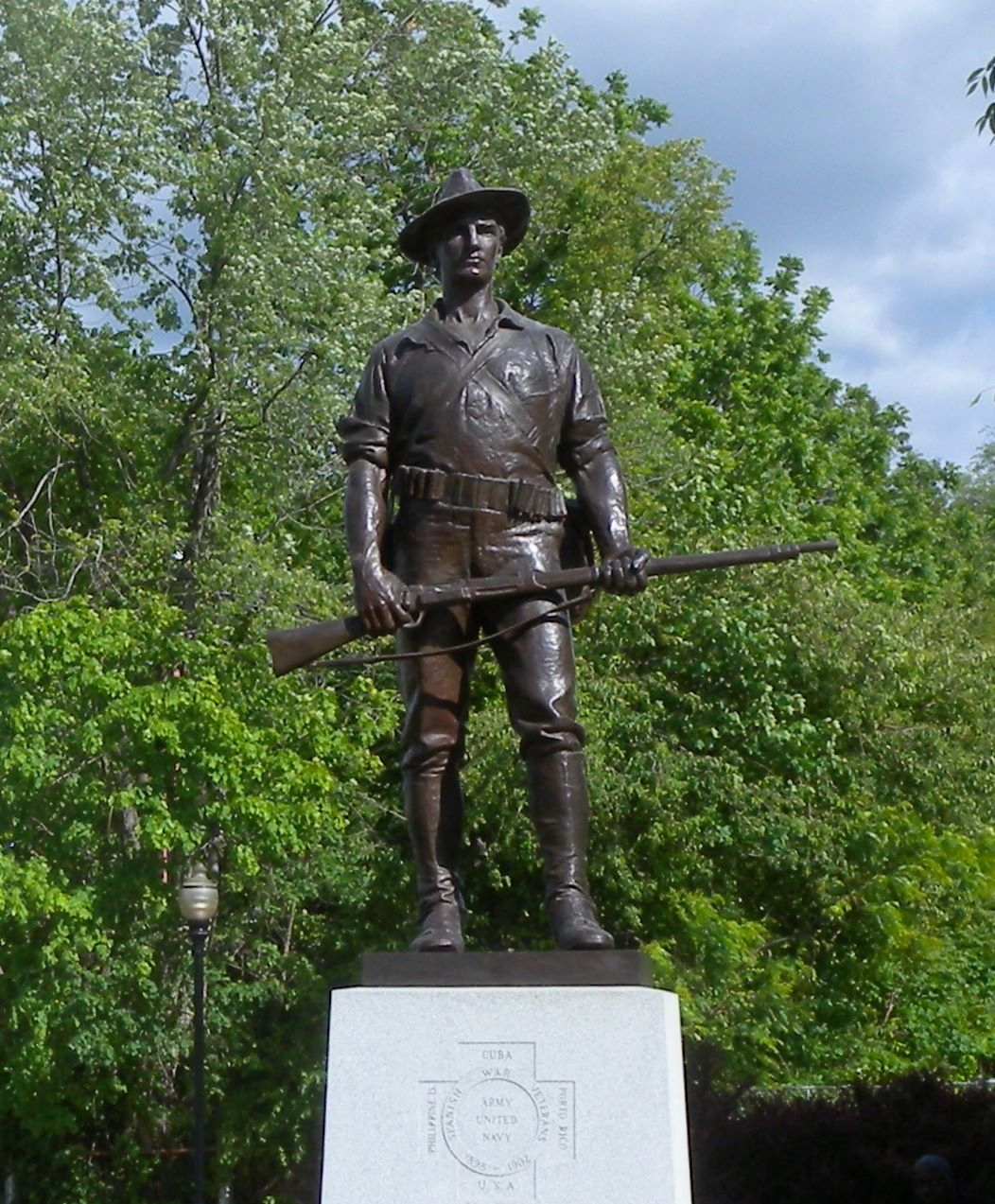
The Hiker by Theo Alice Ruggles Kitson

- An equestrian statue of George Washington by the sculptor Frederick Roth is located near the Ford Mansion, Washington's Headquarters from December 1779 to June 1780 during the American Revolutionary War. It was dedicated on October 19, 1928, the anniversary of the surrender of British General Charles Cornwallis at Yorktown in 1781.
- A copy of The Hiker by Theo Alice Ruggles Kitson, commemorating the soldiers who fought in the Spanish–American War, was installed at the corner of Elm Street and Morris Avenue in 1948.
- One of only two heroic statues of Thomas Paine in the United States is located in Morristown; the other is found in Bordentown, NJ.
- One of the few statues depicting an unblindfolded Lady Justice adorns the façade of the Courthouse.
- A statue of Morris Frank, the co-founder of The Seeing Eye guide dog school for the blind, and his dog Buddy stands in a corner of the green.
- The Alliance (2007) by Brooklyn's Studio EIS, featuring bronze figures of George Washington, Alexander Hamilton and the Marquis de Lafayette. The statue is in the Morristown Green.

== Sports ==
The New Jersey Stampede (formerly the Minutemen) are a professional inline hockey team that competes in the Professional Inline Hockey Association.

The United States Equestrian Team, the international equestrian team for the United States, was founded in 1950 at the Coates estate on Van Beuren Road in Morristown.

Morristown has a cricketing club, the first in North America.

The Morristown 1776 Association Football Club is a soccer club that competes in the North Jersey Soccer League and MCSSA.

== Government ==
=== Local government ===
Morristown is governed within the Faulkner Act, formally known as the Optional Municipal Charter Law, under a Plan F Mayor-Council system of New Jersey municipal government, which went into effect on January 1, 1974. The town is one of 71 municipalities (of the 564) statewide that use this form of government. The Morristown Town Council is composed of seven members, of which three members are elected at-large representing the entire town and one representative is chosen from each of the town's four wards. Members are elected on a partisan basis to four-year terms of office on a staggered basis in odd-numbered years as part of the November general election, with the four ward seats up for vote together and the at-large and mayoral seats up for vote together two years later. As the legislative arm of the government, the council is responsible for making and setting policy for the town.

As of 2026, the Mayor of Morristown is Democrat Timothy Dougherty, whose term of office ends December 31, 2029. Members of the Morristown Town Council are Council President Steven Pylypchuk (D, Ward III, 2027), Council Vice President Christopher Russo (D; Ward IV, 2027), Toshiba Foster (D; At Large, 2029), Robert Iannaccone (I, Ward I, 2027), Tina Lindsey (D, Ward II, 2027), David Silva (D; At Large, 2029) and Nathan Umbriac (D; At Large, 2029).

=== Federal, state, and county representation ===
Morristown is located in the 11th Congressional District and is part of New Jersey's 25th state legislative district.

For the 119th United States Congress, New Jersey's 11th congressional district is represented by Analilia Mejia (D, Glen Ridge) who was elected in a 2026 special election to serve for the remainder of the Congress following the resignation Mikie Sherrill (D, Montclair), who was elected Governor of New Jersey in 2025. New Jersey is represented in the United States Senate by Democrats Cory Booker (Newark, term ends 2027) and Andy Kim (Moorestown, term ends 2031).

For the 2026–2027 session, the 25th legislative district of the New Jersey Legislature is represented in the State Senate by Anthony M. Bucco (R, Boonton Township) and in the General Assembly by Aura K. Dunn (R, Mendham Borough) and Marisa Sweeney (D, Morristown).

Morris County is governed by a Board of County Commissioners comprised of seven members who are elected at-large in partisan elections to three-year terms on a staggered basis, with either one or three seats up for election each year as part of the November general election. Actual day-to-day operation of departments is supervised by County Administrator Deena Leary.

As of 2026, Morris County's Commissioners (with all terms ending December 31) are Director Stephen H. Shaw (R, Mountain Lakes, 2027), Deputy Director John Krickus (R, Washington Township, 2027), Douglas Cabana (R, Boonton Township, 2028), Thomas J. Mastrangelo (R, Montville, 2028), Christine Myers (R, Harding Township, 2028), Tayfun Selen (R, Chatham Township, 2026), and Deborah Smith (R, Denville Township, 2027).

The county's constitutional officers are County Clerk Ann F. Grossi (R, Parsippany–Troy Hills, 2028), Sheriff James M. Gannon (R, Boonton Township, 2028) and Surrogate Heather Darling (R, Roxbury, 2029).

=== Politics ===
As of June 2019, a total of 11,330 voters were registered in Morristown, of which 5,087 (44.9%) were Democrats, 2,208 (19.5%) Republicans, and 4,035 (35.6%) were registered as Unaffiliated.

United States presidential election results for Morristown 2024 2020 2016 2012 2008 2004
Year	Republican		Democratic		Third party(ies)	
Year	No.	%	No.	%	No.	%
2024	2,714	33.49%	5,225	64.48%	164	2.02%
2020	2,377	27.67%	6,069	70.66%	143	1.66%
2016	2,033	27.86%	4,984	68.30%	280	3.84%
2012	2,117	31.69%	4,485	67.13%	79	1.18%
2008	2,084	30.25%	4,738	68.78%	67	0.97%
2004	2,370	36.12%	4,138	63.07%	53	0.81%

In the 2016 presidential election, Democrat Hillary Clinton received 67.4% of the vote (4,984 votes), ahead of Republican Donald Trump with 27.5% (2,033 votes), and other candidates with 5.1% (294 votes), among the 7,470 ballots cast by the town's 11,060 voters, for a turnout of 67.5%. In the 2012 presidential election, Democrat Barack Obama received 67.1% of the vote (4,485 cast), ahead of Republican Mitt Romney with 31.7% (2,117 votes), and other candidates with 1.2% (79 votes), among the 6,727 ballots cast by the town's 10,212 registered voters (46 ballots were spoiled), for a turnout of 65.9%.

Gubernatorial election results for Morristown
Year	Republican		Democratic		Third party(ies)	
Year	No.	%	No.	%	No.	%
2025	1,876	29.19%	4,506	70.12%	44	0.68%
2021	1,611	33.68%	3,126	65.36%	46	0.96%
2017	1,194	29.63%	2,758	68.44%	78	1.94%
2013	1,871	52.73%	1,602	45.15%	75	2.11%
2009	1,623	38.17%	2,263	53.22%	366	8.61%
2005	1,437	32.91%	2,804	64.21%	126	2.89%

In the 2021 gubernatorial election, Democrat Phil Murphy received 65.6% of the vote (3,126 votes), ahead of Republican Jack Ciattarelli with 33.7% (1,611 votes), and other candidates with 1.0% (46 votes), among the 4,854 ballots cast by the town's 12,836 voters, for a turnout of 37.8%. In the 2017 gubernatorial election, Democrat Phil Murphy received 68.44% of the vote (2,758 votes), ahead of Republican Kim Guadagno with 29.6% (1,194 votes), and other candidates with 1.9% (78 votes), among the 4,164 ballots cast by the town's 10,901 voters, for a turnout of 38.2%. In the 2013 gubernatorial election, Republican Chris Christie received 52.7% of the vote (1,871 cast), ahead of Democrat Barbara Buono with 45.2% (1,602 votes), and other candidates with 2.1% (75 votes), among the 3,780 ballots cast by the town's 10,124 registered voters (232 ballots were spoiled), for a turnout of 37.3%.

United States Senate election results for Morristown1
Year	Republican		Democratic		Third party(ies)	
Year	No.	%	No.	%	No.	%
2024	2,505	33.21%	4,855	64.37%	182	2.41%
2018	1,931	31.42%	3,972	64.64%	242	3.94%
2012	1,930	31.58%	4,080	66.75%	102	1.67%
2006	1,446	35.98%	2,500	62.20%	73	1.82%

United States Senate election results for Morristown2
Year	Republican		Democratic		Third party(ies)	
Year	No.	%	No.	%	No.	%
2020	2,504	29.81%	5,782	68.83%	115	1.37%
2014	869	29.17%	2,069	69.45%	41	1.38%
2013	736	27.48%	1,919	71.66%	23	0.86%
2008	2,028	33.80%	3,834	63.90%	138	2.30%

== Education ==
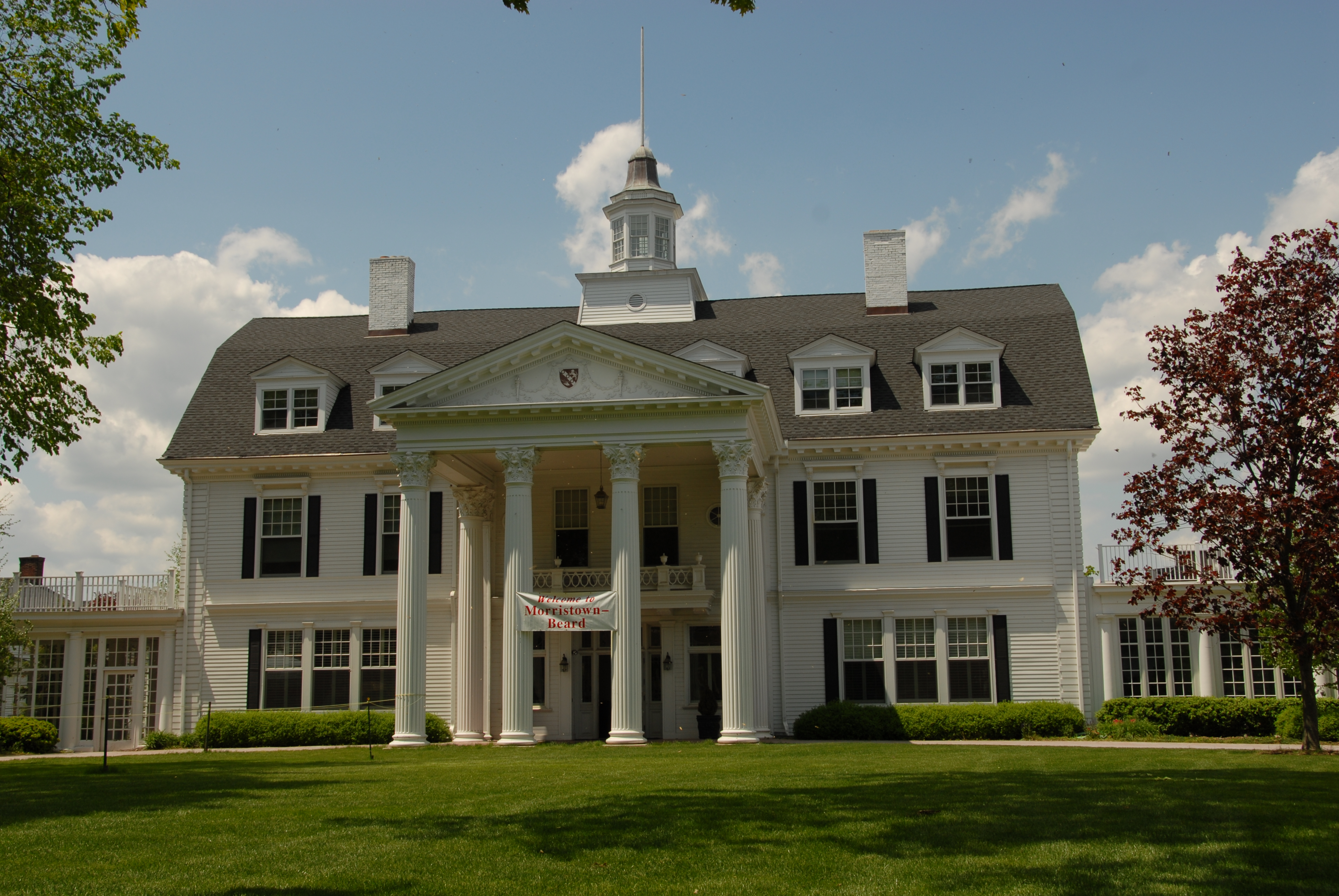
Morristown–Beard School

The Morris School District is a regional public school district that serves students in pre-kindergarten through twelfth grade from the communities of Morristown and Morris Township, and high school students (grades 9–12) from Morris Plains who attend the high school as part of a sending/receiving relationship with the Morris Plains Schools. Schools in the district (with 2023–24 enrollment data from the National Center for Education Statistics) are Lafayette Learning Center (with 108 students in grade PreK), Alexander Hamilton School (248; 3–5), Hillcrest School (268; K–2), Thomas Jefferson School (305; 3–5), Normandy Park School (361; K–5), Sussex Avenue School (336; 3–5), Alfred Vail School (334; K–2), Woodland School (293; K–2), Frelinghuysen Middle School (1,026; 6–8) and Morristown High School (1,856; 9–12). The nine elected seats on the district's board of education are allocated based on the population of the constituent municipalities, with four seats assigned to Morristown.

In addition to a public school system, Morristown has several private schools. Primary and elementary schools include The Red Oaks School, an independent private school founded in 1965 and serving pre-kindergarten through eighth grade, that offers both Montessori and International Baccalaureate programs. Assumption Roman Catholic is a grade school (K–8) that operates under the auspices of the Roman Catholic Diocese of Paterson and was one of 11 schools in the state recognized in 2014 by the United States Department of Education's National Blue Ribbon Schools Program. The Peck School, a private day school which serves approximately 300 students in kindergarten through grade eight, dates back to 1893 when it was originally established as Miss Sutphen's School. Delbarton School is an all-boys Roman Catholic school with approximately 540 students in grades seven through twelve, that began serving resident students in 1939 after having previously served as a seminary. The Morristown-Beard School, a private co-ed school formed from the merger of two previously existing institutions, Morristown Preparatory School and Miss Beard's School, serves grades 6 through 12. In addition, Villa Walsh Academy, a private Catholic college preparatory school conducted by the Religious Teachers Filippini, is located in Morristown.

The Academy of Saint Elizabeth was founded at Morristown in 1860 by the Sisters of Charity, however when municipal boundaries were redrawn in 1895, the academy found itself in the Convent Station section of the adjacent Morris Township.

The Rabbinical College of America, one of the largest Chabad Lubavitch Chasidic yeshivas in the world is located in Morristown. The Rabbinical College of America has a Baal Teshuva yeshiva for students of diverse Jewish backgrounds, named Yeshiva Tiferes Bachurim. The New Jersey Regional Headquarters for the worldwide Chabad Lubavitch movement is located on the campus.

== Transportation ==
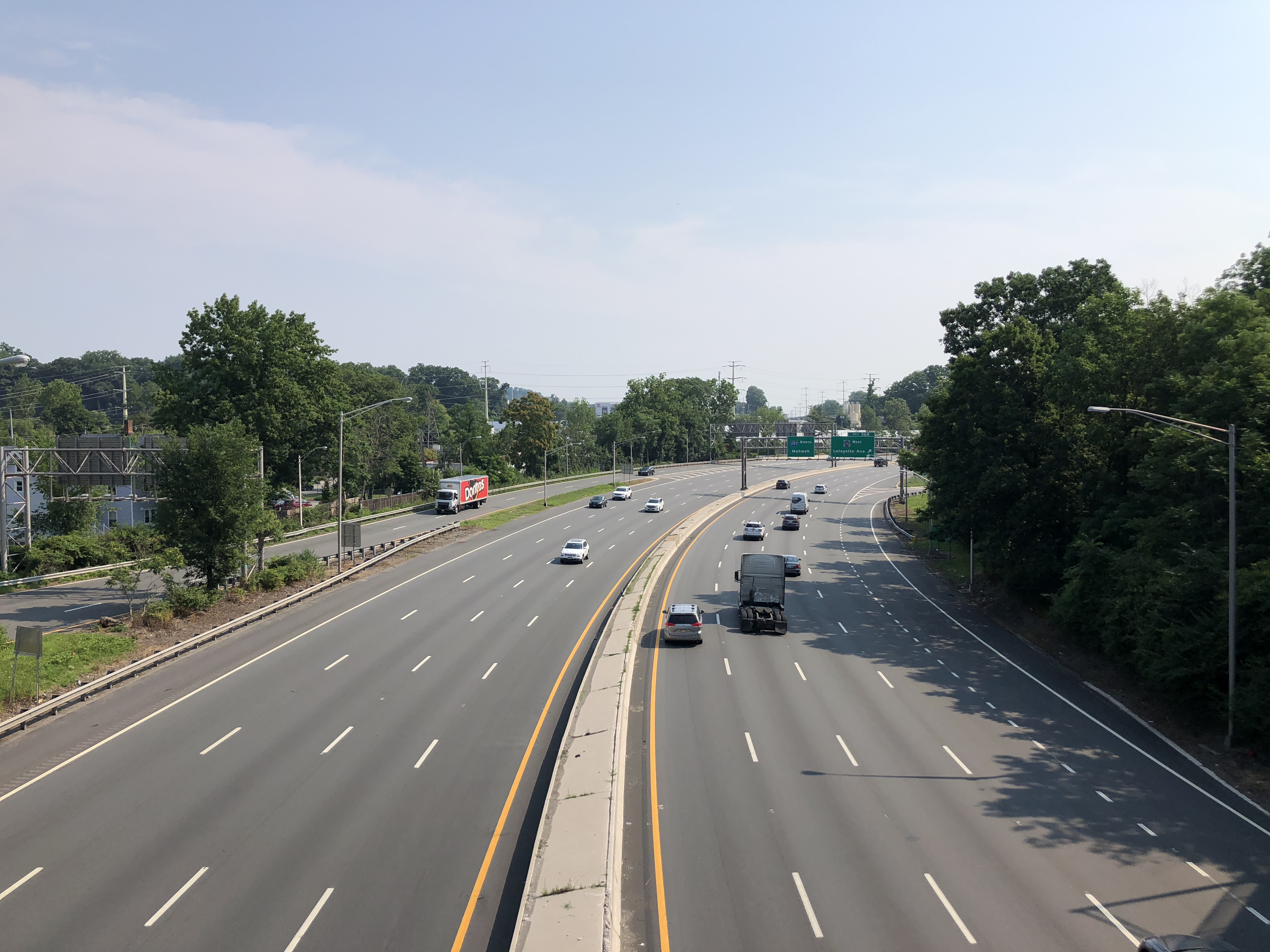
Interstate 287 northbound in Morristown

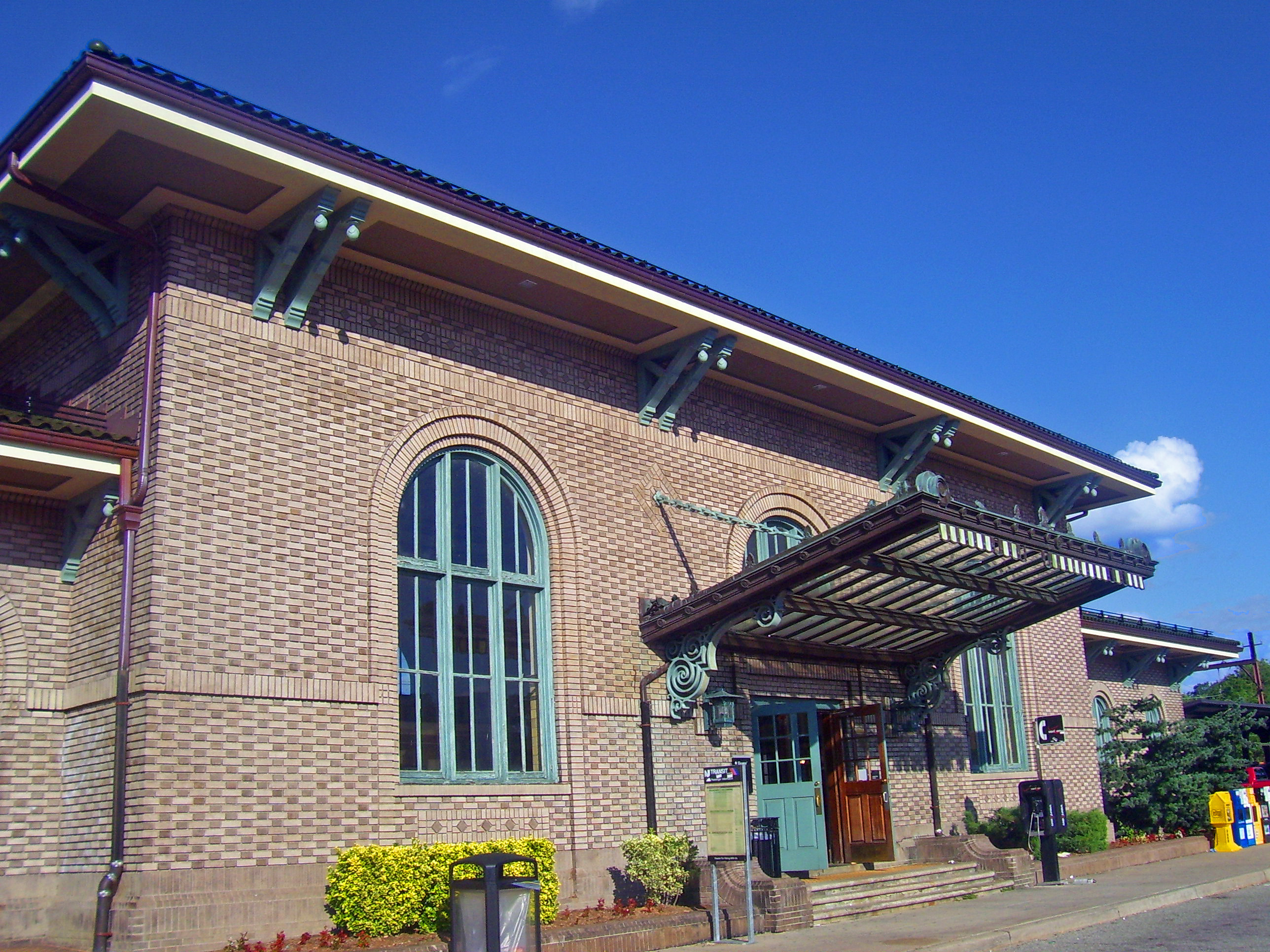
Morristown station

=== Roads and highways ===
As of May 2010, the town had a total of 39.98 miles (64.34 km) of roadways, of which 29.73 miles (47.85 km) were maintained by the municipality, 5.03 miles (8.10 km) by Morris County and 5.22 miles (8.40 km) by the New Jersey Department of Transportation.

Interstate 287 is the main highway providing access to Morristown. Two interchanges, Exit 35 and Exit 36, are located within the town. Other significant roads serving Morristown include U.S. Route 202, New Jersey Route 124 and County Route 510.

=== Public transportation ===
Morristown has attempted to implement transit-oriented development. Morristown was designated in 1999 as of one of New Jersey's first five "transit villages". In 1999, Morristown changed its zoning code to designate the area around the train station as a "Transit Village Core" for mixed-use. The designation was at least partly responsible for development plans for several mixed-use condominium developments.

NJ Transit offers rail service at the Morristown station which offers service on the Morristown Line to Newark Broad Street, Secaucus Junction, New York Penn Station and Hoboken Terminal. The town benefited from shortened commuting times to New York City due to the "Midtown Direct" service New Jersey Transit instituted in the 1990s.

NJ Transit local bus service is offered from the Morristown rail station, Morristown Medical Center and Headquarters Plaza on the 871, 872, 873, 874, 875 and 880 bus routes, replacing service that had been offered on the MCM1, MCM2, MCM3, MCM4, MCM8 and MCM10 routes until 2010, when subsidies to the local provider were eliminated as part of budget cuts.

Community Coach provides daily service between New York City and Morristown on bus route 77.

The town's Department of Public Works operates "Colonial Coach", which provides free transportation within Morristown.

The Whippany Line of the Morristown and Erie Railway, a small freight line, traverses the township. Established in 1895, the line runs from Morristown and runs through East Hanover Township and Hanover Township to Roseland.

=== Aviation ===
Morristown Municipal Airport is the closest public airport. While owned by the town, the airport is physically located in nearby Hanover Township, 3 miles east of Morristown proper.

Newark Liberty International Airport in Newark / Elizabeth is the closest airport with scheduled passenger service. It is approximately 20 minutes away via Route 24 and Interstate 78.

== Media ==
With its proximity to New York City and Newark, daily newspapers serving the community are The New York Times, The Wall Street Journal, and The Star-Ledger.

The Morristown Daily Record was published locally, before being renamed the Daily Record and moving to a near-by location. The New Jersey Monthly magazine is published locally.

WMTR is an AM radio station at 1250 kHz is licensed to Morristown. The station features an oldies format.

WJSV radio (90.5 FM) is the nonprofit radio station of Morristown High School, which also has a television show, Colonial Corner.

Hometown Tales, a public-access television show and podcast chronicling stories and urban legends from around the world, is loosely based in Morristown.

== Notable people ==
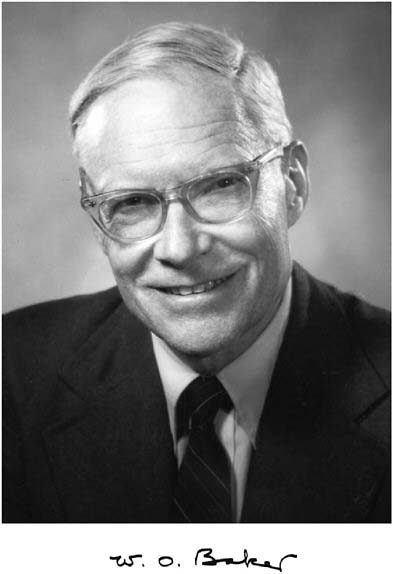
William O. Baker

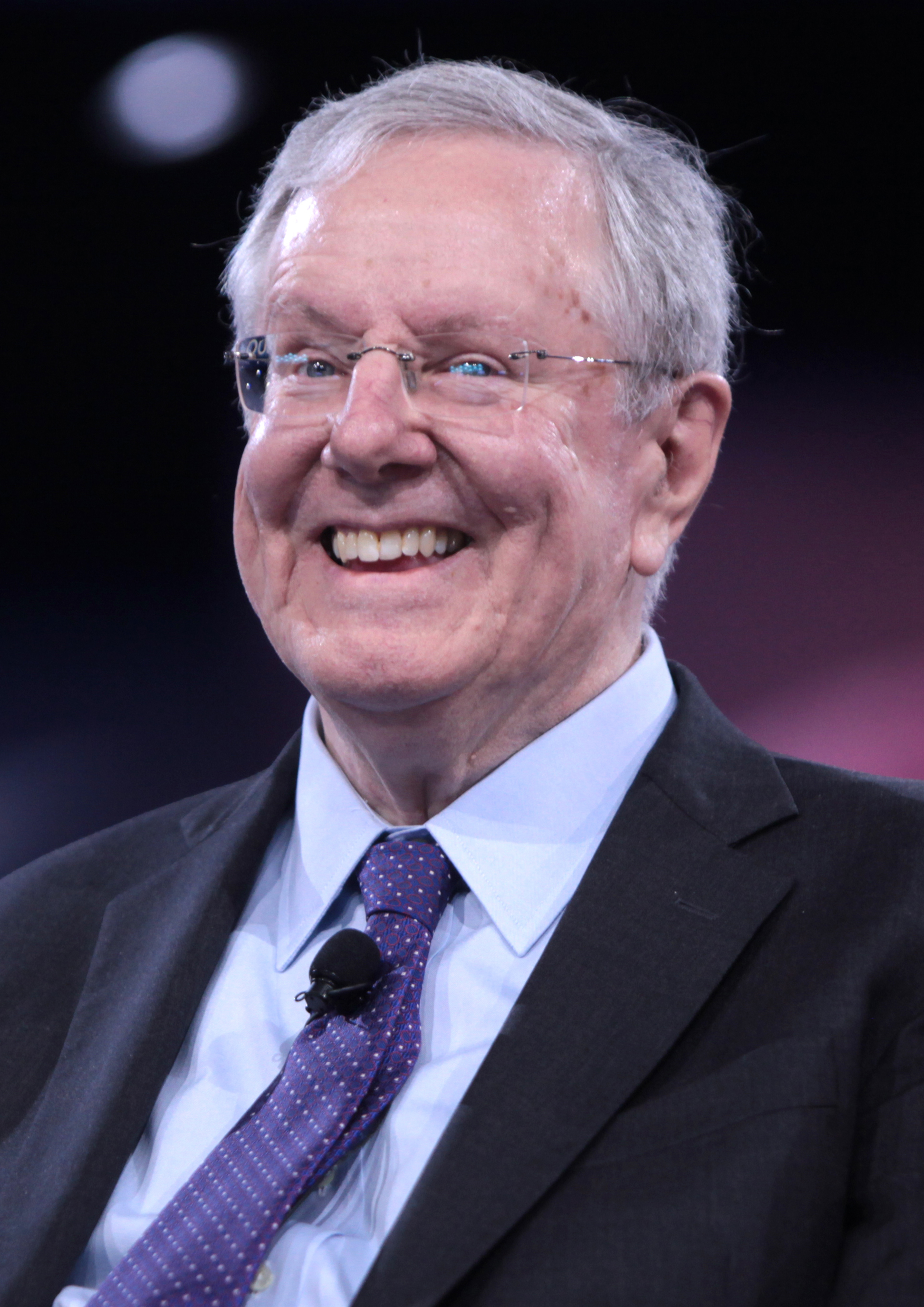
Steve Forbes

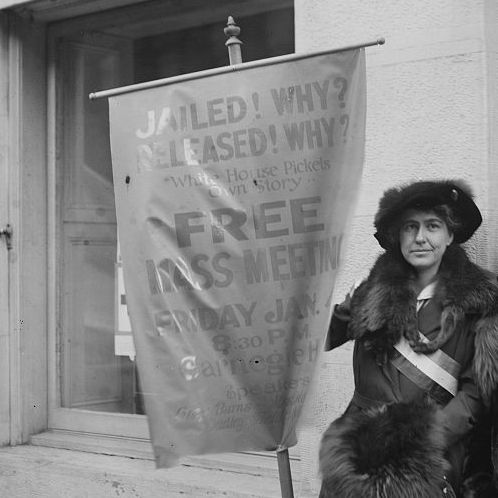
Julia Hurlbut

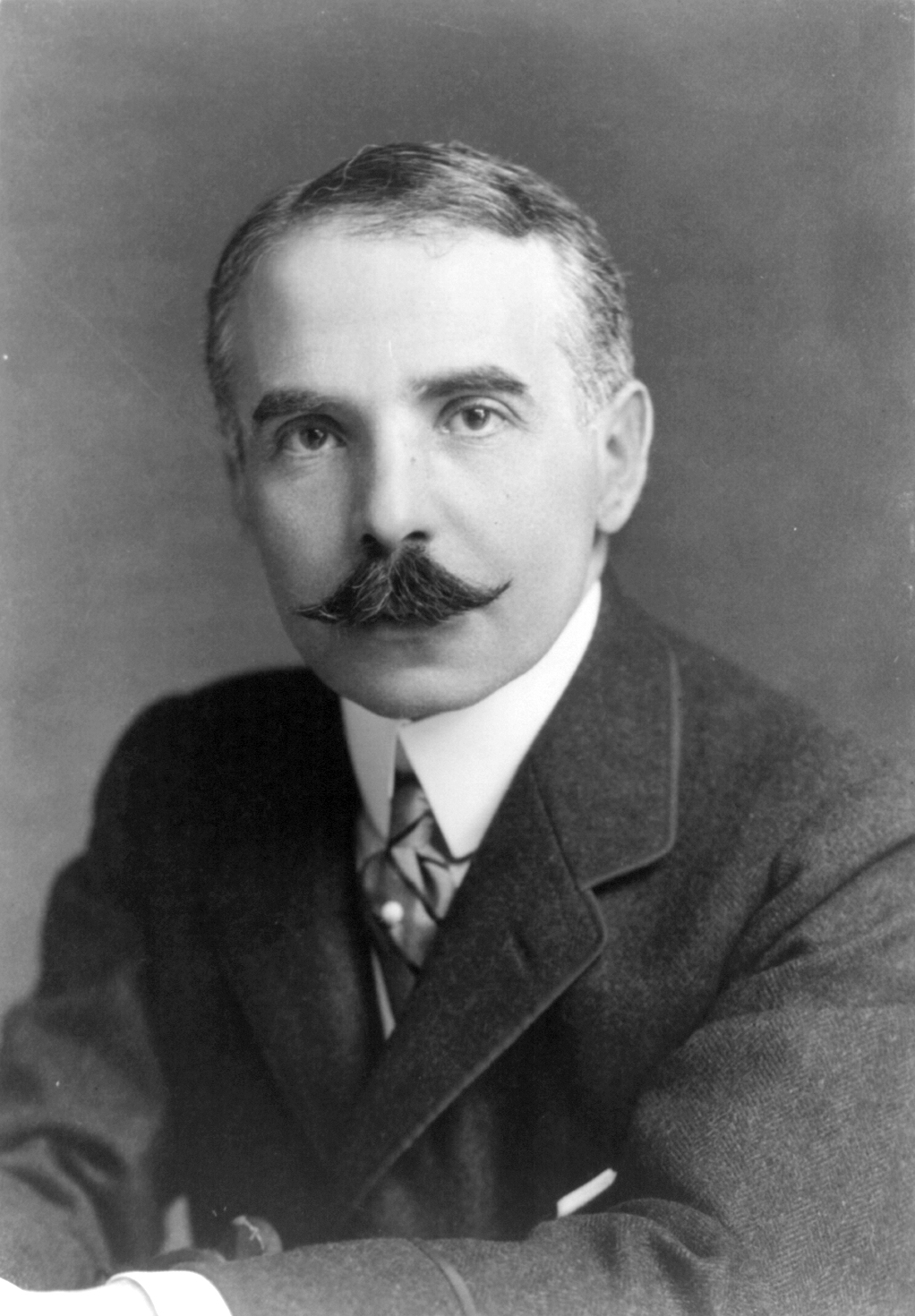
Otto Hermann Kahn

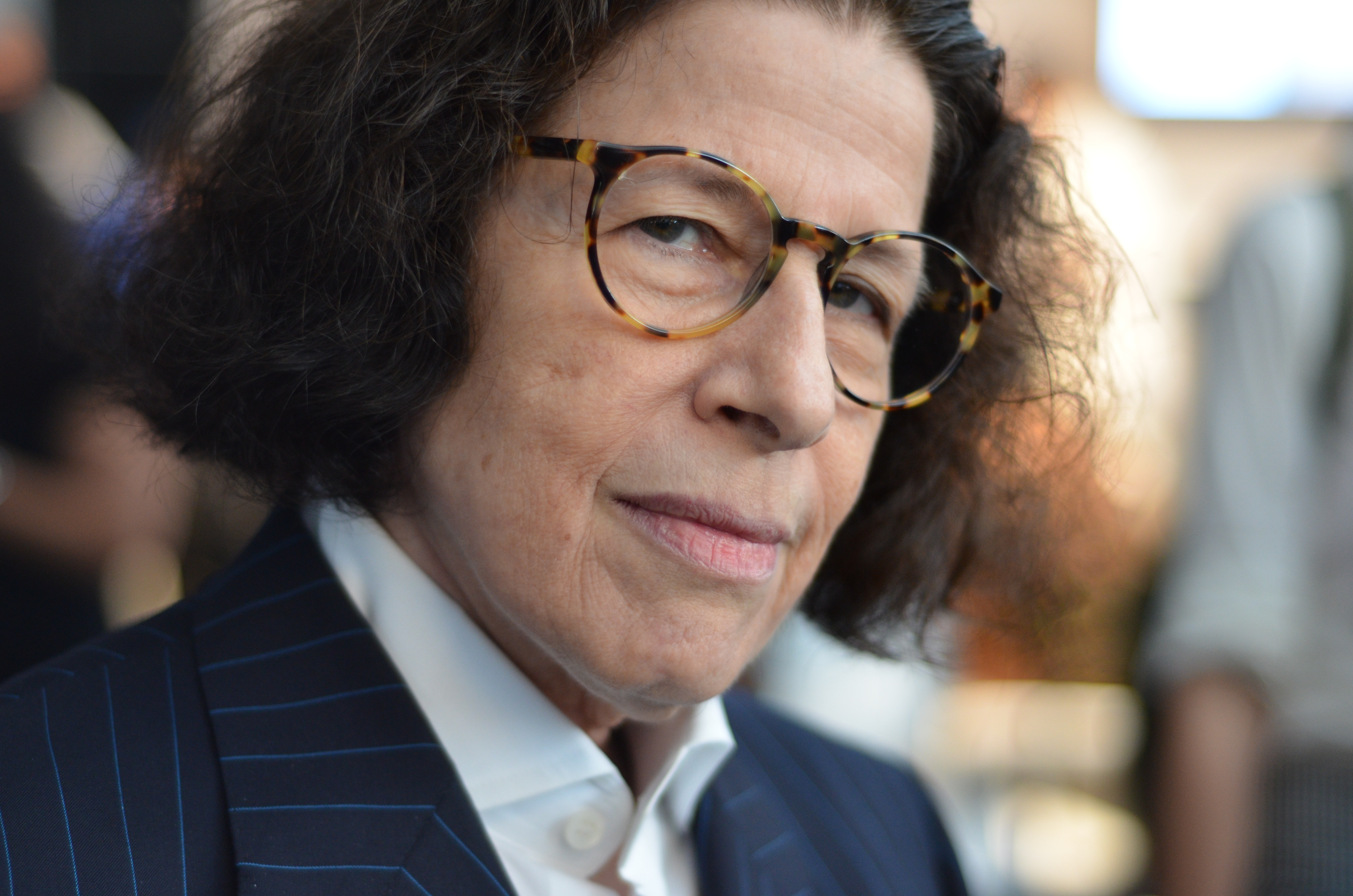
Fran Lebowitz

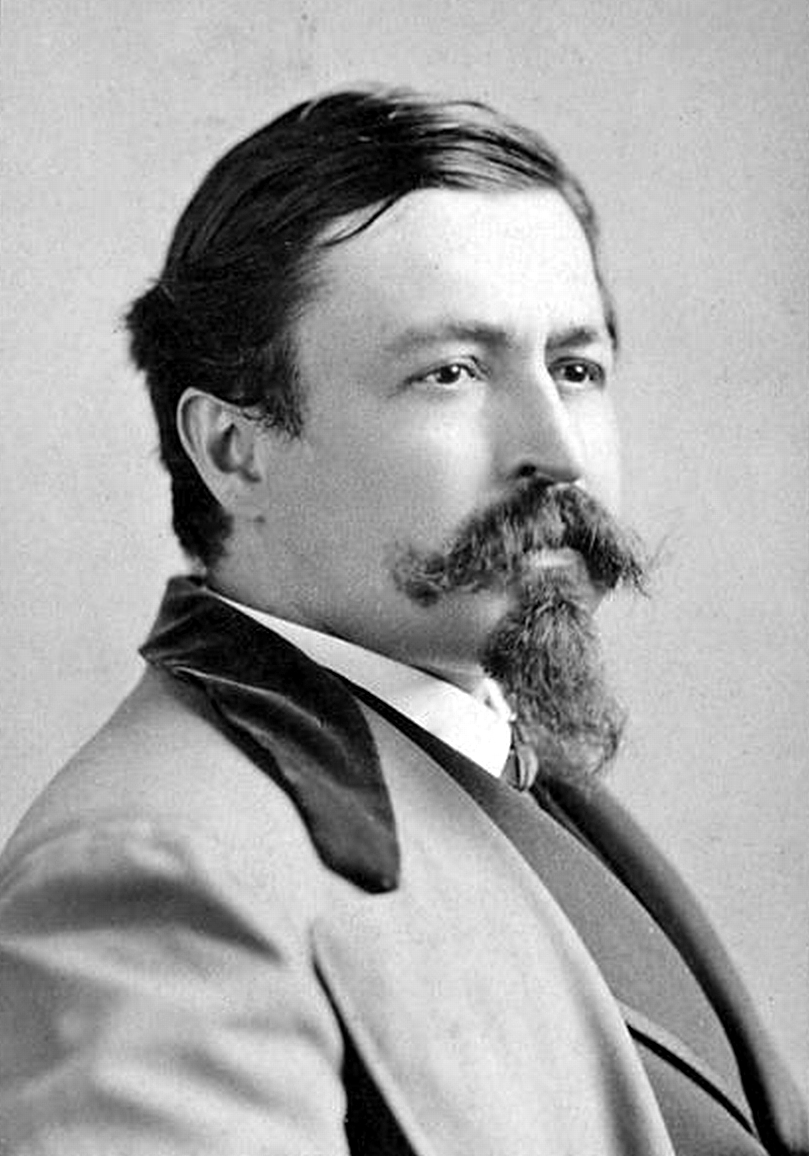
Thomas Nast

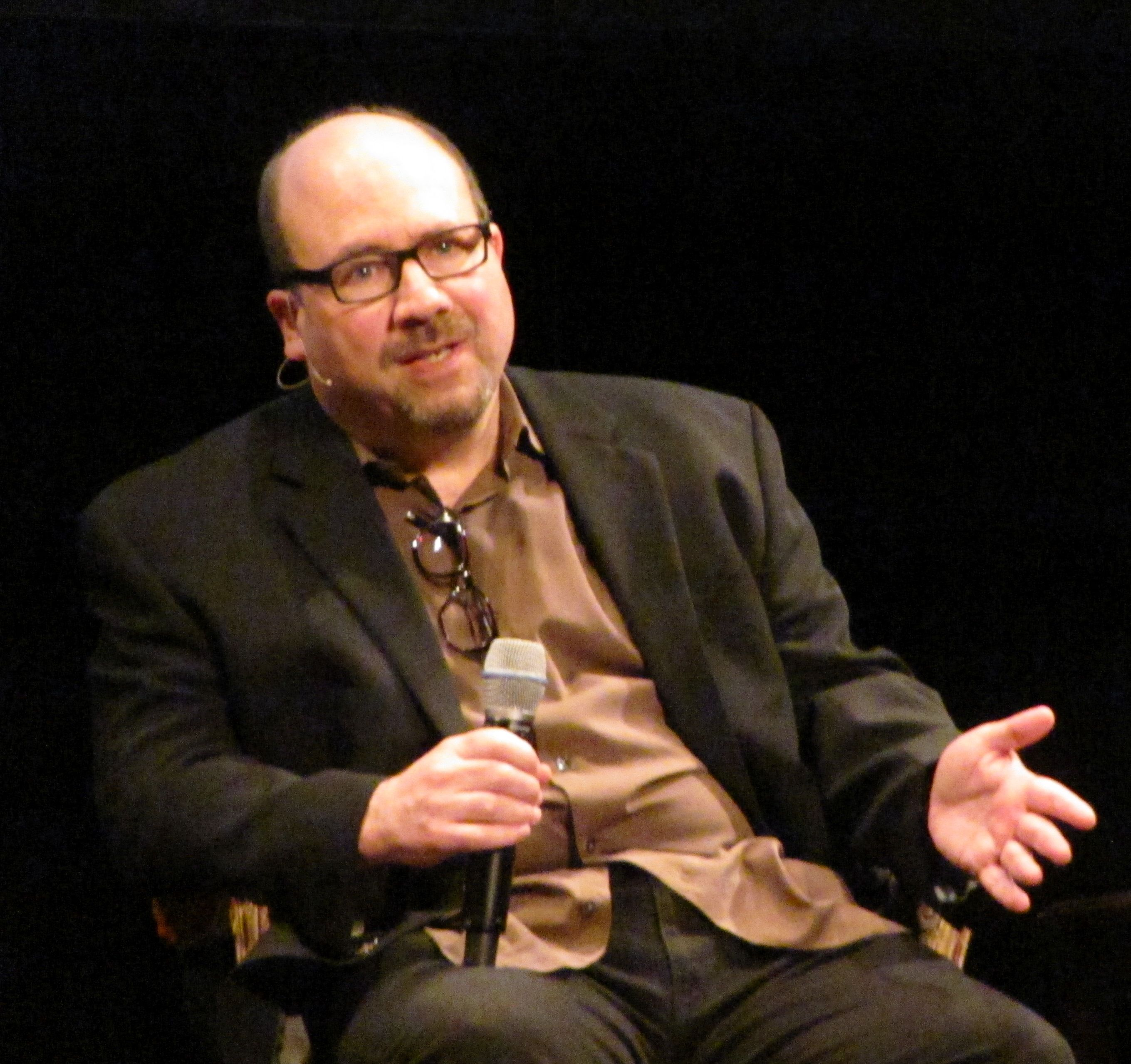
Craig Newmark

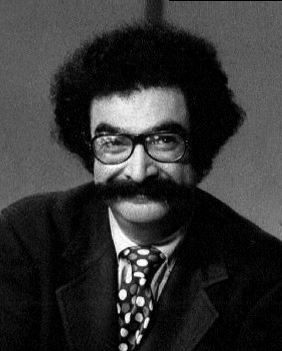
Gene Shalit

People who were born in, residents of, or otherwise closely associated with Morristown include:

- Frank D. Abell (1878–1964), politician who served in the New Jersey General Assembly in 1925 and 1926 and in the New Jersey Senate from 1926 to 1931
- Kenny Agostino (born 1992), professional ice hockey player for the New Jersey Devils of the National Hockey League
- Jack Alexy (born 2003), Olympic swimmer
- Mary Belle Allen (1922–1973), botanist, born in Morristown
- Joseph Bushnell Ames (1878–1928), novelist
- Kristina Apgar (born 1985), actress best known for her portrayal of Lily Smith on the CW's drama Privileged
- Michael Ashkin (born 1955), artist known for sculptures, videos, photographs and installations depicting marginalized, desolate landscapes
- William O. Baker (1915–2005), scientist who headed Bell Labs
- Bonnie Lee Bakley (1956–2001), murdered wife of Robert Blake; born in Morristown
- James Berardinelli (born 1967), film critic
- Vincenzo Bernardo (born 1990), soccer player and founder of Morris Elite SC
- Faire Binney (1900–1957), stage and film actress who starred in films during the silent era after making her debut in the 1918 film Sporting Life alongside her sister Constance Binney
- Anna Campbell Bliss (1925–2015), visual artist and architect
- Scott Blumstein (born 1992), poker player who won the 2017 World Series of Poker Main Event for $8,150,000
- Warren Bobrow (born c. 1961), mixologist, chef and writer known as the "Cocktail Whisperer"
- Rinker Buck (born 1950), author best known for his 1997 memoir Flight of Passage
- Hannah Este Burnet (1800–1858), First Lady of the Republic of Texas
- Tez Cadey (born 1993), French-American DJ, record producer and songwriter
- Jabez Campfield (1737–1821), doctor who served as a surgeon in the Continental Army during the American Revolutionary War
- Lincoln Child (born 1957), author of techno-thriller and horror novels
- S. H. H. Clark (1836–1900), railroad executive who was president of the Union Pacific and Missouri Pacific Railroads
- George T. Cobb (1813–1870), politician who represented New Jersey's 4th congressional district from 1861 to 1863 and was Mayor of Morristown from 1865 to 1869
- Herbert Coddington (born 1959), murderer and suspected serial killer who murdered two elderly women following the kidnapping of two teenage models in 1987
- Lewis Condict (1772–1862), physician and member of the United States House of Representatives from New Jersey
- Silas Condict (1738–1801), farmer, surveyor and landowner, who served as a delegate to the Continental Congress from New Jersey
- Jonathan Cooper (1950–2026), musician and luthier, known for his handcrafted violins
- Donald Cresitello, Mayor of Morristown from 2006 to 2010
- Augustus W. Cutler (1827–1897), member of the United States House of Representatives from New Jersey
- Jean Dalrymple (1902–1998), theater producer, manager, publicist and playwright, who was instrumental in the founding of New York City Center
- Joe Dante (born 1946), film director
- Edith Kunhardt Davis (1937–2020), author of more than 70 children's books
- Alex DeCroce (1936–2012), politician who served in the New Jersey General Assembly, where he represented the 26th Legislative District from 1989 until his death
- Ward Edwards (1927–2005), psychologist who was known for his work on decision theory and the formulation and revision of beliefs
- Dorothy Harrison Eustis (1886–1946), dog breeder and philanthropist, who was founder of The Seeing Eye guide dog school
- Caroline C. Fillmore (1813–1881), wife of President Millard Fillmore; born in Morristown
- Nic Fink (born 1993), Olympic swimmer who specializes in breaststroke events
- Chris Fletcher (born 1948), former safety, played in the NFL for the San Diego Chargers, 1970–1976
- Steve Forbes (born 1947), editor-in-chief of Forbes and two-time Republican candidate for President of the United States
- Caroline Rose Foster (1877–1979), farmer and founder of Fosterfields, a working historical farm
- Justin Fox (born 1964), financial journalist, commentator and writer
- Adam Gardner (born 1973), singer, songwriter and guitarist of the band Guster
- Peter Gelderloos (born 1981/1982), anarchist and writer
- Samuel Hazard Gillespie Jr. (1910–2011), former U.S. Attorney for the Southern District of New York
- Justin Gimelstob (born 1977), professional tennis player
- Anna Harrison (1775–1864), First Lady of the United States, wife of President William Henry Harrison and grandmother of President Benjamin Harrison
- Tobin Heath (born 1988), United States national soccer team player, World Cup Champion and Olympian
- Alexander Hedge (born 1997), rower, who has represented the United States in competitions and won two gold medals at the 2023 Pan American Games
- Markus Howard (born 1999), player for the Marquette Golden Eagles men's basketball team
- Linda Hunt (born 1945), Academy Award-winning actress
- Julia Hurlbut (1882–1962), suffragist who served as the vice chairman of the New Jersey branch of the National Woman's Party
- Alexis McGill Johnson (born 1972), president and CEO of Planned Parenthood
- I. Stanford Jolley (1900–1978), film and television actor who starred in the 1946 serial film The Crimson Ghost
- Otto Hermann Kahn (1867–1934), German-born banker, investor, philanthropist and Rutgers University trustee maintained a home in Morristown
- Roger Wolfe Kahn (1907–1962), bandleader, composer, nightclub owner, aviator; Otto Kahn's son; born in Morristown
- Nolan Kasper (born 1989), World Cup alpine ski racer who competes in the technical events and specializes in the slalom
- Ann Klein (1923–1986), politician who served in the New Jersey General Assembly and was the first woman to run for Governor of New Jersey
- Anthony W. Knapp (born 1941), mathematician at the Stony Brook University working on representation theory who classified the tempered representations of a semisimple Lie group
- Ted Koffman (born 1944), politician who served in the Maine House of Representatives from 2000 to 2008
- Luther Kountze (1841–1918), banker who built an estate in Morristown in the late 1880s
- Samuel Krimm (born 1925), physicist with a research focus in biophysics
- Dorothy Kunhardt (1901–1979), children's-book author, best known for the baby book Pat the Bunny.
- Connor Lade (born 1989), soccer player for New York Red Bulls
- Antoine le Blanc (c. 1800–1833), murderer
- Fran Lebowitz (born 1950), author, columnist and actor
- David Hunter McAlpin (1816–1901), industrialist and real estate owner in New York City
- Thomas N. McCarter (1824–1901), lawyer and state assemblyman
- Dimitri Minakakis (born 1977), former singer for mathcore band The Dillinger Escape Plan
- Dave Moore (born 1969), former NFL tight end
- Liv Morgan (born 1994), professional wrestler and multi-time champion in the WWE
- Troy Murphy (born 1980), professional basketball player
- Walter Naegle (born 1949), artist, photography and civil rights activist, who was born in Morristown and was partner of Bayard Rustin
- Thomas Nast (1840–1902), caricaturist and editorial cartoonist; lived in Morristown for more than 20 years
- Craig Newmark (born 1952), founder of Craigslist; born in Morristown and attended Morristown High School
- Neil O'Donnell (born 1966), former NFL quarterback, most notably for the Pittsburgh Steelers
- John Panelli (1926–2012), football player who played in the NFL for the Detroit Lions and the Chicago Cardinals
- Sister Parish (1910–1994), interior decorator and socialite, most notably as the first interior designer brought in to decorate the Kennedy White House
- Doug Payne (born 1981, class of 2000), equestrian who competed for the United States at the 2020 Summer Games in Tokyo
- Sheila Pepe (born 1959), artist
- Mahlon Pitney (1858–1924), Associate Justice of the United States Supreme Court
- Johanna Poethig (born 1956), Bay Area visual, public and performance artist
- Debra Ponzek, chef, owner of Aux Délices restaurants in Connecticut
- Rick Porcello (born 1988), starting pitcher for the Boston Red Sox
- Andrew Prendeville (born 1981), professional automobile racer
- Sarah Price (born 1969), author
- Dan Quinn (born 1970), football coach
- Robert Randolph, guitarist, of Robert Randolph & the Family Band
- Rocky Rees (born 1949), head football coach at Shippensburg University of Pennsylvania, 1990–2010
- Garrett Reisman (born 1968), NASA astronaut, first American to be on board the International Space Station
- Rick Rescorla (1939–2001), head of Morgan Stanley World Trade Center security during the September 11 terrorist attacks
- Moshe Reuven, Hasidic rabbi, rapper, singer-songwriter
- Jordan Riak (1935–2016), activist against corporal punishment
- William P. Richardson (1864–1945), co-founder and first Dean of Brooklyn Law School
- Suzanne Scott (born 1965/66), CEO of Fox News
- Tony Scott (1921–2007), bebop clarinetist, arranger, New World music innovator
- Gene Shalit (1926–2026), film critic on NBC's The Today Show
- Alexander Slobodyanik (1941–2008), classical pianist
- Leila Clement Spaulding (1878–1973), classicist and archaeologist
- Lexington Steele (born 1969), pornographic actor, director and owner of Mercenary Motion Pictures and Black Viking Pictures
- W. Scott Stornetta (born 1959), physicist and scientific researcher
- John Cleves Symmes (1742–1814), delegate to the Continental Congress; pioneer responsible for the Symmes Purchase; father-in-law of President William Henry Harrison
- Kathryn Tappen (born 1981), sportscaster who works on NBC Sports Group's coverage of hockey and football
- Jahmar Thorpe (born 1984), professional basketball player for the Iwate Big Bulls in Japan
- Jyles Tucker (born 1983), linebacker for the San Diego Chargers
- Bayard Tuckerman Jr. (1889–1974), jockey, businessman and politician
- MJ Tyson (born 1986), jewelry designer
- Alfred Vail (1807–1859), inventor of Morse code
- Frederick T. van Beuren Jr. (1876–1943), physician and surgeon who was president of Morristown Memorial Hospital from 1933 until his death
- Tom Verlaine (1949–2023), songwriter, guitarist and lead singer for the New York rock band Television
- Daniel Spader Voorhees (1852–1935), New Jersey State Treasurer, 1907–1913
- John Beam Vreeland (1852–1923), attorney and politician who served in the New Jersey Senate and as the United States Attorney for the district of New Jersey
- Silas A. Wade (1797–1869), politician who served in the Michigan House of Representatives
- Joshua Weinstein (born 1983), independent filmmaker who directed the A24 film Menashe (2017) and the feature documentaries Driver's Wanted (2012) and Flying on One Engine (2008)
- George Theodore Werts (1846–1910), 28th Governor of New Jersey, 1893–1896; Mayor of Morristown 1886–1892
- Nancy Zeltsman (born 1958), jazz vibraphonist
