= Adams & Fairchild =

19th century grocery store in Morristown, New Jersey

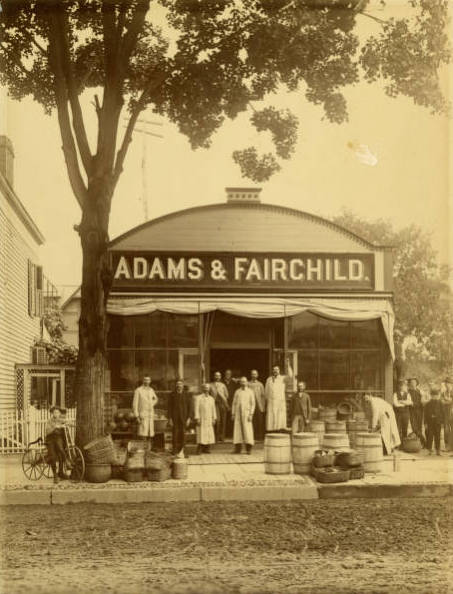
- Adams & Fairchild temporary building on 15 South Street in August 1886
- Founded: Unknown
- Headquarters: 20 Park Place, Morristown, New Jersey
- Number of locations: 0
- Area served: Morristown Green

Adams & Fairchild was a 19th century grocery store located beside the Morristown Green in Morristown, New Jersey. Circa 1882, it operated out of historic 1740s tavern, Arnold's Tavern, notable for its Revolutionary history.

When the Arnold's Tavern was relocated in 1886 by Julia Keese Colles, Adams & Fairchild created a temporary location nearby, then moved back into the newly constructed Hoffman Building atop the original site.

They are possibly the predecessor to circa 1920 Frank H. Fairchild Co. Fancy Grocers, which was located at 33, 37, and 39 South Street in Morristown.

== History ==
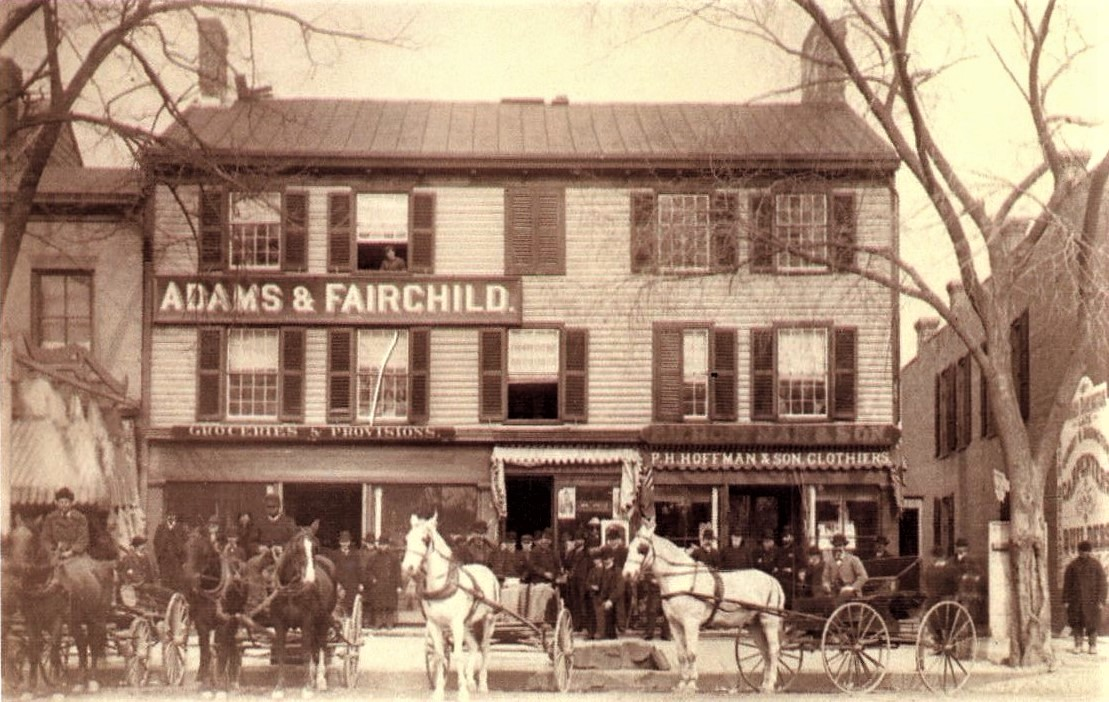
1886 photograph featuring the Arnold's Tavern storefront. "E. A. Van Fleet, H. H. Fairchild, and F. H. Fairchild are identified as standing behind [the carriages] on the left" while the Hoffmans stand on the right. Images of America: Morristown does not specify which carriages.

By 1882, Adams & Fairchild opened in the historic Arnold's Tavern beside P. H. Hoffman & Son Clothiers and the jewelry store of F. J. Crowell. According to building owner P. H. Hoffman, the grocery store was situated in the Tavern's original parlor. That year, Philip H. Hoffman was the owner of the building, along with Hampton O. Marsh. The second floor was rented out as apartments.

Contemporaneous farmer Caroline Foster recalled visiting the store in her youth. She described Fairchild as a little man "who had to jump to get to the top of the turn" of the coffee urn when grinding coffee, and Adams as a man who "always wore a little skull cap and white apron." She described the store and its cracker barrel in 1967:

[The] shelves were covered with various things like oatmeals and flour...in barrels and sugar in barrels and crackers. That was a very sanitary operation. And the clerk...would grab one, shake it out, and take crackers out in handfuls, and fill it up and put it on the scale, till he got a pound or two or whatever you wanted, and then roll it over and tie it up. Everybody dipped into the cracker barrel.

Fresh vegetables such as lettuce were not often available. Most often, its vegetable wares consisted of turnips, squash, carrots, pumpkins, potatoes, cabbage, celery, canned tomatoes, and canned peas.

=== Temporary relocation ===
In the spring of 1886, after Marsh's death, Hoffman "decided to remove the old building, and [erect] in its stead [the] Hoffman Building." Morristown historian and lecturer Julia Keese Colles purchased the building and moved it to her estate on Mount Kemble Road to prevent its demolition. That building then became All Souls' Hospital, managed by Morristown lawyer Paul Revere.

Circa August 1886, the Arnold's Tavern was moved to Colles's estate. During this time, Adams & Fairchild operated out of a temporary store across the Morristown Green on 15 South Street, while the Hoffman Building (supposedly named after Philip H. Hoffman) was under construction.

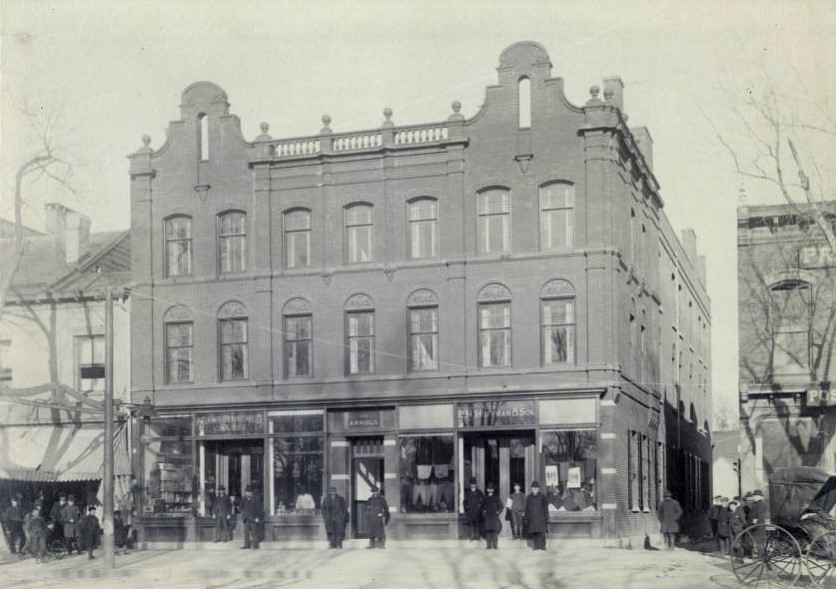
Adams & Fairchild operating out of the Hoffman building in 1897

=== Hoffman building ===
The Hoffman building was constructed by Philip H. Hoffman of P. H. Hoffman & Son Clothiers. John T. Allen was the carpenter for the Hoffman building.

In 1896, the Adams & Fairchild Grocers posted an advertisement in a Morris County directory stating their address as 20 N. Park Place in Morristown. It can be inferred that they had moved into the completed Hoffman building, built atop the original site of the Arnold's Tavern.
