= Hoffman Building (Morristown, New Jersey) =

Historic building in New Jersey

Coordinates: 40.79742°N 74.48180°W

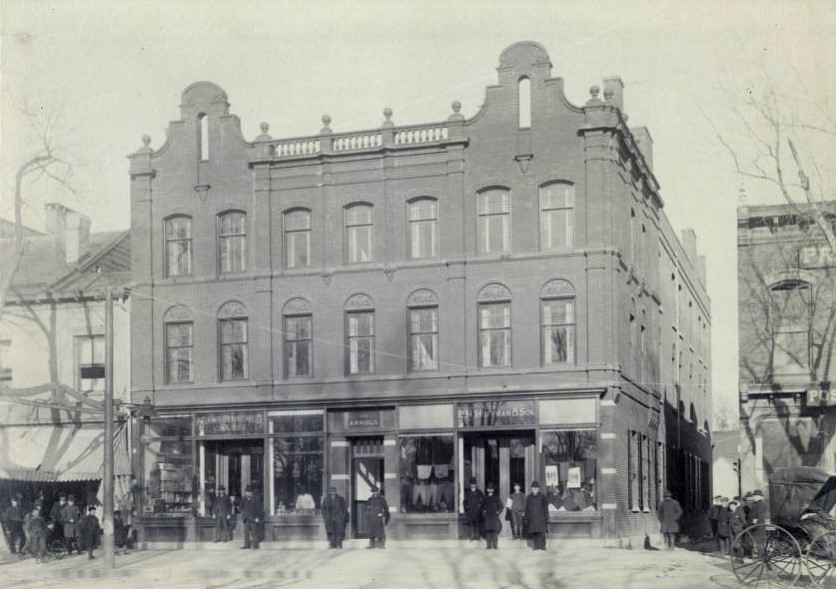
- The Hoffman Building in 1897, containing two ground-level stores: Adams & Fairchild grocers on the left, and P. H. Hoffman & Son clothiers on the right
- Interactive map of the Hoffman Building area

General information
- Location: Morristown, New Jersey, 20 North Park Place
- Completed: c. 1890s
- Demolished: c. 1960s
- Owner: Philip H. Hoffman

Design and construction
- Architect: John T. Allen

The Hoffman Building, also known as The Arnold, was a Morristown, New Jersey structure completed before 1896.

Located across the street from the Morristown Green, the three-story building housed retail and rental properties, most notably Adams & Fairchild grocers and P. H. Hoffman & Son clothiers. It was commissioned by Philip H. Hoffman, and its carpenter was John T. Allen.

The inscription above the entrance hall read "The Arnold," in homage to the Arnold's Tavern, the historic building moved to accommodate it.

It was demolished some time before the 1960s to make room for the Reynolds & Co building, in which a Charles Schwab location now stands.

== Architecture ==
The three-story building appeared to have two Dutch neck gables on either side, creating a symmetrical exterior that may recall the Western-style false front and Mission Revival architecture. The second floor's windows have arched pediments.

== History ==
=== 19th century ===
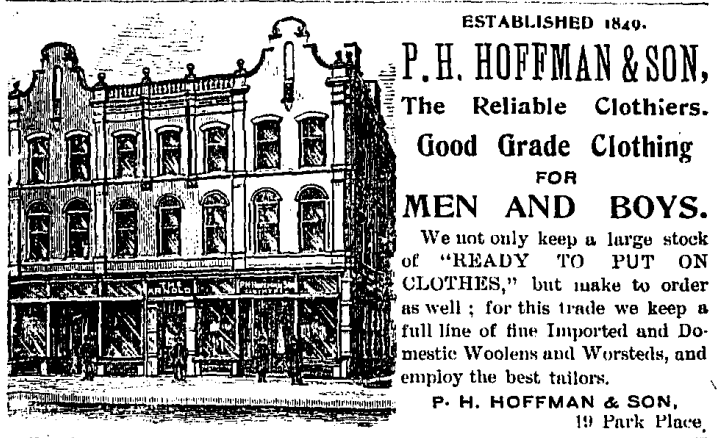
The Hoffman Building, illustrated in an 1897 P. H. Hoffman & Son advertisement

In 1849, Philip H. Hoffman established men's clothing store and tailoring shop P. H. Hoffman & Son.

By 1882, the Clothiers operated out of the historic Arnold's Tavern which also housed Adams & Fairchild Groceries and the jewelry store of F. J. Crowell as well as apartments. Circa 1882, Philip H. Hoffman owned the building, along with Hampton O. Marsh. In the spring of 1886, after Marsh's death, Hoffman "decided to remove the old building, and [erect] in its stead [the] Hoffman Building."

The Tavern's demolition was prevented by Morristown historian and lecturer Julia Keese Colles. To preserve the building, Colles arranged to move the building from the Morristown Green to her estate on Mount Kemble Avenue.

Some time before 1896, the building was completed. That year, former tenants Adams & Fairchild Grocers moved in and advertised their relocation back to 20 North Park Place. In 1899, D. Kantor photographed the Hoffman Building.

=== 20th century ===
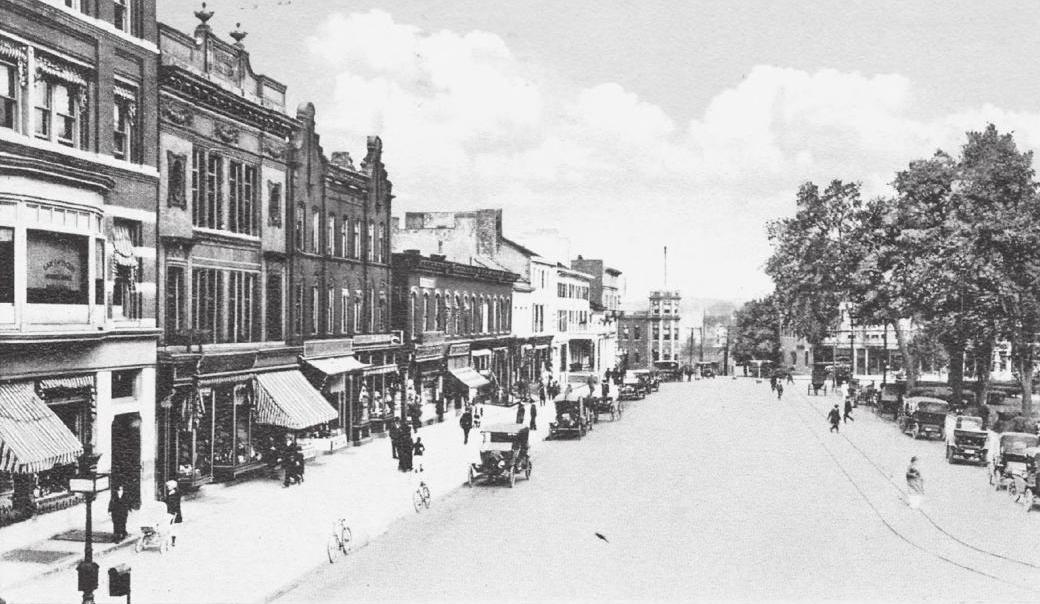
The Hoffman Building (third from left) in 1916. Across the street are trolley tracks and the Morristown Green.

As of 1904, the building was residential; a groom's family celebrated his wedding breakfast at his Hoffman Building home. That year, Sidney A. Baldwin, organist and musical director of the Morristown Church of the Redeemer, had her studio where she taught pianoforte in the Hoffman Building. Circa October 1910, Morristown resident Arthur Day had his bike stolen from the hall of the Hoffman Building. The Hoffman Building was still standing by 1923, when it housed Morristown Typewriter Service, a typewriter business by M. J. Conroy.

By the 1960s, the building and its two neighboring buildings on the left had been demolished; the source provides a photograph of the street for view. The Hoffman building and its two neighboring structures to the left became the site of the minimalist brick Reynolds & Co building, which circa 1960 housed the Jodo Gift Shop, S. S. Kresge Company, and Rogers Clothing.

By 2022, the Reynolds & Co building had become a Charles Schwab location.
