= Arnold's Tavern =

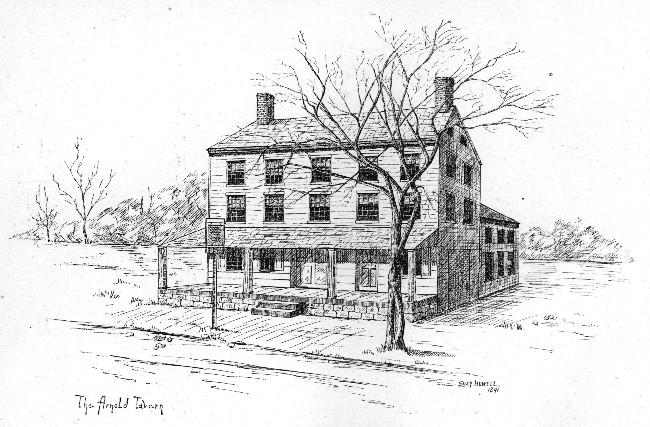
- Circa 1893 illustration of Arnold's Tavern by Suzy Howell

General information
- Location: 20 North Park Pl. (1740s–1886); Mt. Kemble Avenue (1886–1918)
- Opening: 1740s
- Destroyed: 1918 (fire)

Jacob Arnold's Tavern, also known as the Old Arnold Tavern and the Duncan House, was a historic tavern located in Morristown, New Jersey, established by Samuel Arnold circa 1740. Before the building was moved in 1886, it was located on the Morristown Green. In 1777 it served as George Washington's headquarters during the Revolutionary War, and it was the site of Benedict Arnold's first trial in 1780. The National Park Service claims "Much of [Morris]town's social, political, and business life was conducted at Arnold's Tavern" during the Revolutionary era.

Starting in 1863, the building was leased out as a retail and apartment property. In 1886, Morristown historian Julia Keese Colles moved the building to her estate on Mt. Kemble Avenue in Morristown, to prevent its demolition and to make way for the Hoffman Building.

In 1891, after its move to Mt. Kemble Avenue, it was expanded to become the site of All Souls' Hospital, operated by lawyer Paul Revere, great-grandson of the Revolutionary War figure by the same name. In 1918, the building was destroyed in a fire.

== History ==
=== 18th century ===
In 1750, at the age of 24, Samuel Arnold (father of Jacob Arnold) erected the Tavern himself near the west side of the Morristown Green. The original building was "a small establishment," a "stout building with a wide front porch, a rabbit warren of tight rooms and smoky fireplaces...[with] bare wooden floors." At that time, the Green was a "grazing area for cattle, sheep, and horses." The Tavern was located beside "the Morris County courthouse and jail [and] the Presbyterian and Baptist churches." The town had about 250 inhabitants at this time.

Samuel Arnold's son was Revolutionary War colonel Jacob Arnold, paymaster and commander of the light-horse militia of Morris County, NJ under George Washington. He refers to himself as the "commanding officer of Jersey troops" in a 1781 letter.

In 1764, Samuel Arnold died at 38 years of age. Jacob Arnold inherited his father's Tavern, but his mother Phoebe Arnold assigned landowner Thomas Kinney to manage the farm until 1775, due to Jacob's young age. Jacob Arnold became its innkeeper/proprietor in 1775. He collaborated with Thomas Kinney to build the slitting mill at Speedwell. He later served as the Sheriff of Morris County.

During the Revolutionary War, from January to May 1777, the Tavern was George Washington's headquarters while he received munition from Hibernia mines. Meanwhile, "his troops stayed in [locals]’ homes" and/or camped in the Loantaka Valley to the east. By that year, Arnold's Tavern had "sprouted an extension with a large public hall for dances." Washington convened councils in the hall, and allegedly designated himself an office and a bedroom on the Tavern's second floor. Morristown historian Julia Keese Colles states that the ballroom was "where [Washington] received his generals, Greene, Knox, Schuyler, Gates, Lee, de Kalb, Steuben, Wayne, [William] Winds, Putnam, Sullivan and others, besides distinguished visitors from abroad, all of whom met here continually during the winter of 1777." The innkeeper was Jacob Arnold at this time.

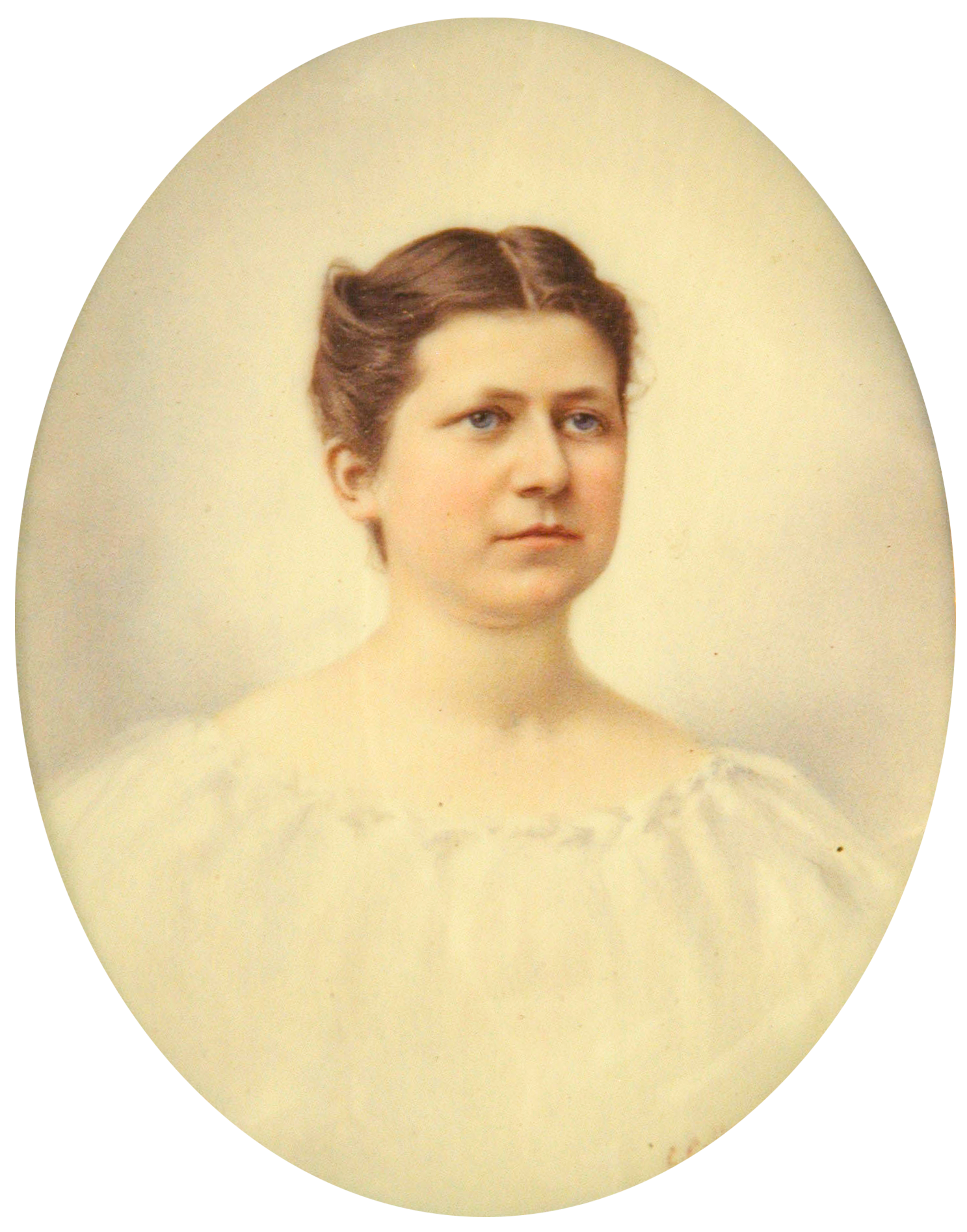
Portrait of Morristown historian Julia Keese Colles, who in 1886 moved the Tavern to her own property, to prevent its demolition.

In 1780, the Tavern was the place of Benedict Arnold's first trial.

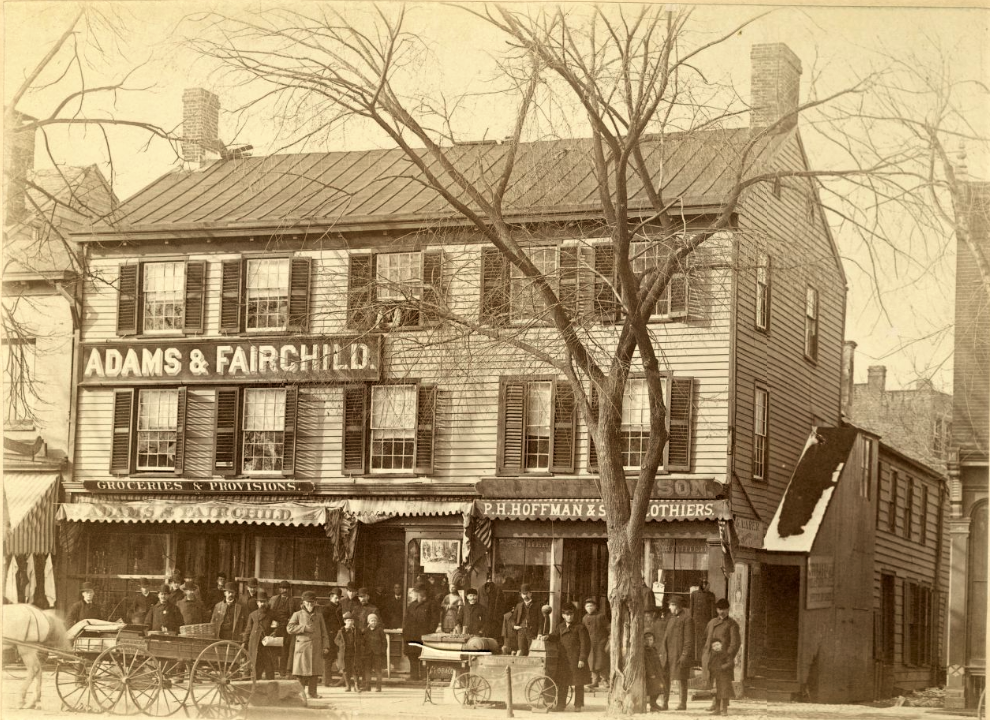
Arnold's Tavern photographed in 1886; by this time, it housed grocery store Adams & Fairchild and clothing store P. F. Hoffman & Son Clothiers.

=== 19th century relocation ===
In July 1863, Hoffman and Abraham L. Cross purchased the historic Arnold's Tavern in Morristown. They entirely remodeled it in the spring of 1864, creating "two handsome stores in the lower story." The upper stories were used as a boarding house known as the Losey House.

By 1882, the Tavern continued to stand in its original location. It housed three stores on its first floor: Adams & Fairchild Groceries, P. H. Hoffman & Son Clothiers, and the jewelry store of F. J. Crowell. That year, Philip H. Hoffman was the owner of the building, likely along with Hampton O. Marsh. The second floor consisted of apartments.

In the spring of 1886, after Marsh's death, Hoffman "decided to remove the old building, and [erect] in its stead [the] Hoffman Building." The Tavern's demolition was prevented by Morristown historian and lecturer Julia Keese Colles. To preserve the building, Colles arranged to move the building from the Morristown Green to her estate on Mount Kemble Avenue. One source claims it was "dragged by a team of twelve oxen." The Hoffman Building was completed by 1896.

In an unknown year, Colles renovated the Tavern into the "Colonial House," which was "a residence for summer boarders who came to Morristown as a vacation area." In 1890, the house was sold at a public auction, where it was purchased by the Catholic All Souls' Hospital Association to become the All Souls' Hospital.

In 1896, the Adams & Fairchild Grocers moved into the Hoffman Building, built atop the Tavern's original site.

Some time before the 1960s, the Hoffman Building and two adjoining neighbors to the left were demolished to make way for the Reynolds & Co building at 20 North Park Place. As of 2022, the Reynolds & Co building is now the site of a Charles Schwab location.

=== Conversion to hospital ===
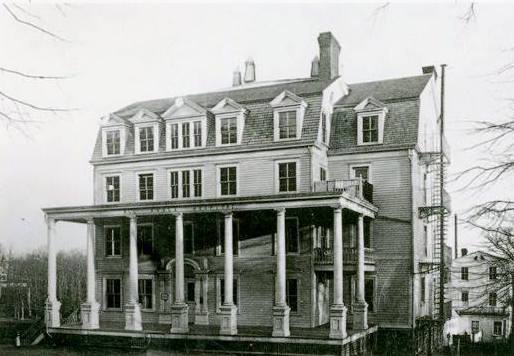
Arnold's Tavern after its relocation and conversion into the All Souls' Hospital.

On December 18, 1891, the All-Soul's Hospital opened, operating out of the historic tavern. Its chair was Morristown lawyer Paul Revere, great-grandson of American revolutionary figure Paul Revere, and son of Union General Joseph Warren Revere. According to Caroline Foster and Barbara Hoskins, "The ballroom was transformed into the chapel while the dining room was the hospital ward."

In 1893, Colles described the near-demolition and transition into the hospital:

The old [Arnold's Tavern] building with its many associations was about to be destroyed, when it was rescued, at the suggestion of the author of this book, and restored upon its present site on the Colles estate, on Mt. Kemble avenue, the old Baskingridge road of the Revolution. It has recently been purchased and occupied for a hospital by the All Souls' Hospital Association. Though extended and enlarged, it is still the same building and retains many of the distinctive features which characterized it when the residence of Washington. Here is still the bedroom which Washington occupied, the parlor, the dining-room and the ball-room where he received his generals, Greene, Knox, Schuyler, Gates, Lee, de Kalb, Steuben, Wayne, [William] Winds, Putnam, Sullivan and others, besides distinguished visitors from abroad, all of whom met here continually during the winter of 1777.

Before 1899, a second All Souls' Hospital building was constructed on the east side of Mt. Kemble Avenue.

The original, expanded Arnold's Tavern building was "destroyed by a fire" in April 1918.

== Legacy ==
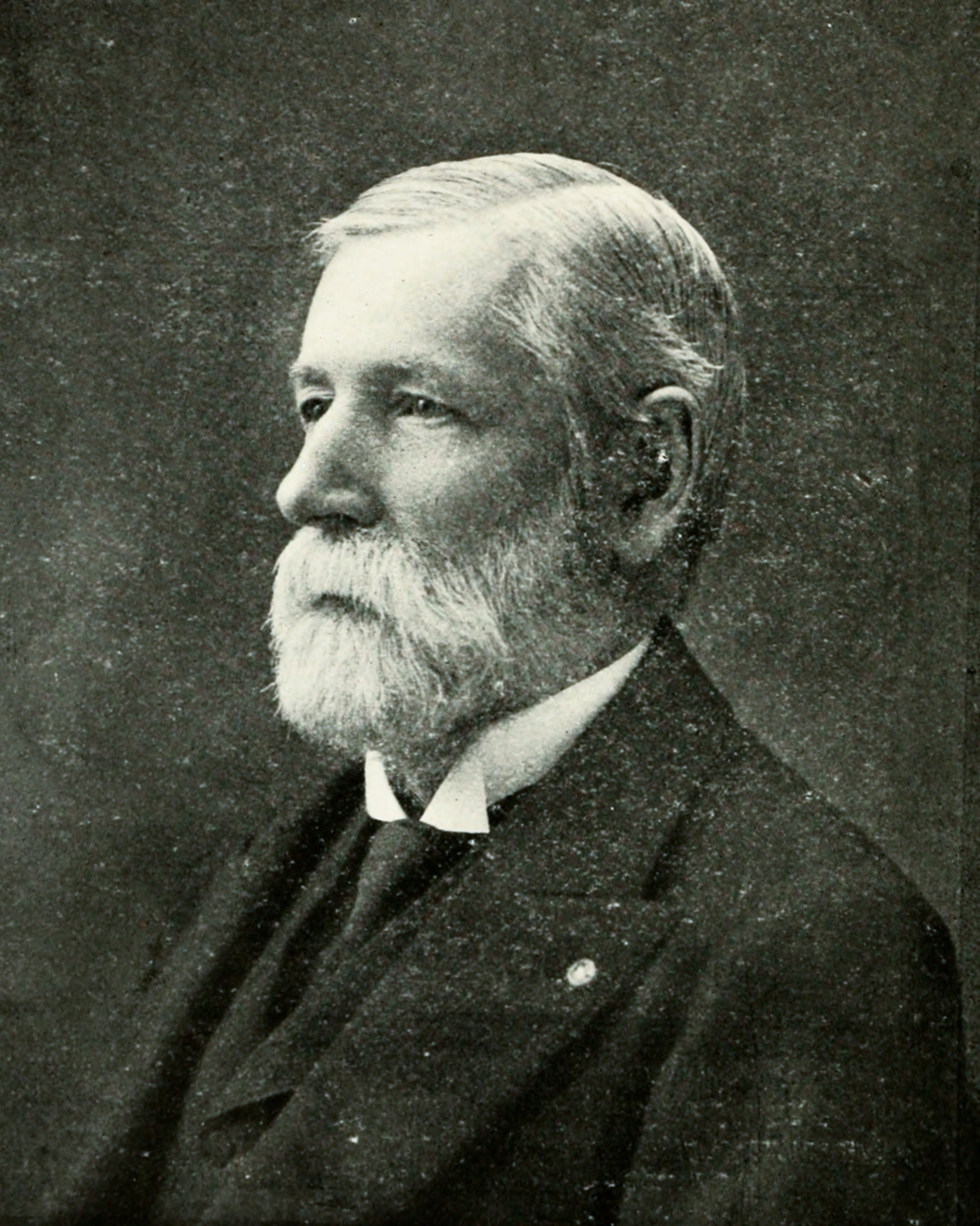
Philip H. Hoffman owned and operated business from the Tavern, replacing it with his Hoffman Building in 1886, and publishing a brief book about the Tavern in 1903

On September 10, 2017, the Morris County Historical Society at Acorn Hall featured the museum as part of its exhibit "The Cutting Edge: Medicine in Morris County."

In 1893, Julia Keese Colles described its Revolutionary War history and hospital conversion in her book, Authors and Writers Associated with Morristown: With a Chapter on Historic Morristown.

In 1903, Philip H. Hoffman (former retail tenant and owner, who replaced the Tavern with his Hoffman Building in 1886) compiled a roughly 50-page book about the Tavern's history from 1760 to 1903 in History of "The Arnold Tavern," Morristown, N.J. : and many incidents connected with General Washington's stay in this place, as his headquarters in winter of 1777: with views of historic buildings and places of Revolutionary interest.

In 1960, its history was described in Barbara Hoskin's and Caroline Rose Foster's nonfiction book, Washington Valley: An Informal History.

The building was the namesake of the "Road to Jacob Arnold's," a once-prominent road that is now an archaic road and part of Fosterfields.

== See also ==
- Morristown Green
- List of Washington's Headquarters during the Revolutionary War
