= All Souls' Hospital =

Catholic hospital based in New Jersey

- All Souls' Hospital Association
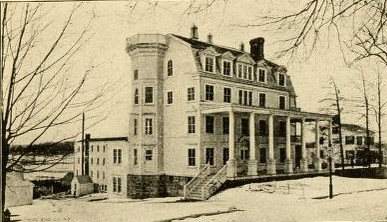
- The expanded Arnold's Tavern, moved to Mt. Kemble Avenue, served as its first location

Geography
- Location: Morristown, New Jersey, United States
- Coordinates: 40°47′23″N 74°29′21″W

Organization
- Religious affiliation: Catholic

Links
- Lists: Hospitals in New Jersey

The All Souls' Hospital was a Catholic hospital based in Morristown, New Jersey. It was run in part by the Grey Nuns of Montreal. Its founding chair was Paul Revere, lawyer, civic leader, and great-grandson of American revolutionary figure Paul Revere.

The hospital's goal was to "care [for] the diseased, disabled, and infirm, and [other such] charitable work."

Its Morristown location used the historic Arnold's Tavern building from the 1770s, which was moved from the Morristown Green to Julia Keese Colles's property. When a 1918 fire destroyed the Tavern, the Hospital was rebuilt across the street and continued to serve the community until the 1970s.

== History ==
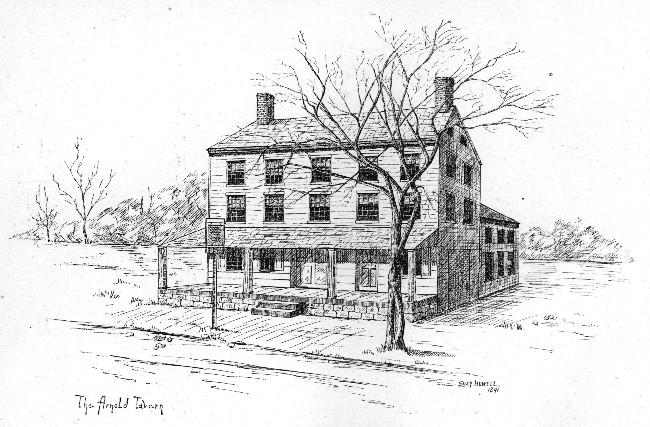
Arnold's Tavern before its expansion, 1893 illustration by Suzy Howell

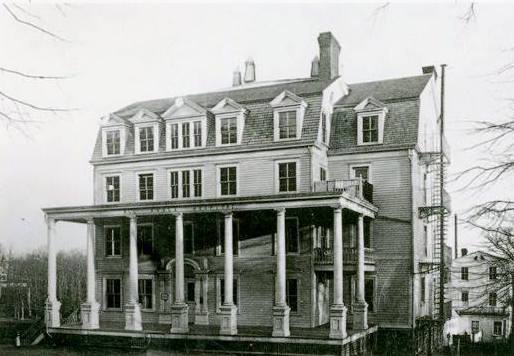
Expanded front view of All Souls' Hospital

=== Arnold's Tavern ===
Its Morristown location initially used the historic Arnold's Tavern building from the 1770s. Jacob Arnold's Tavern, originally located in the Morristown Green, was George Washington's winter headquarters from January to May of 1777 and the place of Benedict Arnold's first trial in 1780.

By 1882, the Tavern was owned by Philip H. Hoffman and Hampton O. Marsh, and multiple retail stores were in the Tavern. The stores were Adams & Fairchild, P. H. Hoffman & Son Clothiers (owned by Hoffman), and the jewelry store of F. J. Crowell.

That year, Philip H. Hoffman was the owner of the building, likely along with Hampton O. Marsh. In the spring of 1886, after Marsh's death, P. H. Hoffman "decided to remove the old building, and [erect] in its stead [the] Hoffman Building." As a result, Arnold's Tavern was scheduled for demolition. To preserve the building, Morristown historian Julia Keese Colles, a founding member of the Women's Board of the New Jersey Historical Society, arranged to move the building from the Morristown Green to her estate on Mt. Kemble Avenue.

In 1893, Julia Keese Colles described the near-demolition and transition into the hospital:

The old [Arnold's Tavern] building...has recently been purchased and occupied for a hospital by the All Souls' Hospital Association. Though extended and enlarged, it is still the same building and retains many of the distinctive features which characterized it when the residence of Washington.

Colles renovated the Tavern into the "Colonial House," which was "a residence for summer boarders who came to Morristown as a vacation area." After a few years, it was sold at a public auction in 1890, where it was purchased by the Catholic Church to become the All Souls' Hospital.

=== Hospital ===
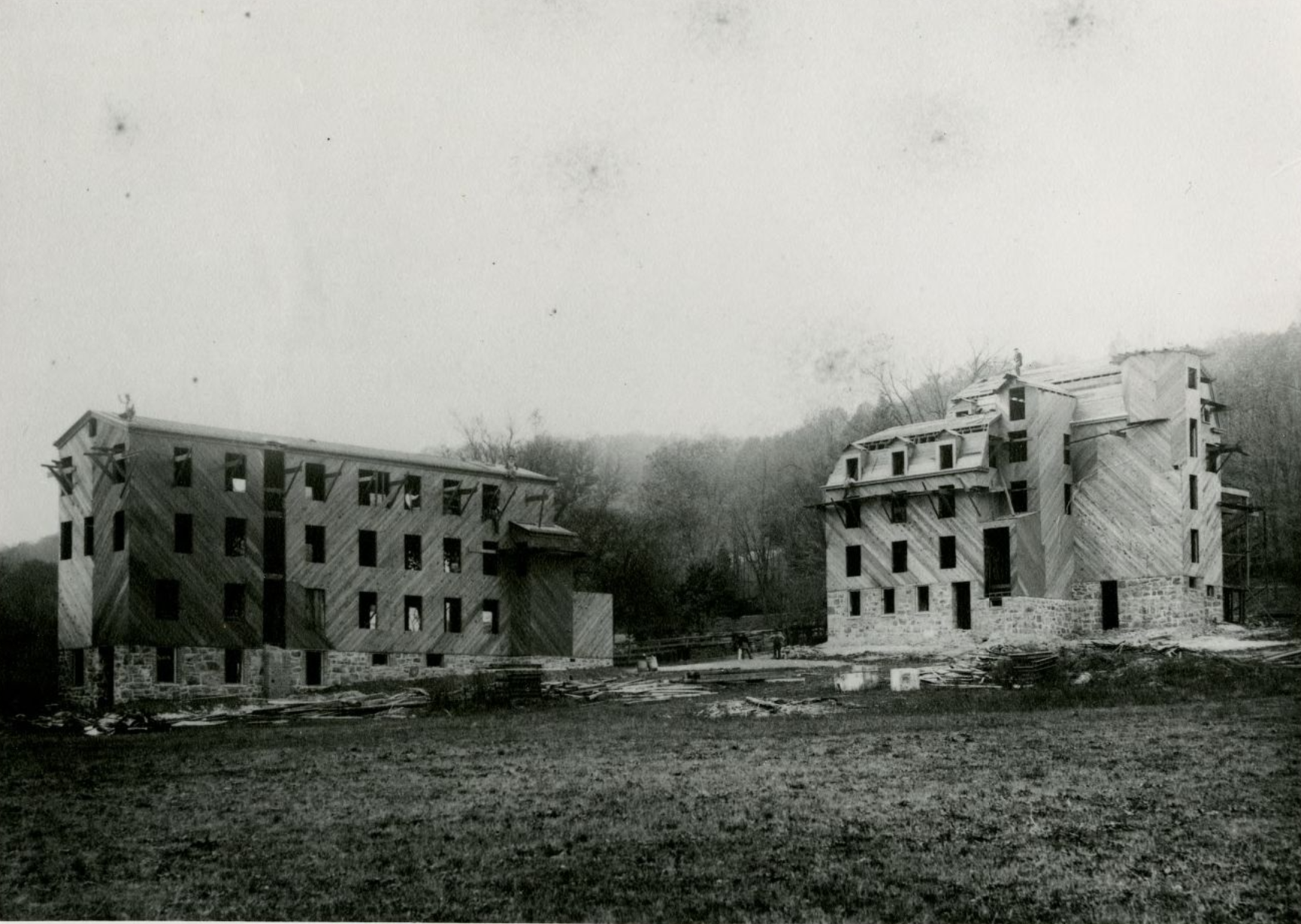
Construction or destruction of the All Souls' Hospital; unknown year.

On December 18, 1891, the All-Soul's Hospital opened, operating out of the historic tavern. Paul Revere, great-grandson of American revolutionary figure Paul Revere, was the founding chairman and president of the All Souls' Hospital Association. The Association was headquartered at Morristown with branches throughout various parishes, each of which was represented on the Board of Management.

According to Caroline Foster and Barbara Hoskins, "The ballroom was transformed into the chapel while the dining room was the hospital ward."

On January 4, 1892, a constitution and set of by-laws were discussed in a general meeting in Bayley Hall, Morristown.

In 1910, the late Augustus Lefebvre Revere (brother of hospital founder Paul Revere) gave the All Souls' Hospital in Morristown $10,000 as the Paul Revere Memorial Fund, to be used for the erection of a new building. 8 years later, the original Arnold's Tavern building burned down in a fire. Using A. L. Revere's donation, the hospital was rebuilt across the street, on the west side of Mt. Kemble Avenue, which connects to Route 202.

All Souls' was set to close because of financial difficulties in the late 1960s. In 1973, it became Community Medical Center. In 1977, the center became bankrupt and was purchased by the then new and larger Morristown Memorial Hospital, which is now the Morristown Medical Center.

The hospital was shut down in August 2019. It was briefly reopened during the height of the COVID-19 pandemic.

== Legacy ==
On September 10, 2017, the Morris County Historical Society at Acorn Hall featured the museum as part of its exhibit "The Cutting Edge: Medicine in Morris County."
