= Philip H. Hoffman =

American tailor nand banker

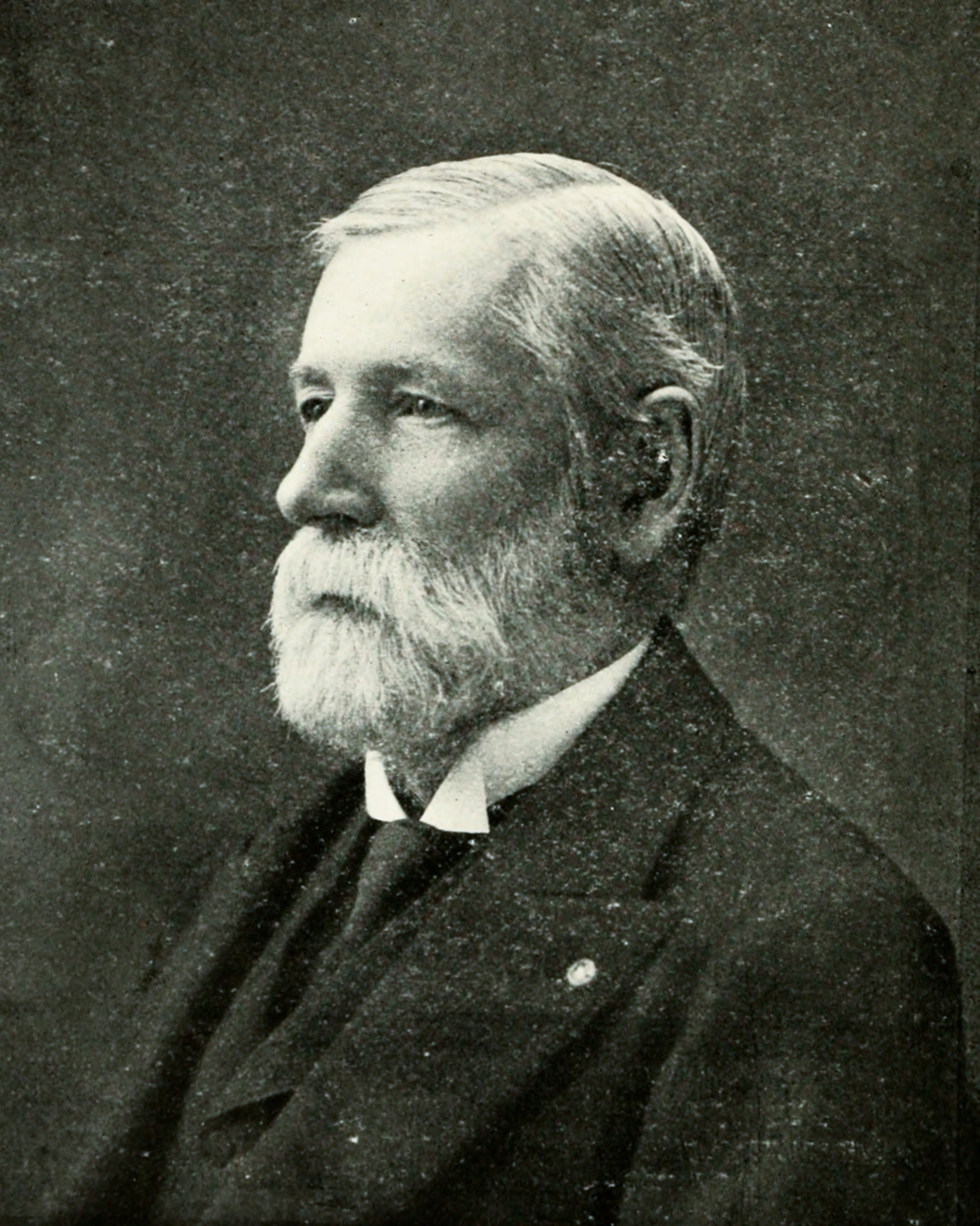
- Hoffman circa 1903.
- Born: Philip Henry Hoffman; July 28, 1827; Mendham, New Jersey
- Died: April 17, 1924 (aged 96); Mendham, New Jersey
- Occupation: Clothier
- Known for: P. H. Hoffman & Son Clothiers Owning the Arnold's Tavern Constructing the Hoffman Building
- Spouse: Barbara Ann Byram
- Children: 3

Signature
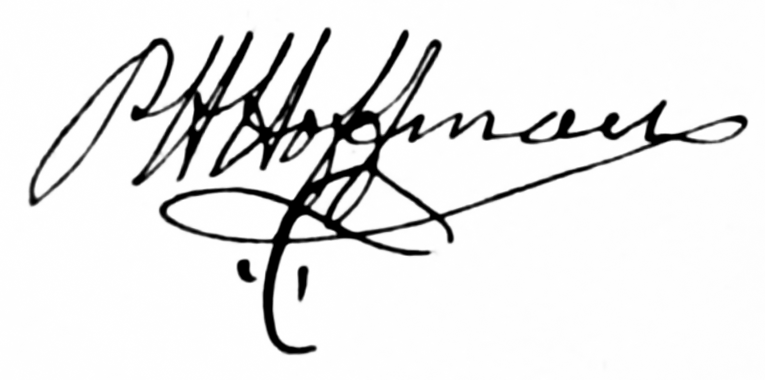

Philip Henry Hoffman (July 28, 1827 – April 17, 1924) was an American tailor, banker, and building owner in Morristown, New Jersey.

In July 1863, Hoffman was one of the purchasers of the historic Arnold's Tavern, in which he established men's tailor shop and dry goods store, P. H. Hoffman & Son.

In the spring of 1886, after the death of the building's co-owner, Hoffman "decided to remove the old building, and [erect] in its stead [the] Hoffman Building," a "more modern" building which was completed by 1896.

He was a member of the New Jersey Historical Society, the New Jersey Society of the Sons of the American Revolution, and Morristown Board of Education.

== Early life ==
Hoffman was born on his father's farm in Schooley's Mountain, New Jersey on July 28, 1827. While a child and teenager, he assisted his father in "the labors of field and meadow" and attended local schools. At the age of 18, he travelled to Morristown to apprentice for tailors and clothiers.

On October 1, 1849, Hoffman joined with S. B. Ryerson to create Hoffman & Ryerson, Dry Goods Merchants in Morristown, New Jersey. By 1850, the business had dissolved and Hoffman moved to Dover, New Jersey.

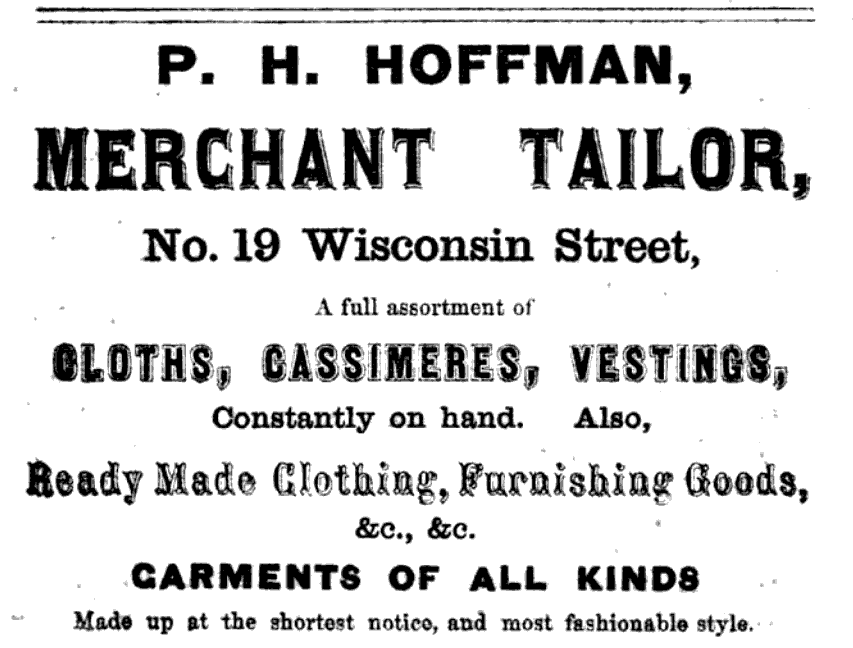
1856 advertisement from Hoffman's brief time working in Milwaukee, Wisconsin

In March 12, 1851, Hoffman was married to Barbara Ann Byram (1829–1897); she was a descendant of Pilgrim colonists of Bridgewater, Massachusetts.

The marriage brought three sons: Orlando, Henry, and Joseph. Orlando Kirtland Hoffman (1852–1853) died in infancy. Henry "Harry" Byram Hoffman (1854–1945), the second-born, would later join the P. H. Hoffman company to become P. H. Hoffman & Son.

They moved in March 1856 to Milwaukee, Wisconsin, where Hoffman engaged in business under P. H. Hoffman, Merchant Tailor at No. 19, Wisconsin Street. However, he suffered from ill health "occasioned by the change in climate." The family returned to Morristown in the fall of 1857.

That year, his last-born son was Dr. Joseph Reed Hoffman was born (1857–1893). He attended Morris Academy and High School and the Peddie Institute in Hightstown, New Jersey, and in 1883 graduated from the New York Homeopathic Medical College and built a "large and lucrative practice" in Morristown. On December 11, 1893, Joseph Reed Hoffman died after a brief illness of peritonitis, "highly esteemed by all who enjoyed his acquaintance."

== Career ==
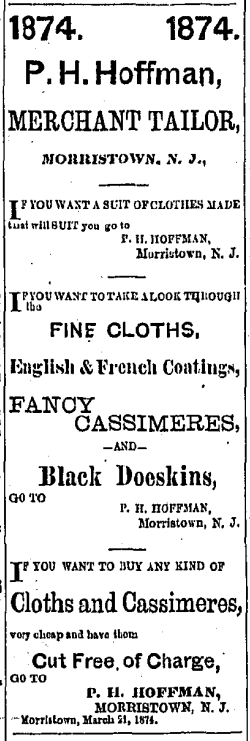
1874 advertisement in "The Iron Era"

In July 1863, Hoffman and Abraham L. Cross purchased the historic Arnold's Tavern in Morristown, best known for its 1777 history as George Washington's winter headquarters. They entirely remodeled it in the spring of 1864, creating "two handsome stores in the lower story." The upper stories were used as a boarding house known as the Losey House.

Contemporaneous Morristown farmer and historian Caroline Foster has stated,

Governor Randolph and the people of importance used to come up to Phillip Hoffman's to have their clothes pressed, and while they waited...they'd sit upstairs on the second floor to smoke and chat around the stove...Mr. Hoffman and the tailors would prepare the suit, press it, and take it up to them.

Circa 1864, under Cross & Hoffman, the two ran a clothing and dry-goods business in Morristown. Some time after 1866, Cross sold his interest and moved elsewhere. After Cross's departure, Hoffman continued to manage the store alone. An 1874 advertisement refers to the store as P. H. Hoffman, Merchant Tailor.

It was later renamed P. H. Hoffman & Son to honor Hoffman's junior partner, Henry Byram Hoffman, "his only surviving son."

As of 1882, Hoffman was a bank manager at Morris County Savings Bank (incorporated 1874). The Bank's other personnel were president Henry W. Miller; vice-president Aurelius B. Hull; and managers Augustus C. Canfield, Aurelius B. Hull, Henry C. Pitney, Charles Y. Swan, George E. Voorhees (likely of Voorhees Hardware, another Morristown Green store), James S. Coleman and Hampton O. Marsh, who owned the Arnold Tavern building with Hoffman.

== Later life ==
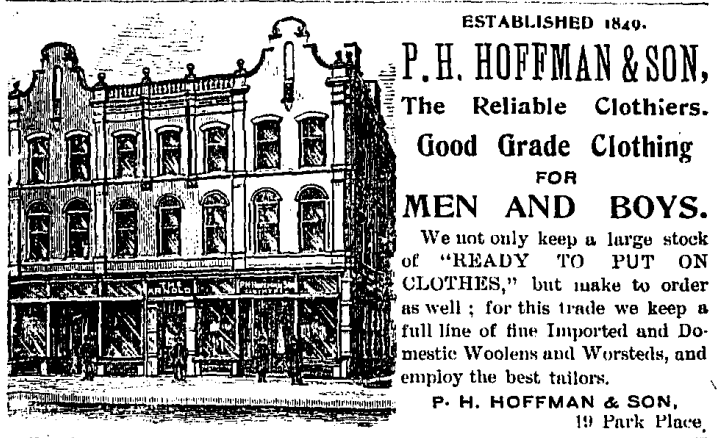
This 1897 advertisement for Hoffman's company also depicts The Arnold, a building he constructed.

From June 1848 to at least 1899, Hoffman "served as teacher, superintendent of the Sunday-school, trustee of the church, and ruling elder" of Morristown's South Street Presbyterian church. As a ruling elder, he represented the church in the presbytery, state synod, and U.S. general assembly. Circa 1889, Hoffman was the church's treasurer.

In 1903, Hoffman compiled a roughly 50-page book titled History of "The Arnold Tavern," Morristown, N.J., detailing the building's history since 1777 along with other structures near the Morristown Green.

In 1905, Dover newspaper The Iron Era reported that Hoffman was the vice president of Chester's Patriotic Order Sons of America. That year, he contributed photographs and illustrations of historic buildings to Andrew M. Sherman's 1905 book Historic Morristown, New Jersey, although it is not stated whether he collected them or created them himself.

In 1917, he was the subject of a brief biography in The Clothier and Furnisher titled "Ninety Years of Age, In Business Nearly Seventy." The article praises his modern reconstruction of the Hoffman Building, calling the historic Arnold Tavern building an "ancient front...gone to the scrap heap." The article praises Hoffman for his ability to conduct 68 years of business in one location; however, records indicate that P. H. Hoffman reestablished his business in multiple locations since 1849.

== See also ==
- Julia Keese Colles, contemporaneous Morristown historian who preserved the Arnold's Tavern from demolition
- History of Morristown, New Jersey
