= StudioEIS =

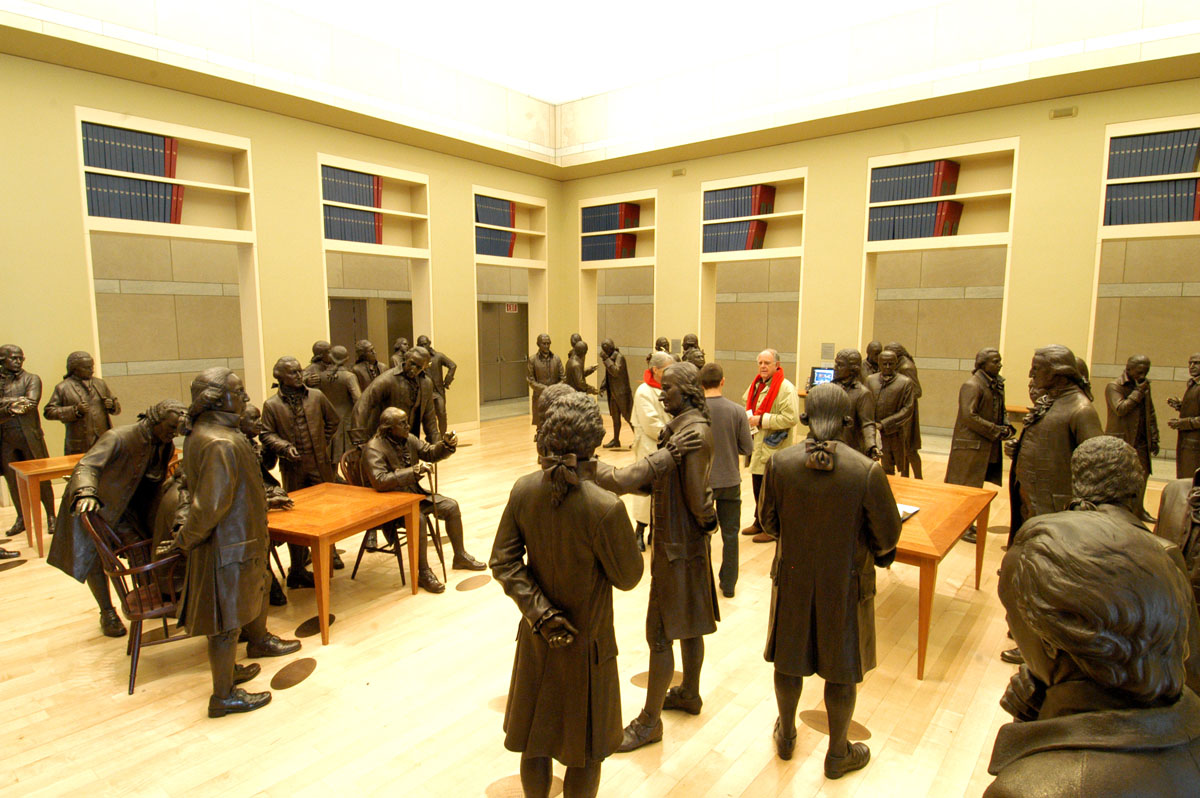
Some of the 42 signers of the U.S. Constitution at the National Constitution Center, Philadelphia.

StudioEIS (pronounced "Studio E-I-S") is a sculpture and design studio in Brooklyn, New York, United States. It specializes in classical figurative sculpture and visual storytelling with production in bronze, stone, and resin for exhibitions at cultural institutions, museums, and corporations worldwide.

== History ==
StudioEIS was founded in 1977 by New York City natives Ivan Schwartz (BFA Boston University College of Fine Arts) and Elliot Schwartz (BFA California Institute of the Arts, MFA Yale University). It pioneered the design and production of innovative figurative sculptures for use as visual storytelling elements within museum settings during the 1970s. When the company was founded there was growing resistance to using mass-produced mannequins for museum exhibitions. StudioEIS found a niche for itself in the world of narrative storytelling for museums and with the American Bicentennial at hand and a renewed interest in American history. Numerous museums were established across the country to address topics such as African American history, civil rights, Native American history and science & technology. This confluence of talent and need created the initial impetus for StudioEIS' work.

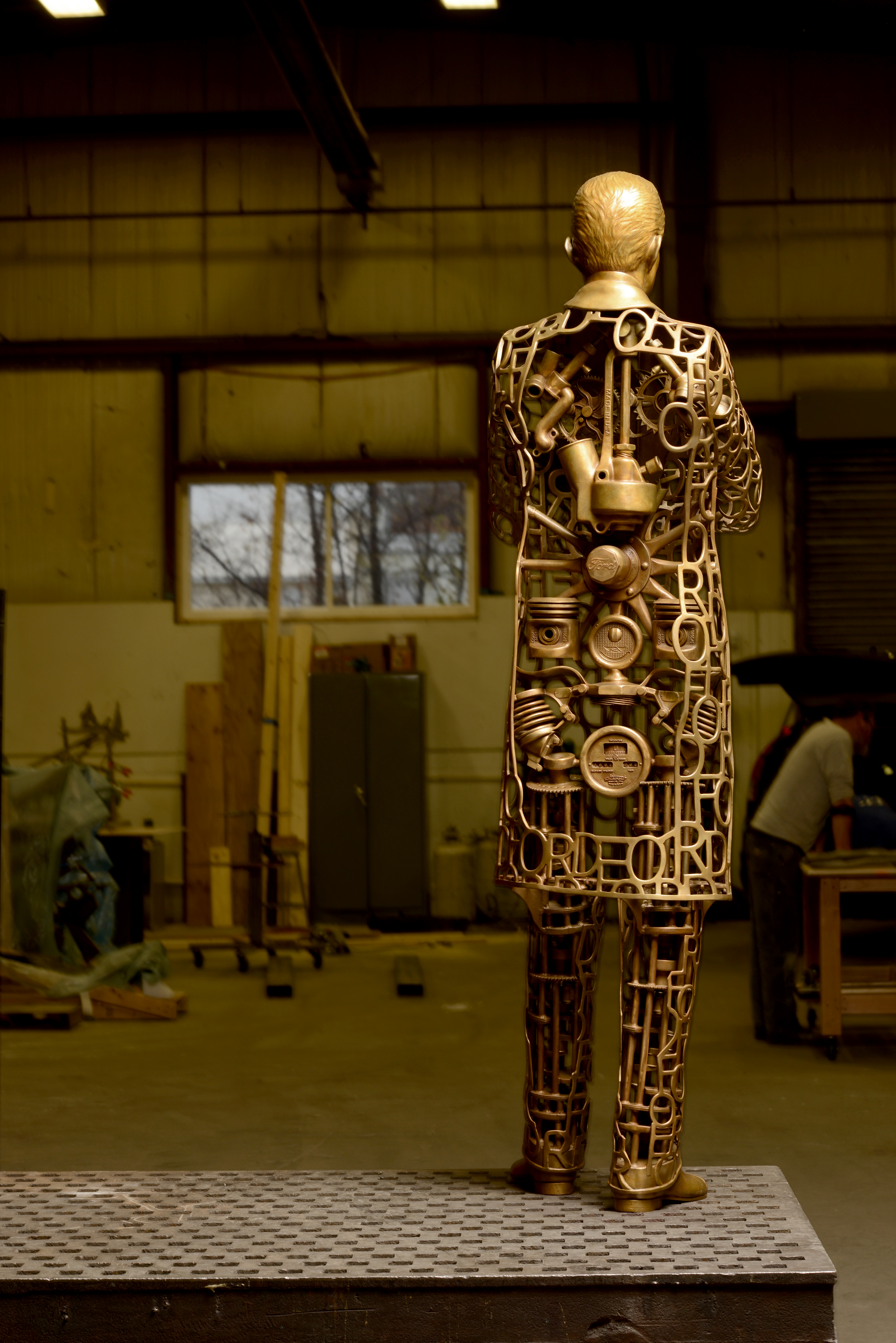
Foundry view of bronze Henry Ford for National Harbor, Maryland.

Museums large and small began out-sourcing displays via exhibition designers, and called upon StudioEIS to create lifelike sculptures to tell stories about American culture and its political history in vivid ways that put a face to history. StudioEIS' early commissions, for the National Civil Rights Museum and the American Museum of Natural History, were figurative, life-sized, and designed to engage the museum visitor.

With its growing reputation, StudioEIS began to work outside the museum world where innovative object making through visual storytelling was born. The studio now began to work with architects, industrial and scenic designers, restaurant designers & hotel and casino designers. Sony, the Bellagio Hotel and Casino in Las Vegas, Nike's flagship stores in Portland and Chicago, The Discovery Channel, and Martha Stewart Living are among its many corporate clients. StudioEIS' sculptures have been on display outside the United States in Mexico, Japan, Taiwan, Italy, Hong Kong, and Abu Dhabi.

The prominence of the studio grew as it became especially well known for its bronze portrait sculptures and public works, which have included sculptures of iconic figures, such as Franklin D. Roosevelt, Elvis Presley, Albert Einstein, Frederick Douglass and 42 bronze Founding Fathers at the National Constitution Center - which may be the largest bronze sculpture project of its type in American history. To date, StudioEIS has created more significant historical sculptures than any studio in American history.

The distinguished portrait sculptures created by StudioEIS are featured in important cultural institutions such as The Smithsonian's National Museum of African American History, The National WWII Museum in New Orleans, The Museum of the American Revolution in Philadelphia and The American Museum of Natural History in New York City. StudioEIS' expertise has been called upon for high-profile "forensic" reconstruction projects for George Washington's Mount Vernon Estate and Gardens, the exhibition "Written in Bone" at the National Museum of Natural History at the Smithsonian Institution and the exhibition JANE, Starvation, Cannibalism & Endurance at Jamestown for Jamestown and the Smithsonian's National Museum of Natural History.

Today StudioEIS' staff of sculptors, painters, costumers, researchers, and model-makers is enhanced by specialists in wax works, metal fabrication, and bronze casting. A project will often include collaboration with scholars in anthropology, costume history, and forensic science. The sculptures of George Washington at ages 19, 45 and 57 that were unveiled at Mount Vernon in 2006 involved state-of-the-art forensic research and computer reconstruction.

StudioEIS’ Archive resides at the Briscoe Center of American History at the University of Texas/Austin. The Archive was unveiled in November 2014.

== Notable works ==
=== American history ===
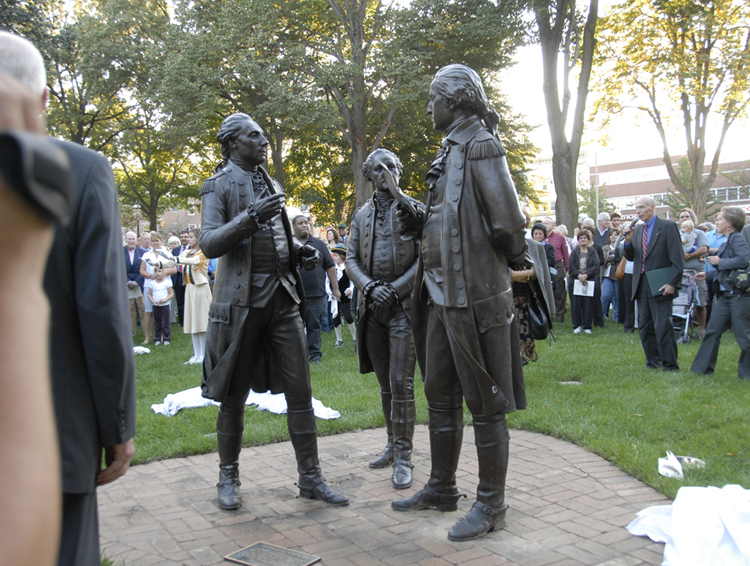
Washington, Hamilton and Lafayette, Morristown Green, Morristown, NJ (2007).

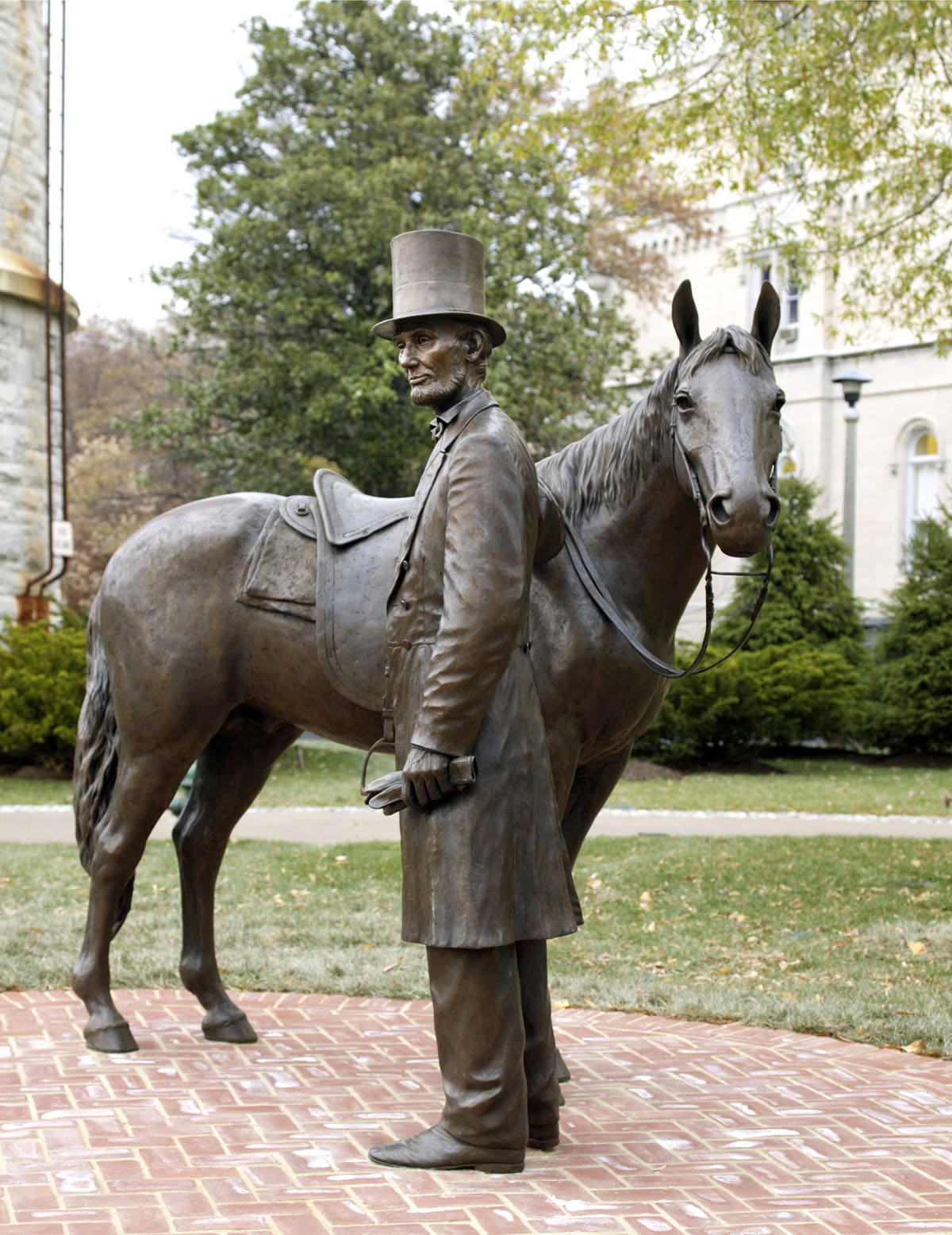
Lincoln and his horse, at the National Trust for Historic Preservation, President Lincoln's Cottage, Soldiers' Home.

- Virginia Women's Monument, Virginia State Capitol Grounds, Richmond VA - 2017 - 2020. Monument designed by StudioEIS and 1717 Design Group to honor the achievement of Virginia Woman in 10 Bronze Sculptures
- The Lucy Burns Museum, Lorton, Virginia - 2019. Larger than life figures of Lucy Burns, Alice Paul and Dora Lewis. Three suffragettes who were beaten and tortured for seeking the vote. This will commemorate the 100th anniversary of the imprisonment of Suffragists at the Lorton Workhouse.
- Museum of the American Revolution, Philadelphia, PA - April, 2017. 17 figurative sculptures representing the American Revolution including two portrait figures of the Peale brothers, Life size replica sculpture of King George III on his horse.
- Benjamin Franklin College, Yale University, New Haven, CT - 2017. Bronze sculpture of Benjamin Franklin
- National Museum of African American History and Culture, Smithsonian Institution, Washington, DC – 2016. 16 Portrait Sculptures for the new museum at the Smithsonian Institution
- New York Historical Society, New York City - 2011. Exterior bronze Sculptures of President Lincoln and Frederick Douglass
- American Revolution Museum at Yorktown, Yorktown, VA, 2016. 13 historical sculptures for the Jamestown Yorktown Foundation representing the American Revolution.
- John Jay College of Criminal Justice, New York City, 2014. Bronze sculpture of Chief Justice John Jay for the lobby of the college.
- The Maryland State House, Maryland Department of General Services in conjunction with the Maryland State Archives, Annapolis, MD, 2013. Bronze Sculpture of George Washington where he resigned his commission to Congress in the winter of 1783.
- American Museum of Natural History, Theodore Roosevelt Memorial Hall, 2012. Bronze sculpture of Teddy Roosevelt
- Virginia Capitol Foundation, Virginia Capitol, Richmond, VA, 2011. Larger than life bronze sculpture of Thomas Jefferson
- York College, Jamaica, NY, 2009. Tuskegee Airman for York College
- African American Burial Ground Interpretive Center, New York City, 2009. Sculptures depicting a moment in the history for New York's African American community.
- Gettysburg National Military Park, Gettysburg, PA - 2009. Bronze sculpture of Abraham Lincoln for the new Visitor Center
- Thomas Jefferson's Monticello, Charlottesville, VA - 2009. Bronze sculpture of Thomas Jefferson.
- Frederik Meijer Gardens and Sculpture Park, Grand Rapids, MI., 2008. Bronze sculpture of Lucius Lyon, 19th-century senator from Michigan
- Morristown Green, Morristown, NJ - 2007. Bronze sculptures of George Washington, Alexander Hamilton and the Marquis de Lafayette
- George Washington's Mount Vernon Estate and Gardens, Mount Vernon, VA - 2006. Forensically recreated wax sculptures of George Washington at ages 19, 45, and 57, plus four bronze portrait sculptures of George Washington, Martha Washington and their grandchildren
- National Constitution Center, Philadelphia, PA - 2001. Forty-two bronze sculptures of the signers of the U.S. Constitution
- North Carolina Museum of History, Raleigh, NC - 2001. Historical bronze portrait sculptures
- Truman University, Kirksville, MO, 2001. Bronze portrait figure of Harry S. Truman
- Great Platte River Road Memorial Archway Museum, Kearney, Nebraska, 2000. Sixteen historical sculptures and two oxen
- Lowell Heritage State Park, Lowell, MA - 1984. Sixteen 18th-century sculptures depicting life in Lowell, where the Industrial Revolution began in America
- Iron Range Interpretive Center, Hibbing, MN - 1977. Six figures from the late 18th century depicting the social life of the workers on the Iron Range

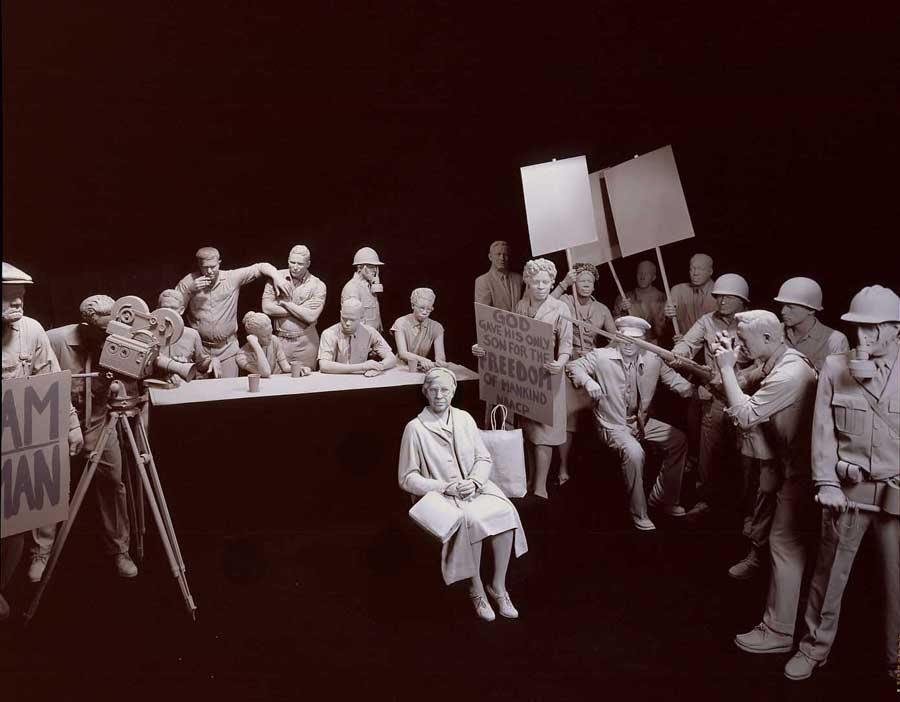
National Civil Rights Museum, Memphis, TN (1991).

=== Social and cultural history ===
- The Henry Ford Estate at Fair Lane, Dearborn, MI, 2017. Bronze sculptures of Henry and Clara Ford
- The Edsel & Eleanor Ford House, Grosse Pointe Shores, MI, 2014. Bronze sculpture of Edsel & Eleanor Ford, for the grounds of the house.
- Museum of the Bible, Washington, DC, 2017. Sculptures of Galileo, Isaac Newton and George Washington Carver.
- Autry National Center of the American West, Los Angeles, CA, 2010. Figurative Sculptures: Women's History of the West
- The National Civil Rights Museum, Memphis, TN - 1991. Twenty-seven sculptures representing the history of the Civil Rights Movement from 1955 through 1968
- Elvis Presley sculpture, Honolulu, HI - 2007. Bronze
- Motown Cafe, Orlando, FL - 1998. 56 sculptures of Motown recording artists
- Oakland Museum, Oakland, CA – 1997. Historical sculptures for the "Art of the Gold Rush" and sculptures for the exhibition "California: A Place, A People, A Dream"
- Birmingham Civil Rights Institute, Birmingham, AL - 1992. Fifteen sculptures depicting moments from the Civil Rights Movement

=== Anthropology ===
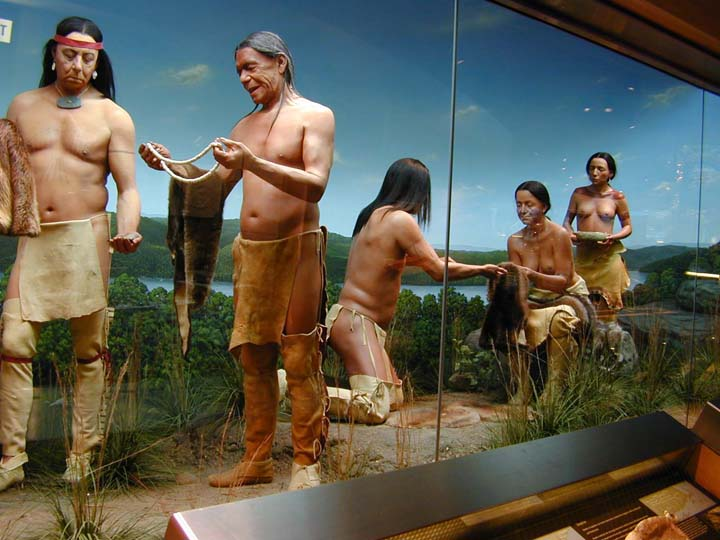
Members of the Mashantucket Pequot Tribe at the Mashantucket Pequot Museum and Research Center, Mashantucket, CT (1997).

- Peabody Museum of Natural History, Yale University, New Haven, CT - 2002. Six sculptures and cast dwellings on the history of Machu Picchu for the exhibition "Unveiling the Mystery of the Incas".
- Mashantucket Pequot Museum and Research Center, Mashantucket, CT - 1997. One hundred eleven realistically painted Native American sculptures representing the history of the Mashantucket Pequot Tribe
- Milwaukee Public Museum - Native American Project, Milwaukee, WI - 1999. Thirty-six painted sculptures of Pow-wow dancers.
- American Museum of Natural History, New York, NY, 1990. Construction of "King Mbunza," a completely articulated fiberglass sculpture for the artifact display in the "African Reflections" exhibit.
- Anchorage Historical and Fine Arts Museum, Anchorage, AK - 1985. Thirty-five sculptures representing the indigenous peoples of the region.

=== Presidential libraries and sites ===
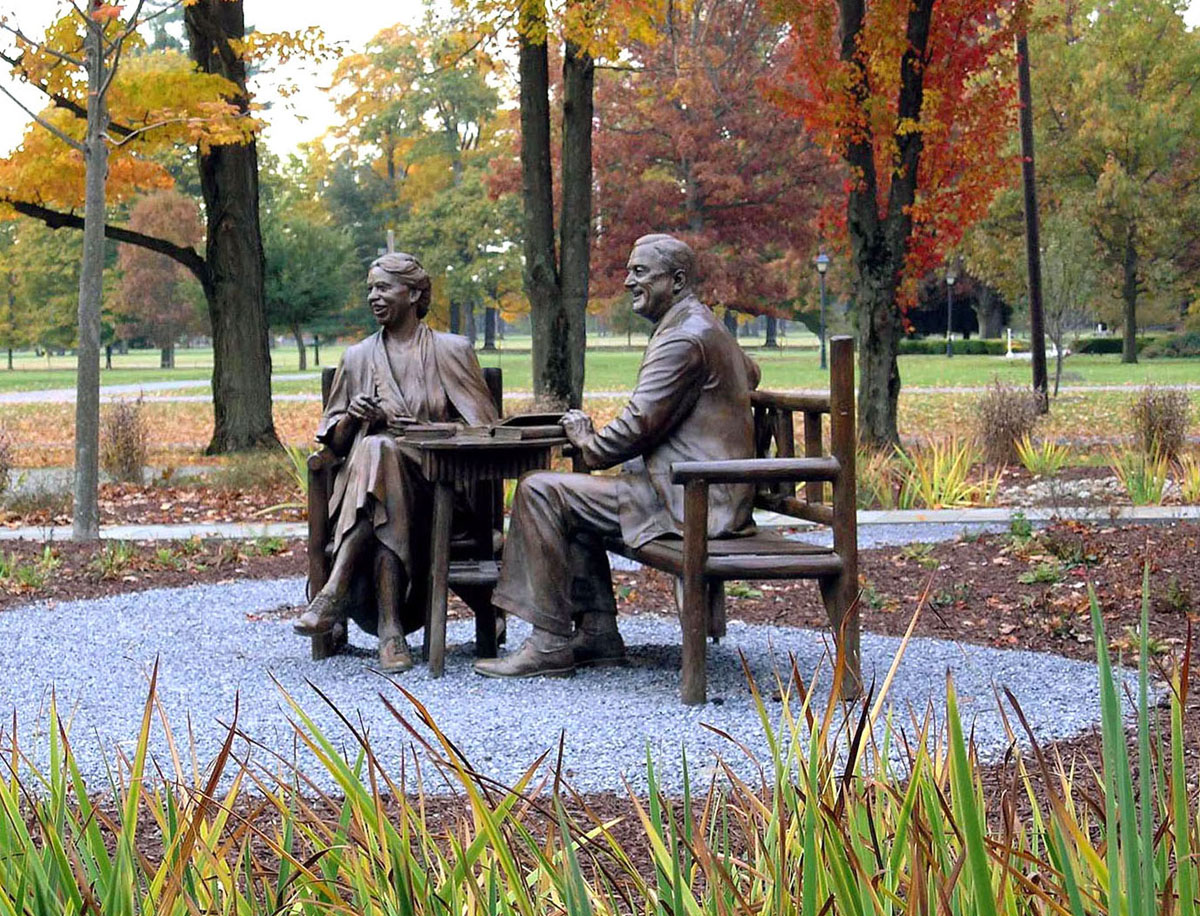
Franklin and Eleanor Roosevelt, FDR Presidential Library, Hyde Park.

- Ulysses S. Grant Presidential Library, Mississippi State University, MS - 2017. Four portrait sculptures of Grant as a Cadet, General, President and Elder Statesman.
- James Madison's Montpelier, Montpelier Station, VA - 2009. Bronze sculptures of James Madison and Dolley Madison
- National Trust for Historic Preservation, President Lincoln's Cottage at the Soldiers' Home, Washington, DC - 2009. Bronze sculpture of Abraham Lincoln and his horse
- George H.W. Bush Presidential Library and Museum, College Station, TX - 2006. Bronze portrait sculpture of George H.W. Bush, SR.
- Franklin Delano Roosevelt Presidential Library and Museum, Hyde Park, NY - 2003. Bronze portrait sculptures of Franklin Roosevelt and Eleanor Roosevelt
- Richard M. Nixon Presidential Library and Birthplace, Yorba Linda, CA - 1990, 2002. Portrait sculptures of Richard Nixon and Zhou Enlai for a traveling exhibit; ten portrait sculptures of world leaders who influenced President Nixon's life
- The Truman Library, Independence, MO - 2001. Bronze portrait figure of Harry S. Truman
- Lyndon B. Johnson Presidential Library and Museum, Austin, TX - 1991–1994. World War II sculptures

=== Sports history ===
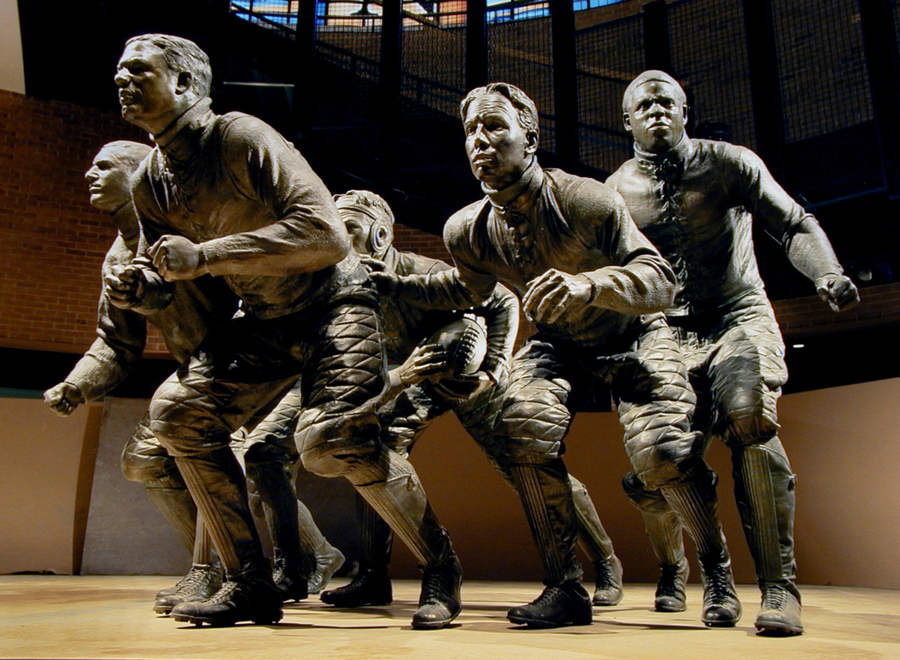
"Flying Wedge," National Collegiate Athletic Association Museum, Indianapolis, IN (1999).

- San Francisco 49ers Hall of Fame, Santa Clara, California - 2017. Portrait Sculpture of Tom Rathman
- NASCAR Hall of Fame, Charlotte, NC - 2009. Portrait sculptures of the founders of NASCAR
- Yankee Stadium Museum, New York, NY - 2009. Fiberglass sculptures of Don Larsen and Yogi Berra from the "1956 Perfect World Series Game"
- National Collegiate Athletic Association Museum, Indianapolis, IN - 1999. 35 athletic figures, including six bronze sculptures of the "flying wedge," for the new headquarters of the NCAA
- The Puerto Rico Museum of Sports, Guaynabo, Puerto Rico - 2002–2011. Portrait sculptures of renowned athletes such as Roberto Alomar, Diego Lizaedi, Carlos Ortiz, Roberto Clemente, Rafael Ramirez, Crissy Fuentes, Gigi Fernandez and many other athletes.
- Legacy Soccer Foundation, Orlando, FL - 2004. Bronze soccer player to commemorate the 10th anniversary of the World Cup

=== Military history ===
- Museum of the American Revolution, Philadelphia, PA, 2019. 2 realistically painted sculptures of military figures for the exhibition, Redcoat & Revolutions.
- National Museum of the United States Army, Fort Belvoir, VA, 2014 - 2019. 10 sculptures representing two campaigns in the history of the United States Army.
- National Infantry Museum, Fort Benning, GA – June 2009. Fifty sculptures depicting the history of the U.S. Infantry
- National Museum of the Marine Corps, Quantico, VA - 2006. Seventy-four realistically painted sculptures of Marine Corps figures
- US Army Aviation Museum, Fort Rucker, AL - 2005. Bronze sculptures
- Wisconsin Veterans Museum, Madison, WI - 1992. Over sixty sculptures of military figures from the American Revolution to the Vietnam War

=== Science and technology ===
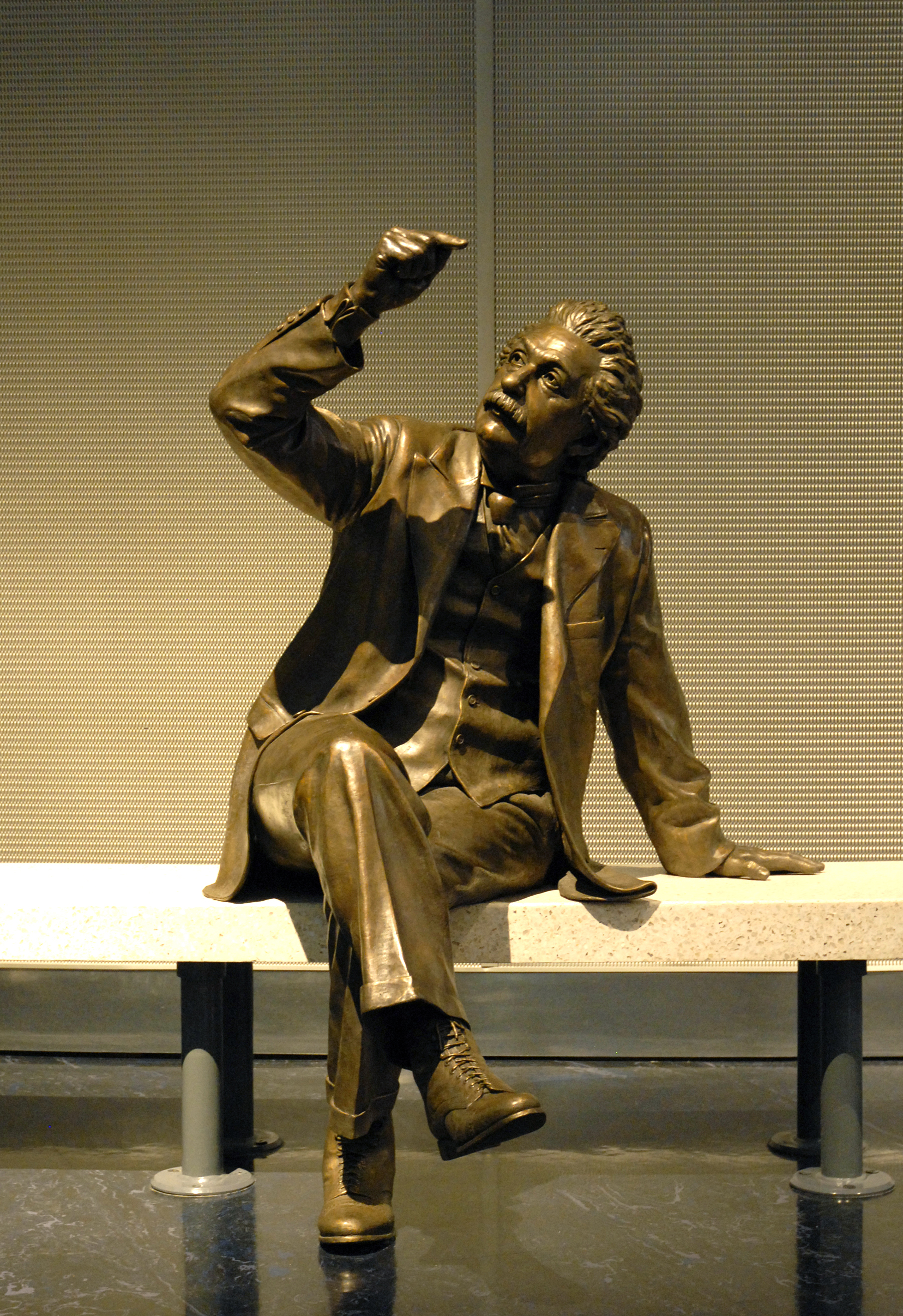
Albert Einstein at the Griffith Observatory, Los Angeles, California (2006).

- National Museum of Natural History, Smithsonian Institution, Washington, DC - 2009. "Written in Bone: Forensic Files of the 17th Century Chesapeake." Forensic recreation sculptures.
- Museum of Science and Industry, Chicago, Illinois, 2009. Historical figure of train engineer
- Griffith Observatory, Los Angeles, California - 2006. Bronze portrait figure of Albert Einstein
- Virginia Air and Space Museum Center, Hampton Roads Historical Center, Hampton Roads, Virginia - 1991. Thirty sculptures of historical and contemporary figures
- National Air and Space Museum, Smithsonian Institution, Washington, DC - 1978-1983 - Life-size portrait of Benjamin Franklin with reproduction of the clothing worn to celebrate the ascension of the Montgolfier Balloon in Paris in 1783; three sculptures for "The Golden Age of Flight," a racing tableau
- Kansas Cosmosphere and Space Center, Hutchinson, Kansas, 1994. 4 Portrait heads of the astronaut Thomas P. Stafford.

=== Public works ===
- American Way – National Harbor – National Harbor, MD, 2016, 2017. 9 bronze sculptures including: Abraham Lincoln, Frederick Douglass, George Washington, Rosie the Riveter, FDR, Eisenhower, Churchill, Louis Armstrong and Henry Ford for the plaza.
- City of Smithtown, Smithtown, New York, 2014, Bronze sculpture of Richard Smith, founder of Smithtown, NY
- Great American Project, Liberty, MO, ongoing beginning in 2012. Bronze sculptures of Mark Twain and George Washington and Susan B. Anthony

== Publications ==
- Kennewick Man: The Scientific Investigation of an Ancient American Skeleton. Written by Douglas W. Owsley 2014.
- The 9,000-Year-Old Man Speaks, Kennewick Man. Written by Douglas Preston for the Smithsonian Magazine, 2014
- JANE, Starvation, Cannibalism, and Endurance at Jamestown. Written by James Horn, William Kelso, Douglas Owsley, Beverly Straube, 2013
- Their Skeletons Speak; Kennewick Man and the Paleoamerican World Written by Sally M. Walker, Douglas W. Owsley, 2012
- The Many Faces of George Washington: Remaking a Presidential Icon. Written by Carla Killough McClafferty, 2011
- Written in Bone: Buried Lives of Jamestown and Colonial Maryland. Written by Sally M. Walker, 2009
- The National Constitution Center. Written by Michael Les Benedict, John Bogle, 2007
- The Letters of Pierce Butler, 1790–1794. Edited by Terry W. Lipscomb, 2007
- Cincinnati Sculpture Unveiled: The Story Behind the Art Written by Randy Centner & Philip Farr, 2006
- Watching the World Change: The Stories Behind the Images of 9/11. Written by David Friend, 2006
- US Postage Stamp "To Form A More Perfect Union" Commemorative Stamps. United States Postal Service, 2005
- The American National Tree, National Constitution Center. Biographies from an exhibit, 2004
- Mashantucket Pequot Museum & Research Center. Written by Theresa Hayward Bell, Jack Campisi, Steve Dunwell, 2000
- The National Civil Rights Museum Celebrates Everyday People. Written by Alice Faye Duncan, 1995
- World War II: Personal Accounts Pearl Harbor to V-J Day: A Traveling Exhibition Sponsored by The National Archives and Records Administration, 1992. Written by Gary A. Yarrington

== Lectures ==
- Gettysburg Foundation, Gettysburg, Pennsylvania, 2019. "Symbols, Myths & History" with Ivan Schwartz
- President Lincoln's Cottage, Washington, DC, 2018. "Statues of Limitations" with Ivan Schwartz
- Metropolitan Club, Washington, DC, 2010. "Picturing History" with Ivan Schwartz
- National Trust for Historic Preservation, President Lincoln's Cottage, Washington 2010. "Picturing History" with Ivan Schwartz
- Gettysburg National Military Park, Gettysburg, PA, 2010. "Conversation with Ivan Schwartz", Director of StudioEIS
- Montgomery College, Takoma Park, MD, 2009. "StudioEIS and the Art of Visual Storytelling, Two new sculpture of Abraham Lincoln"
- Washington College, Chestertown, MD, 2006
- Marymount College, New York, NY, 2006
- Lower East Side Tenement Museum, New York, NY, 2000
- U.S. Army Museums Conference, Fort Leonard Wood, MO, 1998. Conference "Thinking Outside the Box"
- Exhibit Design, World Symposium, Chicago, IL, 1998
- The University of Minnesota School of Architecture, 1976

== Architecture and design ==
- UPS, TV Commercial, New York, NY, 2010 - Larger than life replica of wooden mannequin foot
- Nurai Island Residence, Abu Dhabi, UAE, 2008 - 25 architectural models representing unique limited edition beach front villas developed by Zaya Real Estate Corporation
