= Julia Keese Colles =

American historian and writer

Julia Keese Nelson Colles
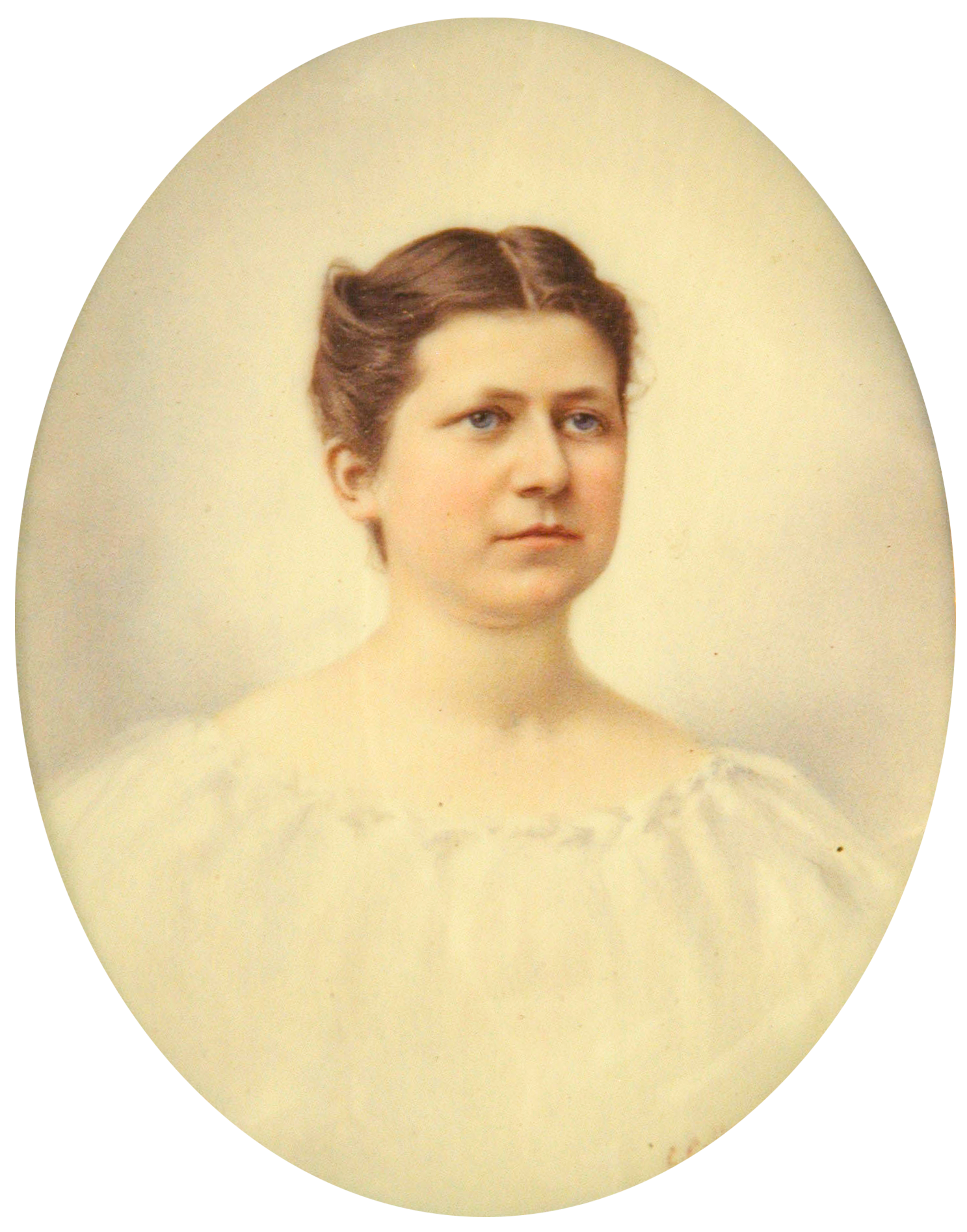
- Posthumous miniature portrait of Colles, painted by her daughter, artist and suffrage activist Gertrude Colles.
- Born: 1840
- Died: 1913 (aged 73)
- Spouse: George Wetmore Colles (1867–1886)
- Parents: Julia Ann Keese; John Peter Nelson

Julia Keese Nelson Colles (1840–1913) was an American historian, lecturer, and writer who lived in and studied Morristown, New Jersey.

In 1893, she published a collection of Morristown, New Jersey history in Authors and Writers Associated with Morristown. Colles also helped found the women's branch of the New Jersey Historical Society, and served as the chair of social science at Rutgers Female College in New York City. She was also a member of the Women's Town Improvement Association, and the American Historical Association.

She gave educational lectures in private homes in Morristown, New Jersey. She gave in-depth lectures focused on the lives of famous literary figures, including Shakespeare, Spenser, Coleridge, Byron, Milton, Goethe, and Chaucer. Other topics included German literature, Russian literature, drama, the art of conversation, Alfred the Great, Marie Antoinette, Martha Washington, Marie Louise, and Hortense de Beauharnais.

== Personal life ==
In 1840, Julia Keese Nelson was born in New Orleans, Louisiana to Julia Ann Keese and wealthy plantation owner John Peter Nelson.

In 1857, she graduated from the Abbott Collegiate Institute for Young Ladies, a school founded by Gorham Dummer Abbott.

On October 16, 1867, Julia Keese Nelson married George Wetmore Colles, whom she had met via her father's business. They were married in Poughkeepsie, New York. The couple had two daughters and one son: portrait artist and suffrage activist Gertrude Colles (1869–1957), poet and engineer George Wetmore Colles Jr. (1871–1951) and Barnard College physics teacher and Columbia doctoral candidate Julia Nelson Colles (1876–1903). The couple separated in 1886, after which George left for New York. Meanwhile, Colles retained custody of her children and continued to live in Morristown.

Circa 1902, the Morris Social Directory lists Colles and her children living at 20 High Street in Morristown.

Colles's letters to her friend, the Morristown playwright Sophie Radford de Meissner, are stored in the Colles Family Papers, Box 4, Folder 37, in the Morristown and Morris Township Library.

== Historical preservation ==
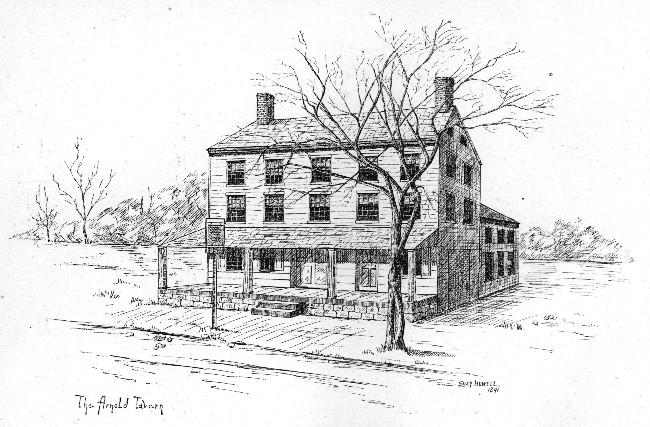
Colles prevented the demolition of the historic Arnold's Tavern, which was later converted into the All Souls' Hospital.

In 1886, the historic Arnold's Tavern was scheduled for demolition. Originally located in the Morristown Green, the building was George Washington's winter headquarters from January to May 1777 and the place of Benedict Arnold's first trial in 1780. To preserve it, Colles arranged to move the building from the Morristown Green to her estate on Mt. Kemble Avenue in Morristown, intending to enlarge the building to be used as a historic hotel. Colles briefly describes the acquisition in Authors and Writers Associated with Morristown.

In an unknown year, Colles renovated the Tavern into the "Colonial House," which was "a residence for summer boarders who came to Morristown as a vacation area." In 1890, the house was sold at a public auction, where it was purchased by the Catholic All Souls' Hospital Association to become the All Souls' Hospital on December 18, 1891.

In 1893, Colles published a collection of Morristown, New Jersey history in Authors and Writers Associated with Morristown: With a Chapter on Historic Morristown. The book was published by the Vogt Brothers in Morristown. Colles presented her books Authors Associated with Newark and A Forgotten Historical Nook to the New Jersey Historical Society, but neither was published.
