= Morristown Green =

Park in Morristown, New Jersey

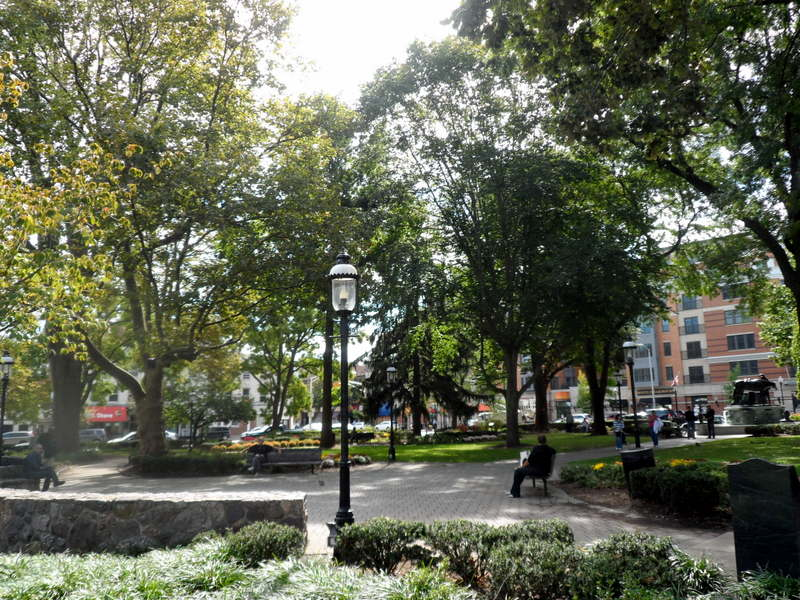
- Interactive map of Morristown Green
- Type: Village green
- Location: Morristown, New Jersey
- Coordinates: 40.7970°N 74.4811°W
- Area: 2.5 acres
- Established: 1715
- Website: www.morristourism.org/directory/the-morristown-green
- Morristown Green
- U.S. Historic district – Contributing property
- Part of: Morristown District (ID73001126)
- Designated CP: October 30, 1973

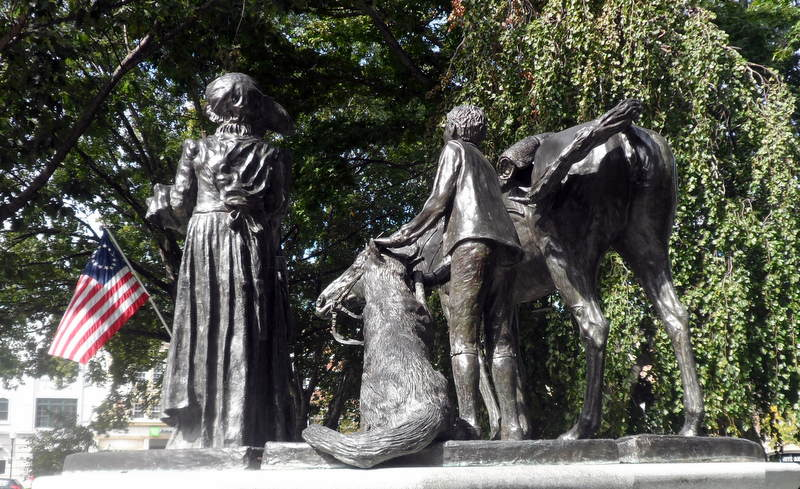
"Patriots' Farewell" Fountain -- a Revolutionary War monument on the Green.

Morristown Green, most commonly referred to simply as the Green, is a historical park located in the center of Morristown, New Jersey, United States. It has an area of two and a half acres, and has, in the past, served as a military base, militia training ground, and area for public executions. It is now a public park, within which many community events are held. It was added to the National Register of Historic Places, listed as a contributing property of the Morristown District, on October 30, 1973.

A map of walking paths on the Morristown Green is available.

== History ==
=== Lenape ownership ===
Around the year 1000, the Morristown area was inhabited by Munsee Lenape people. Circa 1500, Morris County was part of the Lenapehoking, i.e., modern-day New Jersey. Arrowheads found in Munsee encampments throughout the Washington Valley suggest that they hunted wolf, elk, and wild turkey for game and likely ate mussels from the Whippany River.

In 1757, colonists of the "New Jersey Association for Helping the Indians" forcibly relocated some 200 Lenape to Brotherton, New Jersey. In 1801, some members of the tribe voluntarily traveled to join the Oneidas' reservation in Stockbridge, New York after receiving an invitation from the Oneidas. However, Americans again expelled Lenape families in Stockbridge to Green Bay, Wisconsin in 1822.

=== English ownership ===
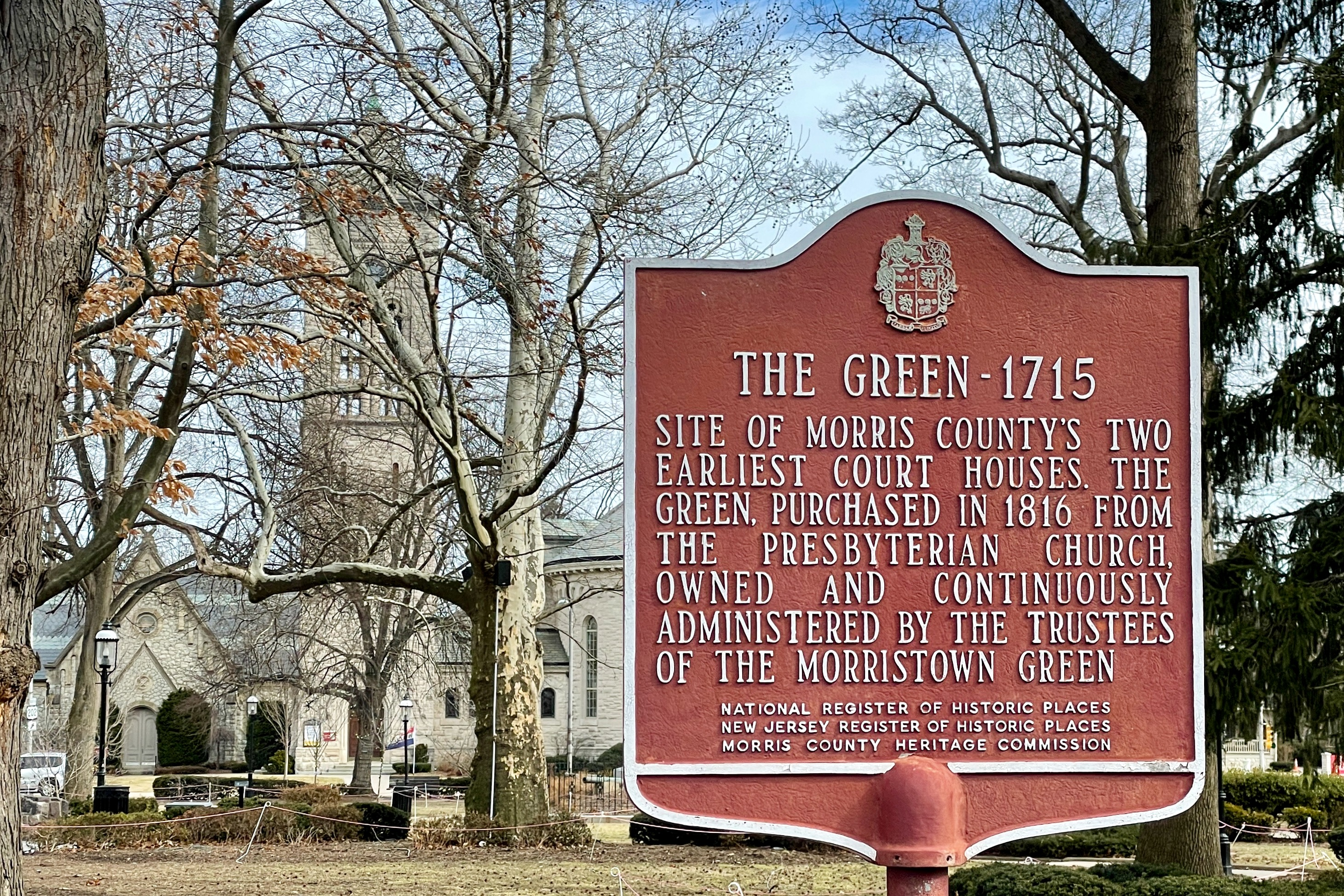
The Green – 1715, historical marker

According to a historical marker, the park was established in 1715. Throughout the 18th century, the Green was a "grazing area for cattle, sheep, and horses." The town had about 250 inhabitants at this time.

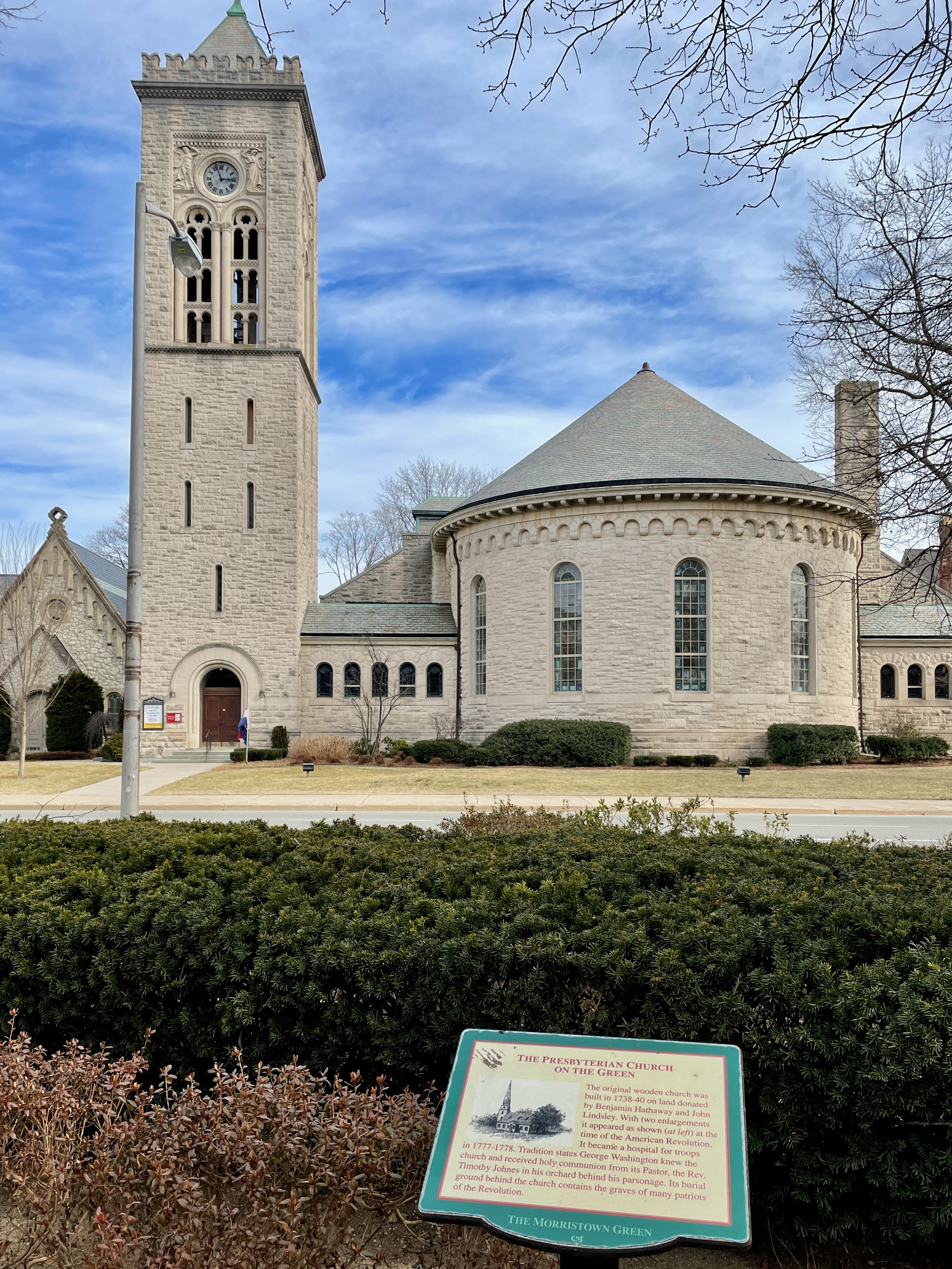
The Presbyterian Church on the Green

In 1731, the first burial took place in what is now the Presbyterian Church's historic graveyard. In 1733, Presbyterians began to gather for service at the Morristown Green. That year, the graveyard was officially founded. There were 1,640 burials on record (71 of which fought in the Revolutionary War). In 1738, King George II "issued the church a charter," and the Church structure was built sometime before 1742. That year, Reverend Timothy Johnes became its first pastor. From 1758 to 1816, the Green and some surrounding land was owned by the Presbyterian Church in Morristown.

Circa 1740, Samuel Arnold established the "famous" Arnold's Tavern on the North side of the park. The Tavern was located beside "the Morris County courthouse and jail [and] the Presbyterian and Baptist churches."

=== American ownership ===
During the Revolutionary War, from January to May 1777, the Arnold's Tavern was George Washington's headquarters, "while his troops stayed in [locals]’ homes" and/or camped in the Loantaka Valley to the east. By that year, Arnold's Tavern had "sprouted an extension with a large public hall for dances," which Washington used to convene councils. The National Park Service claims "Much of [Morris]town's social, political, and business life was conducted at Arnold's Tavern" during the Revolutionary era.

According to Simons, "the Green was the site of the Morris County Courthouse and jail for nearly 75 years (until 1827) and was the stage for many penal activities, including the incarceration of Tories and Hessian soldiers during the Revolutionary period".

In 1816, trustees of the Morristown Green purchased the land from the Morristown Presbyterian Church. The trustees pledged that the Green would remain "a common forever for the use and enjoyment of the public" and by the 1850s, efforts were made to revitalize the Green with tree plantings and fencing."

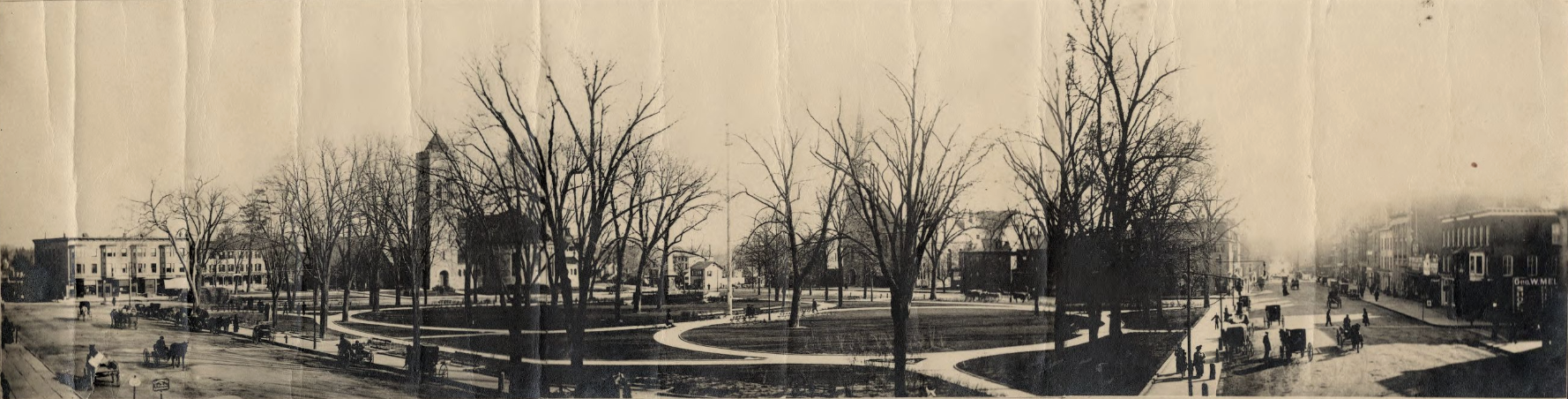
Morristown Green, panoramic view, circa 1910.

=== Executions ===
The Green was used as a public executions ground.

The last execution took place on September 6, 1833, of French immigrant Antoine Le Blanc, who was convicted of murder. Le Blanc worked as a farmhand on the farm of Samuel Sayre and his wife, despite living in a dark cellar and receiving no pay. On the night of May 11, 1833, he murdered the Sayres and their possibly enslaved servant Phoebe. Le Blanc then stole cash, jewelry, and clothing, and he attempted to escape via the Sayres' horse. That year, he was captured in a tavern at the Hackensack Meadows. Unspecified persons "returned [Le Blanc] to Morristown, tried, found guilty of murder, and sentenced to death by a jury. In addition to execution by hanging, Le Blanc was condemned by Judge Gabriel Ford to a post-execution medical dissection." The Jerseyman reported that 12,000 people attended his execution on the Morristown Green on September 6, 1833. People travelled from "Essex, Union, Somerset, Warren, Sussex and all other contiguous [counties]," and horses and wagons blocked the Green's roads for a mile in every direction. Many brought bagged lunches, presumably to picnic, and others sat on tall trees and rooftops for a better view. Among the attendees was judge Stephen Vail, creator of the Speedwell Ironworks, who later journaled about the experience.

=== Statues ===
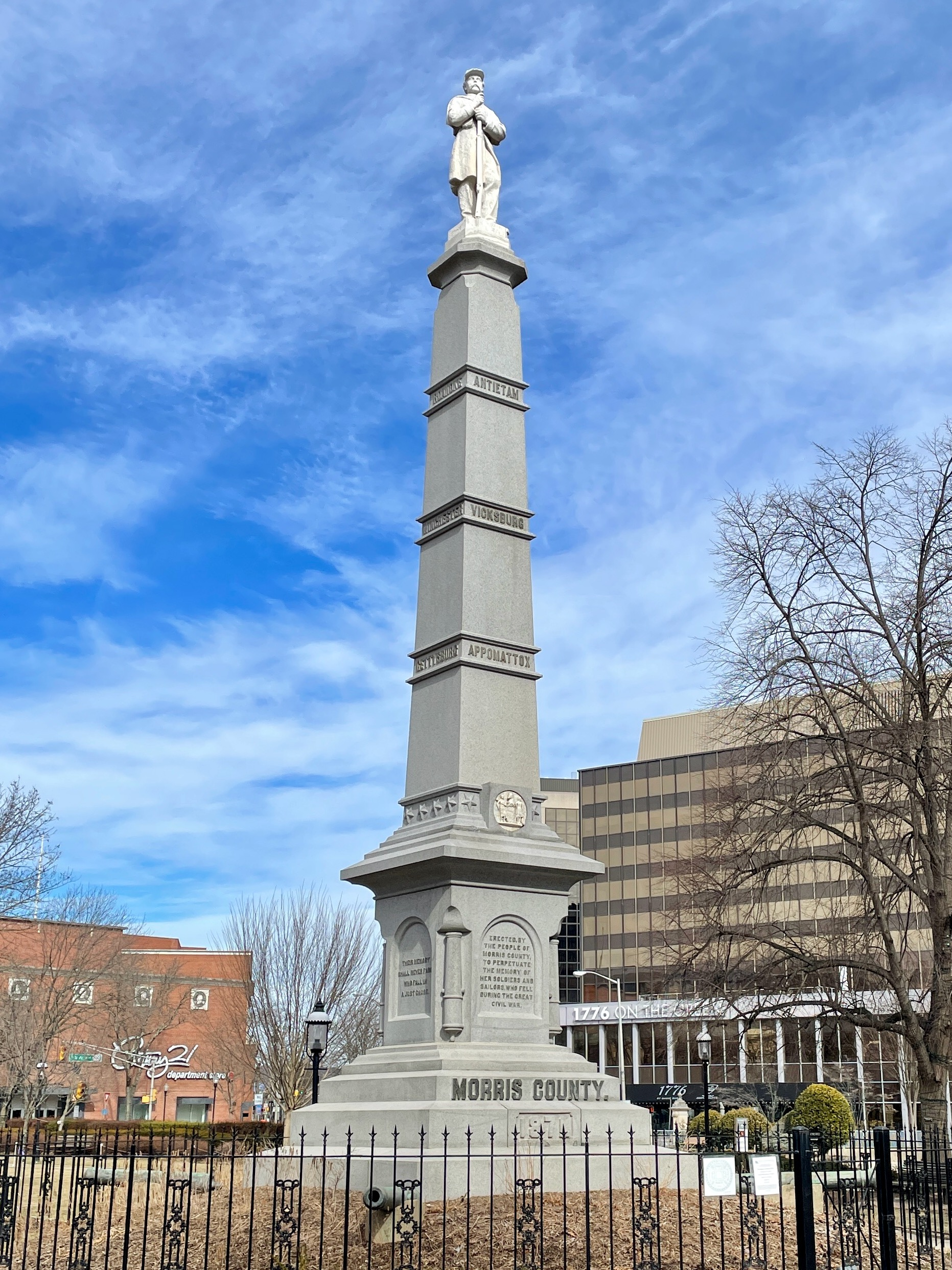
Morris County Civil War Monument (1871)

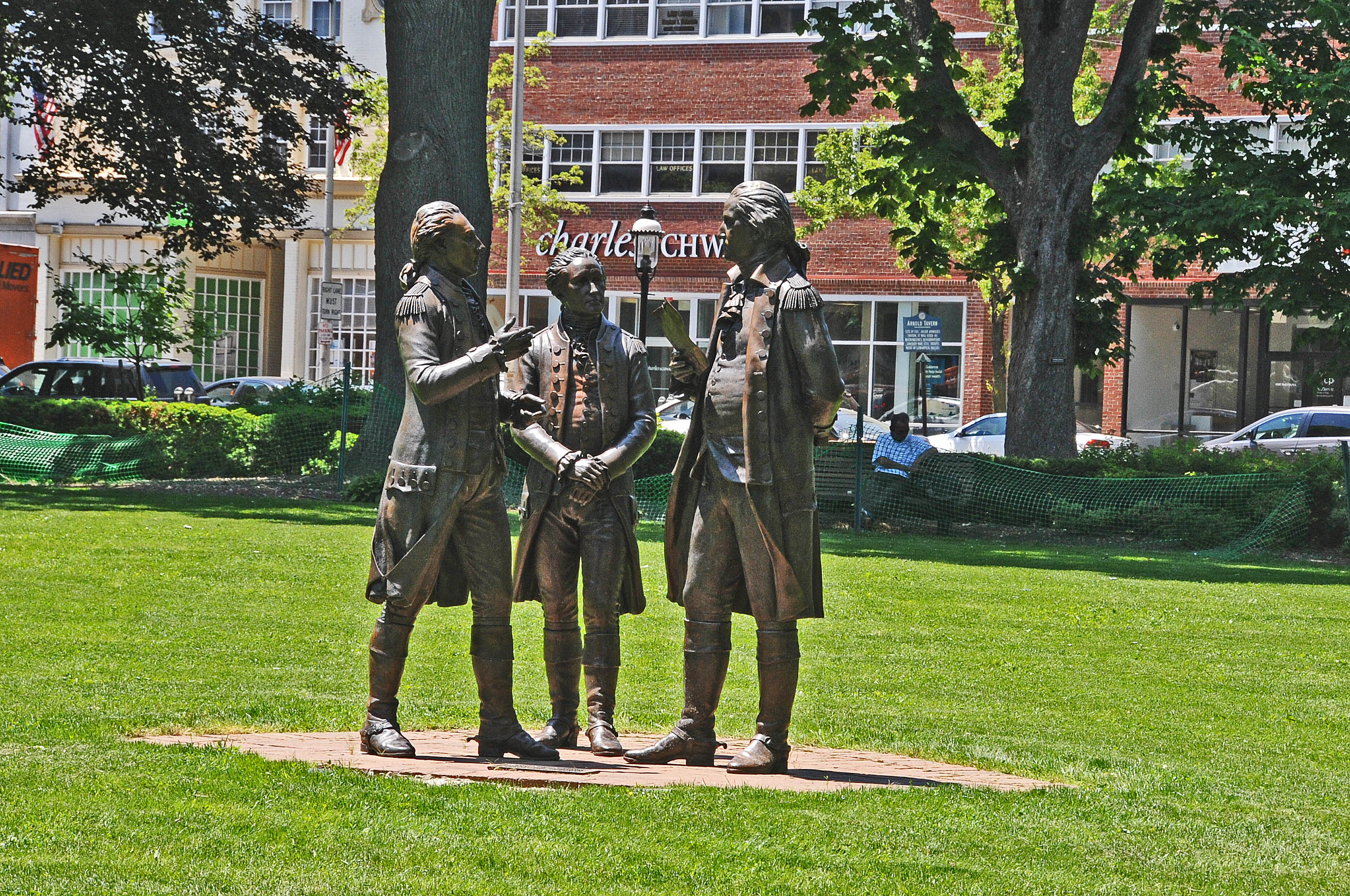
The Alliance (2007), featuring bronze figures of George Washington, Alexander Hamilton and the Marquis de Lafayette

Several statues have been erected, many of which glorify American colonial, Revolutionary War, and Civil War figures.

On July 4, 1871, the Morris County Civil War Monument was dedicated, featuring a full-length statue of a Civil War soldier. It was designed by sculptor Henry H. Davis and erected by the people of Morris County.

In 2007, The Alliance was unveiled, a bronze statue that served as "the centerpiece of the 'Green Vision' campaign, a plan to upgrade and enhance the park, and to establish an endowment fund to help maintain and preserve it." The statue commemorates a supposedly historic "meeting of George Washington, the young Marquis de Lafayette, and young Alexander Hamilton depicting them discussing aid of French tall ships and [6,000] troops being sent by King Louis XVI," which is symbolized by Washington holding a letter from the French king. The statue was created by Eliot and Ivan Schwartz of Brooklyn's Studio EIS.

During the Bicentennial of the Morristown Green on October 16, 2016, reenactors of each historical figure were photographed beside the statue. That year, an unknown person vandalized the statue by stealing Washington's thumb and his letter from King Louis XVI.

There is also a guide dog commemorative statue.

== Landscape ==
The Green has won some awards due to the renovation efforts by Dewberry, a civil, landscape architecture, environmental services and construction engineering firm. It received an Excellence Award in the Public Space category from Downtown New Jersey for the renovation done on the Morristown Green under the following criteria:

- Preserving and enhancing the character of the downtown environment
- Contributing to the economic vitality of the downtown district
- Generating pride in the community
- Drawing people to the area
- Demonstrating a coordinated effort by various segments of the community
- Improving the streetscape or visual appearance of the business district

== Landmarks ==
Landmarks include:

1. Patriots' Farewell Fountain (2001).
2. The Alliance (2007). A bronze lifesize sculpture also known as The French Are Coming, located on Morristown Green, commemorating the meeting of General George Washington and Colonel Alexander Hamilton with the Marquis de Lafayette on May 10, 1780.
3. Morris County Civil War Monument (1871). A white granite figure of a Civil War soldier atop a 50-foot white granite shaft.
4. Morris Frank and Buddy statue (2005). On April 29, 2005, a sculpture titled The Way to Independence was unveiled on Morristown Green in Morristown. The sculpture of seeing-eye dog pioneer Morris Frank and his first service animal Buddy, created by John Seward Johnson II, is made of bronze and painted in color. It depicts the pair in mid-stride, with Frank motioning as if he is giving his seeing eye dog the "forward" command.
5. Plaque marking site of Arnold's Tavern (20 North Park Place, across from the Green, in front of Charles Schwab).
6. Marker for the Baptist Church on the Green. Original Site of the First Baptist Church (then located where Century 21 is today). Used as Revolutionary War hospital and burial ground. West of the Green, the present building was constructed in 1892.
7. Original site of the Presbyterian Church.
8. The Liberty Pole.
9. Granite "E. Pluribus Unum" medallion at the center of the Green.
10. Stone marker of first courthouse.and jail
11. Time capsule.
12. Site of the Alexander Carmichael House, occupied by Nathanel Greene, the quartermaster during the Revolution.
13. Site of the Continental Storehouse (where the 40 Park condos now stand).
14. A replica of the survey of the Green by Major Robert Erskine, ordered by Washington in 1779.
15. Gold Star Mothers' Tree.

== Activities ==
The Green holds many different activities throughout the year, but the most prominent event is the Festival on the Green. This is an open-air event where businesses and organizations come together to share their resources and have a huge block party. Other events include the Christmas Festival, the Moonlight Movies in Morristown, and multiple blood drives. The Green is also used to let the community gather and voice their opinion, a fact of which the Tea Party has made use.

The annual Christmas Festival is a four-week event that began 97 years ago, with a group of volunteers lighting a star on top of a signal tree in the Green. Now it has grown to include a Santa House and other seasonal decorations. The festival includes several events that are free to the public thanks to the sponsorship of local businesses, including Century 21, Morristown Memorial Hospital and Hyatt Morristown.

The Seeing Eye was established in 1929, and is the oldest existing school for guide dogs in the world. Here dogs are instructed in helping individuals that are blind so that they can be more mobile. The dogs are taught when and where something is dangerous or is an obstacle and people are instructed in how to get the best from their dog. The Seeing Eye gives tours of its facilities to schools in the surrounding area.
