= Presbyterian Church Cemetery, Morristown =

Historic churchyard in Morris County, New Jersey

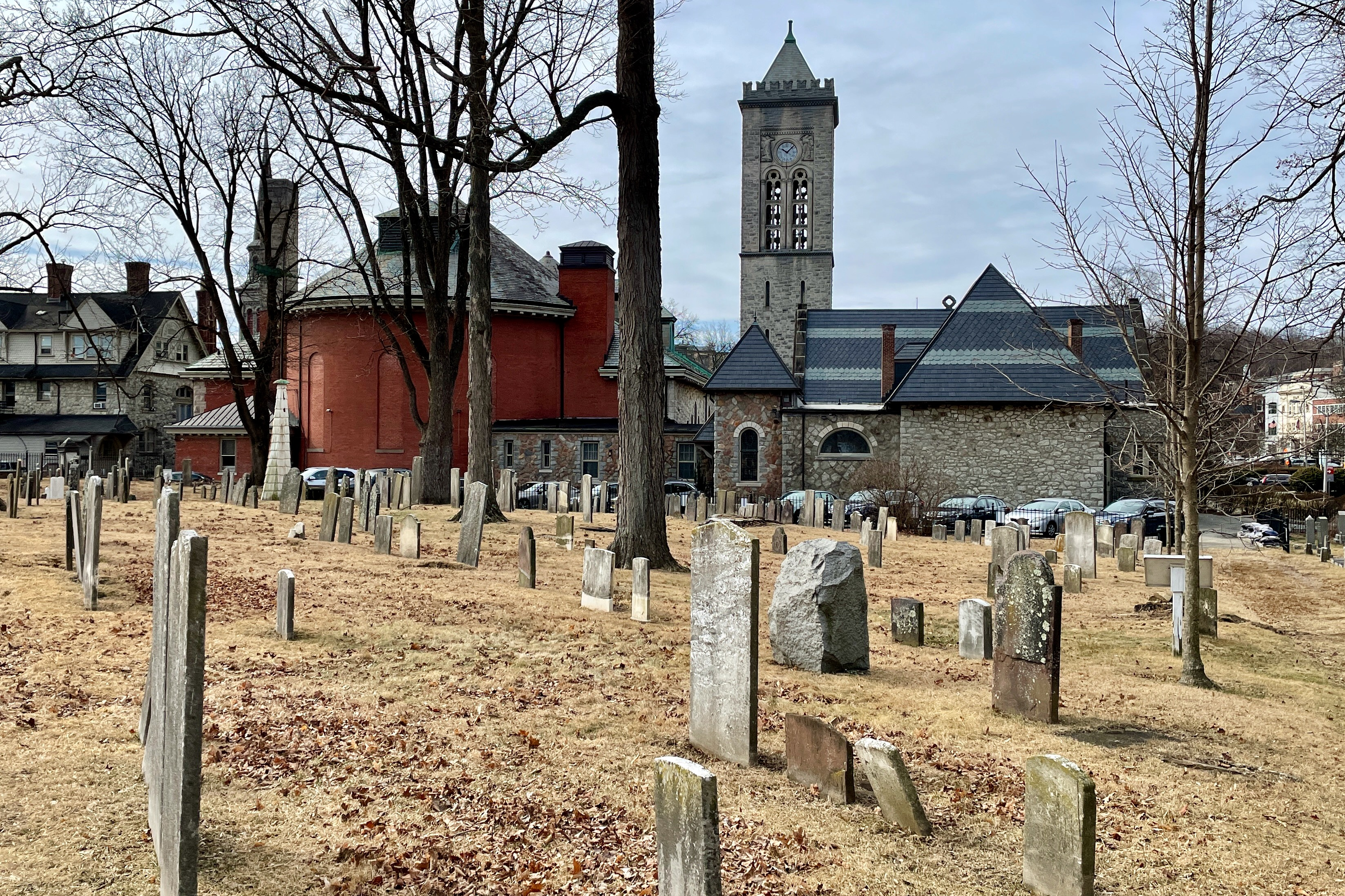
- Burying Ground of the Presbyterian Church
- Interactive map of Presbyterian Church Cemetery, Morristown

Details
- Location: Morristown, New Jersey
- Coordinates: 40°47′53″N 74°28′45″W
- Presbyterian Church Cemetery, Morristown
- U.S. Historic district – Contributing property
- Part of: Morristown District (ID73001126)
- Designated CP: October 30, 1973

The First Presbyterian Church Cemetery is a historic churchyard cemetery of the First Presbyterian Church in Morristown, New Jersey, United States. The cemetery was added to the National Register of Historic Places, listed as a contributing property to the Morristown District, on October 30, 1973.

== History ==
The oldest interments date to 1731. There is a mass gravesite for about 150 soldiers of the American Revolutionary War who died from smallpox in 1777.

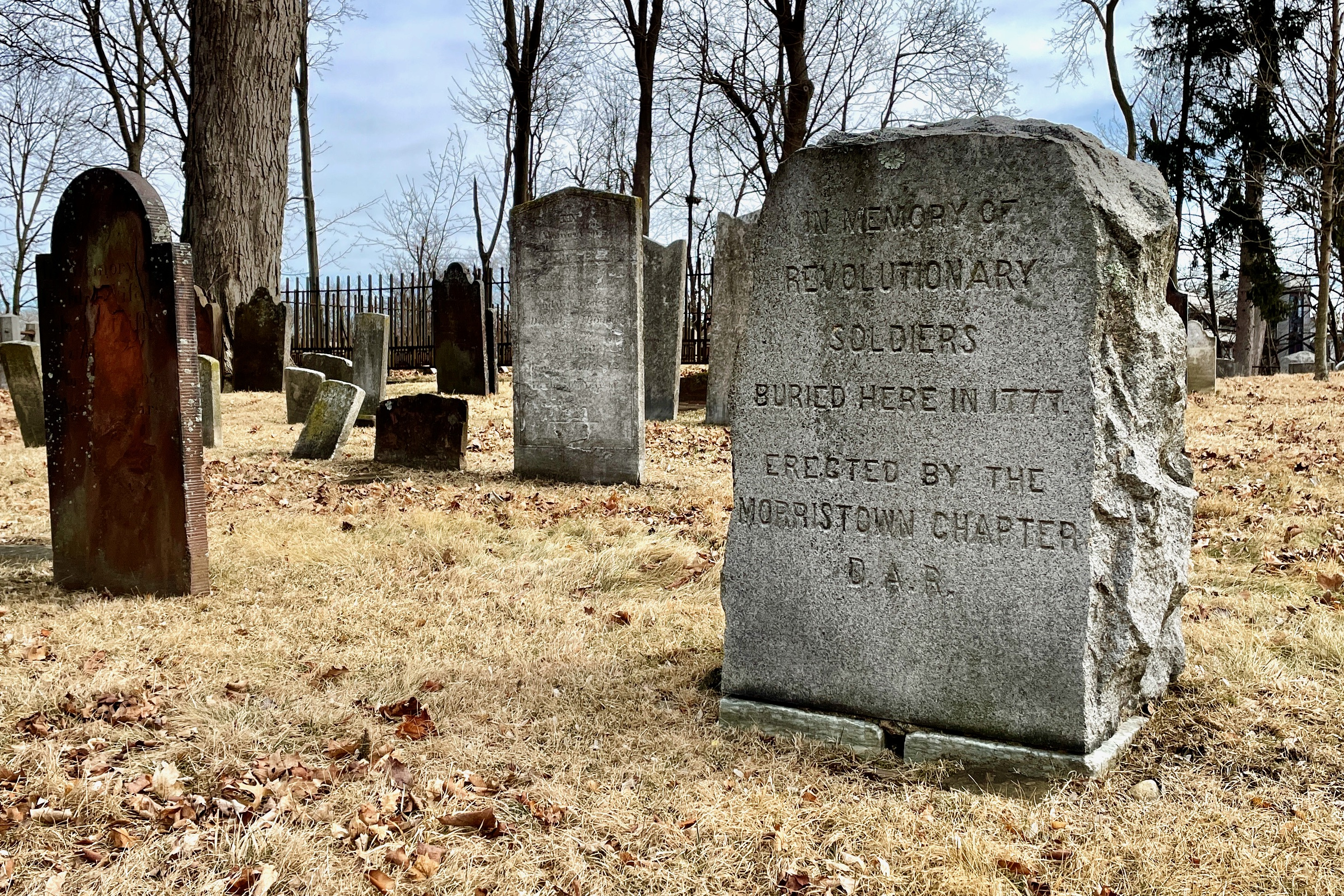
Revolutionary War memorial

== Notable burials ==
- Samuel Beach Axtell (1819–1891), U.S. Congressman, Governor of Utah and New Mexico
- Silas Condict (1738–1801), delegate to the Continental Congress
- John Doughty (1754–1826), Revolutionary War Continental Army Officer
- Jacob Ford Sr. (1704–1777), iron manufacturer, politician and judge
- Jacob Ford Jr. (1738–1777) and Theodosia Ford (1741–1824), owners of the Ford Mansion, used by General Washington during the Revolutionary War
- Jonas P. Phoenix (1788–1859), US Congressman
- George Vail (1809–1875), represented New Jersey's 4th congressional district in the United States House of Representatives from 1853 to 1857.

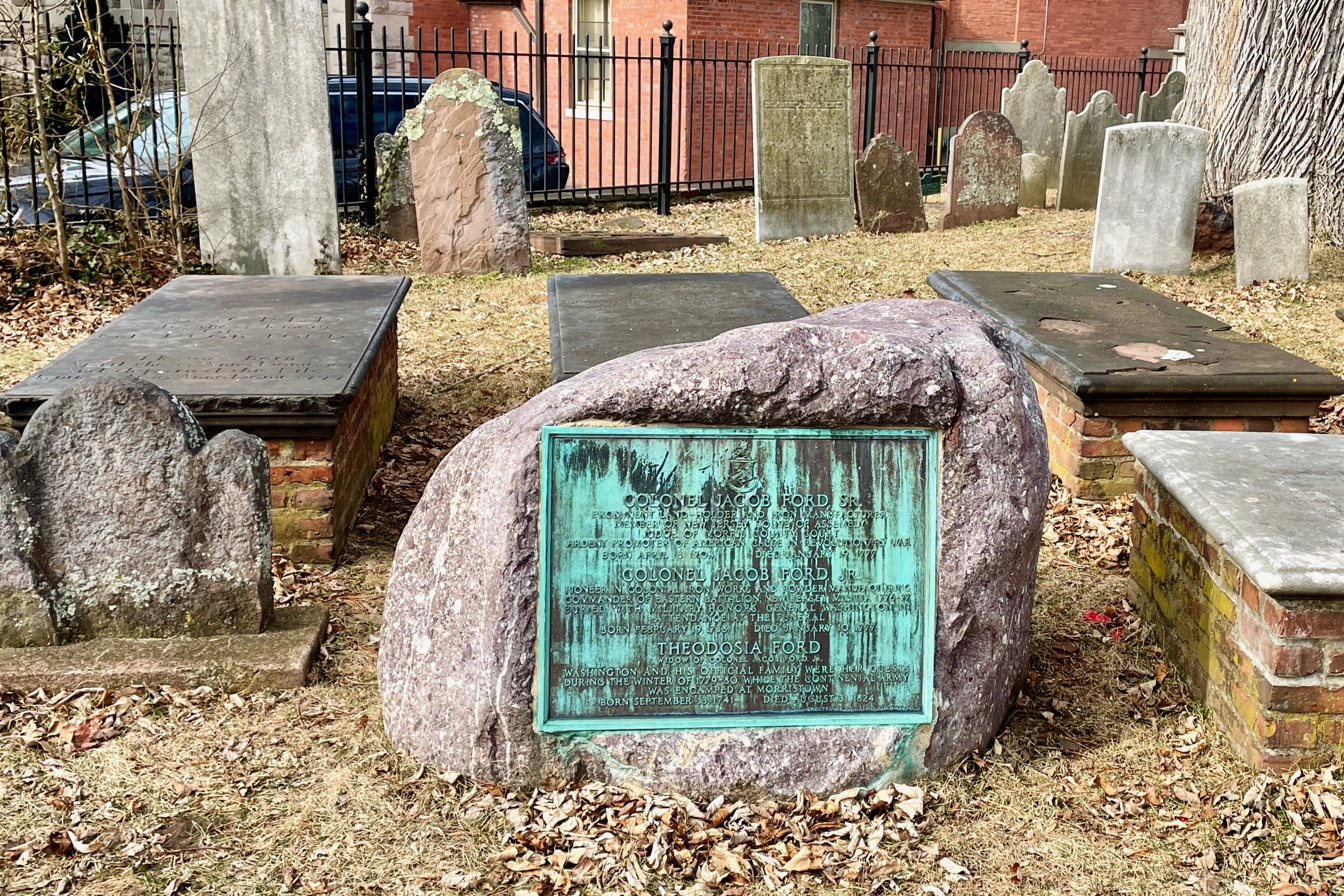
Jacob Ford family plot

== See also ==
- List of cemeteries in New Jersey
- National Register of Historic Places listings in Morris County, New Jersey
