= Cutler Homestead =

- U.S. National Register of Historic Places
- New Jersey Register of Historic Places
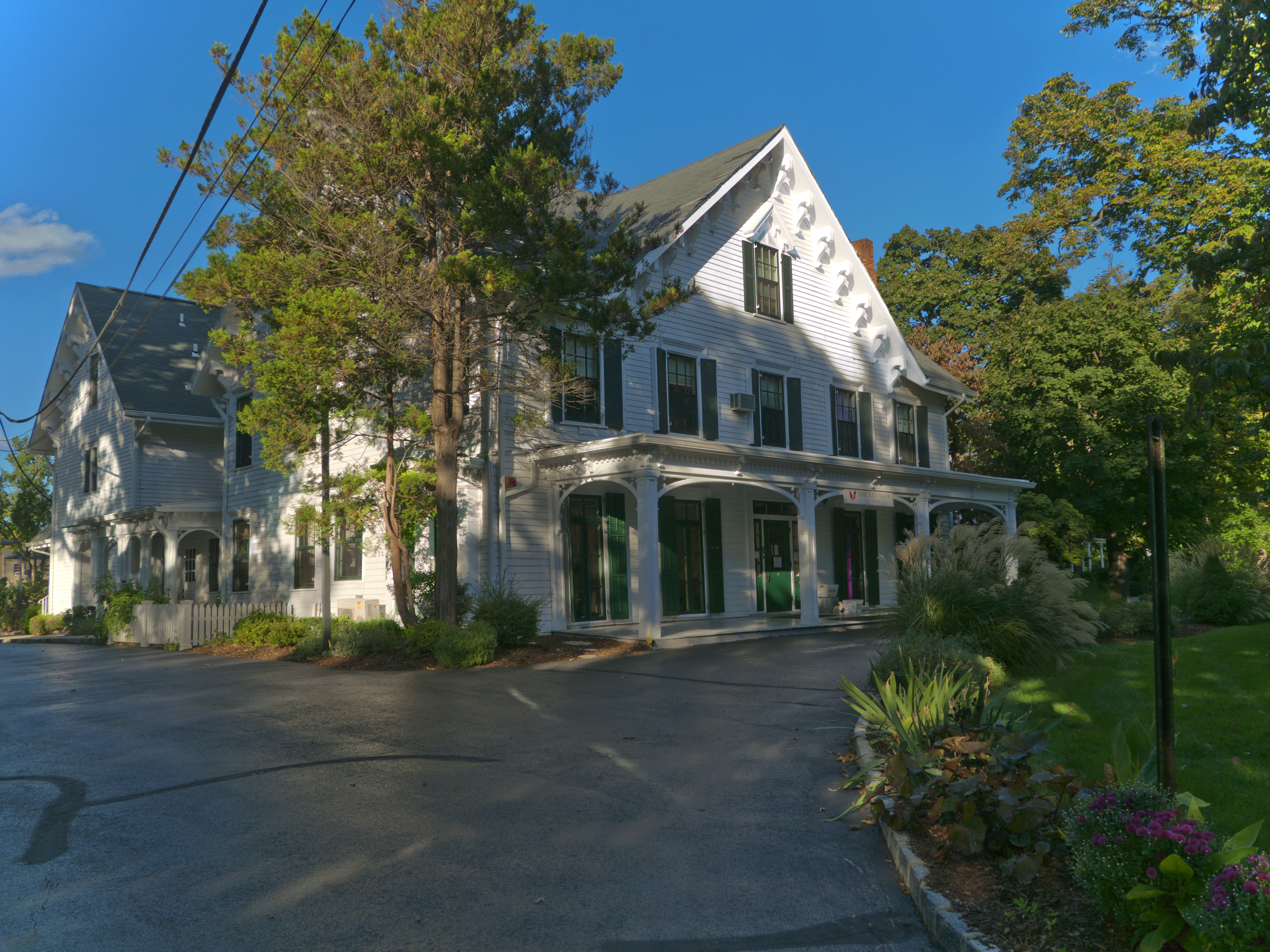
- Cutler Homestead in 2012

- Location within Morris County, New Jersey Location within New Jersey Location within the United States
- Location: 21 Cutler Street; Morristown, New Jersey
- Coordinates: 40°48′28″N 74°29′04″W
- Built: 1799
- Built by: Joseph Cutler
- Architectural style: Greek Revival, Gothic Revival
- NRHP reference No.: 75001152
- NJRHP No.: 2185

Significant dates
- Added to NRHP: March 10, 1975
- Designated NJRHP: July 1, 1974

The Cutler Homestead is a historic house located at 21 Cutler Street in the town of Morristown in Morris County, New Jersey. Originally built in 1799 by Joseph Cutler for Silas Condict, it was added to the National Register of Historic Places on March 10, 1975, for its significance in architecture, law, and politics/government.

== History and description ==
The original two-story section of the house was built in 1799 by Joseph Cutler (1778–1854) for Silas Condict (1738–1801). In 1800, Cutler married Condict's granddaughter, Elizabeth Phoebe Cook. After Condict's death, Cutler was appointed one of the executors. In 1853, it was enlarged by his youngest son, Augustus W. Cutler (1827–1897), with Greek Revival and Gothic Revival styles. His eldest son, Willard Walker Cutler (1856–1926), lived in the house until 1885.

Augustus Cutler was elected as a Democrat to the United States House of Representatives, serving from 1875 to 1879. The house was seen as a headquarters of the Democratic Party in New Jersey. In Congress, he introduced the original Free School Bill.

== See also ==
- National Register of Historic Places listings in Morris County, New Jersey
