= Augustus W. Cutler =

American politician and lawyer (1827–1897)

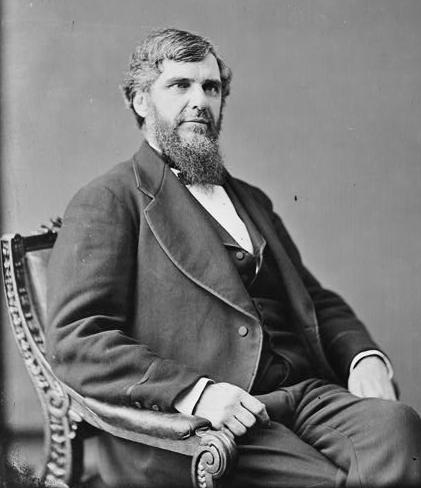
- Cutler, 1865–1880

Member of the U.S. House of Representatives from New Jersey's 5th district
- In office March 4, 1875 – March 3, 1879
- Preceded by: William W. Phelps
- Succeeded by: Charles H. Voorhis

Member of the New Jersey Senate from Morris County
- In office 1871–1874
- Preceded by: Columbus Beach
- Succeeded by: John Hill

Personal details
- Born: Augustus William Cutler; October 22, 1827 Morristown, New Jersey, US
- Died: January 1, 1897 (aged 69) Morristown, New Jersey, US
- Resting place: Evergreen Cemetery
- Party: Democratic
- Spouse: Julia Rebecca Walker
- Profession: Politician, lawyer

Augustus William Cutler (October 22, 1827 – January 1, 1897) was a 19th-century politician and lawyer from New Jersey. The great-grandson of Silas Condict, he served two terms in the United States House of Representatives from 1875 to 1879.

== Biography ==
Born at the Cutler Homestead in Morristown, New Jersey, Cutler spent the early part of his life on a farm, attended common schools as a child and later Yale College. He studied law and was admitted to the bar in 1850, commencing practice in Morristown.

=== Early career ===
He was prosecutor of pleas for Morris County, New Jersey, from 1856 to 1861, elected president of the board of education in 1870, served in the New Jersey Senate from 1871 to 1874 and was a delegate to the New Jersey constitutional convention in 1873.

=== Congress ===
Cutler was elected as a Democrat to the United States House of Representatives in 1874, serving from 1875 to 1879; he declined to be a candidate for renomination in 1878. He served as chairman of the Committee on Agriculture from 1877 to 1879. Afterward, he resumed practicing law in Morristown, New Jersey, and was an unsuccessful candidate for the United States House of Representatives in 1880 and 1896.

=== Death and burial ===
Cutler died in Morristown on January 1, 1897, and was interred in Evergreen Cemetery in Morristown.

== Legacy ==
"Gus" owned property in 14 states, including vast holdings in New Jersey. His wife, Julia Rebecca Walker, was the half-sister of Henry, George and Frederick Walker (Albany, NY; father: Willard Walker). From them, she inherited property in Benton Township, Ohio. The towns of Rocky Ridge, OH and Graytown, OH were founded and developed by Gus and Julia. A substantial collection of papers relating to the Ohio holdings is held by the Ottawa County Historical Museum.

U.S. House of Representatives
| Preceded by William W. Phelps | Member of the U.S. House of Representatives from New Jersey's 5th congressional district March 4, 1875 – March 3, 1879 | Succeeded by Charles H. Voorhis |
