= Dr. Lewis Condict House =

- U.S. National Register of Historic Places
- U.S. Historic district – Contributing property
- New Jersey Register of Historic Places
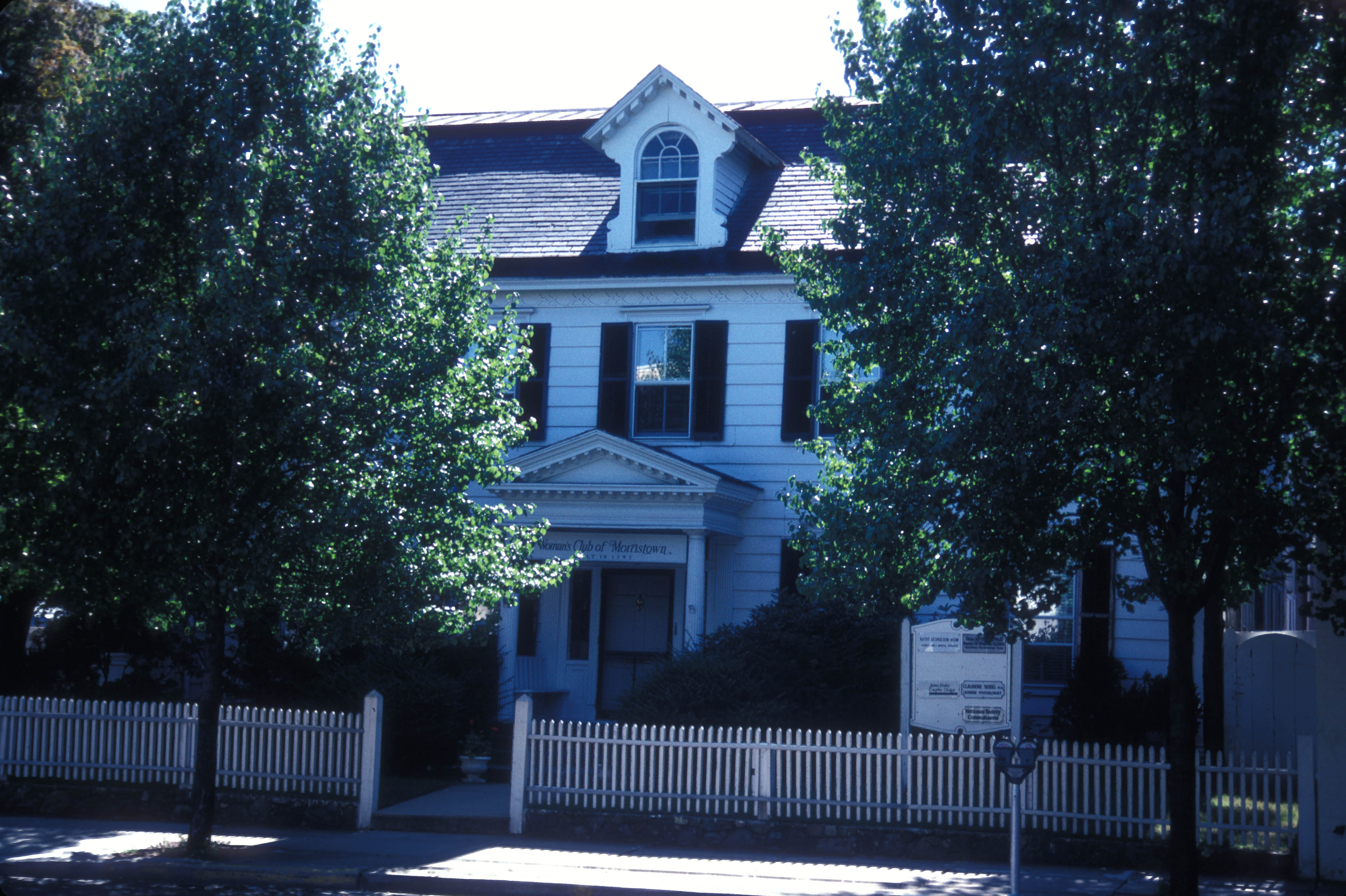
- Dr. Lewis Condict House

- Location within Morris County, New Jersey Location within New Jersey Location within the United States
- Location: 51 South Street; Morristown, New Jersey
- Coordinates: 40°47′23″N 74°28′50″W
- Built: 1797
- Architectural style: Federal
- Part of: Morristown District (ID73001126)
- NRHP reference No.: 73001125
- NJRHP No.: 2183

Significant dates
- Added to NRHP: April 3, 1973
- Designated CP: October 30, 1973
- Designated NJRHP: June 19, 1972

The Dr. Lewis Condict House is a historic house at 51 South Street in Morristown of Morris County, New Jersey. Built in 1797, it was added to the National Register of Historic Places on April 3, 1973, for its significance in architecture and health/medicine. In 1937, the Woman's Club of Morristown purchased the house for its headquarters. The house was added as a contributing property to the Morristown District on October 30, 1973.

== History and description ==
The house was built by Dr. Lewis Condict (1772–1862) in 1797. The land was previously owned by his uncle, Silas Condict (1738–1801), a member of the Continental Congress. The house is a 2 1/2 story frame building featuring Federal style.

Lewis Condict was president of the Medical Society of New Jersey, 1816–1819. He was the first president of the Morris and Essex Railroad.

== See also ==
- National Register of Historic Places listings in Morris County, New Jersey
