= Charles H. Voorhis =

American politician (1833–1896)

Charles Henry Voorhis
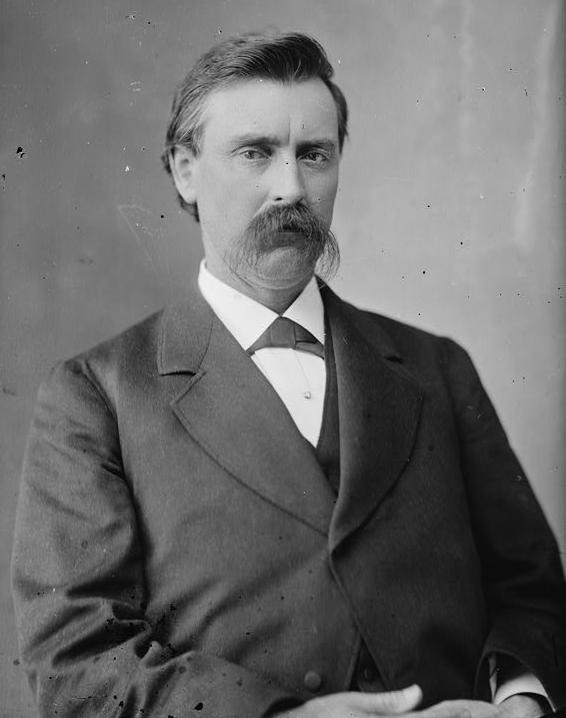
- Voorhis, 1870–1880

Member of the U.S. House of Representatives from New Jersey's 5th district
- In office March 4, 1879 – March 3, 1881
- Preceded by: Augustus W. Cutler
- Succeeded by: John Hill

Personal details
- Born: March 13, 1833 Hackensack, New Jersey, US
- Died: April 15, 1896 (aged 63) Jersey City, New Jersey, US
- Party: Republican
- Profession: Politician, lawyer, judge

Charles Henry Voorhis (March 13, 1833 – April 15, 1896) was a lawyer and judge from New Jersey. On April 15, 1896, he killed himself in his office in downtown Jersey City, New Jersey.

== Biography ==
Voorhis was born in Hackensack, New Jersey. He attended district schools and graduated from Rutgers College in 1853. He moved to Jersey City, New Jersey, studied law and was admitted to the bar in 1856, commencing practice in Jersey City. He was a delegate to the 1864 Republican National Convention, was presiding judge of Bergen County, New Jersey, in 1868 and 1869 and was one of the organizers of the Hackensack Improvement Commission in 1869 as well as of Hackensack Academy. Voorhis organized and served as the first president of the Hackensack Water Company in 1873. Voorhis was one of the founders of both the Bergen County National Bank and the Hackensack Savings Bank in 1868. Both banks failed in the late 1870s, causing losses of approximately $2 million. While Voorhis was indicted for the failure of the banks, he was ultimately acquitted.

He was elected a Republican to the United States House of Representatives in 1878, serving from 1879 to 1881, not being a candidate for reelection in 1880.

After leaving Congress, he resumed his former business pursuits. On April 15, 1896, he killed himself in his office in downtown Jersey City, New Jersey. He was interred in Hackensack Cemetery in Hackensack, New Jersey.

== See also ==
- John Van Voorhis
- Henry Clay Van Voorhis

U.S. House of Representatives
Preceded by Augustus W. Cutler	Member of the U.S. House of Representatives from New Jersey's 5th congressional district March 4, 1879 – March 3, 1881	Succeeded by John Hill
