= St. Peter's Episcopal Church (Morristown, New Jersey) =

Episcopal church in New Jersey, US

- U.S. Historic district – Contributing property
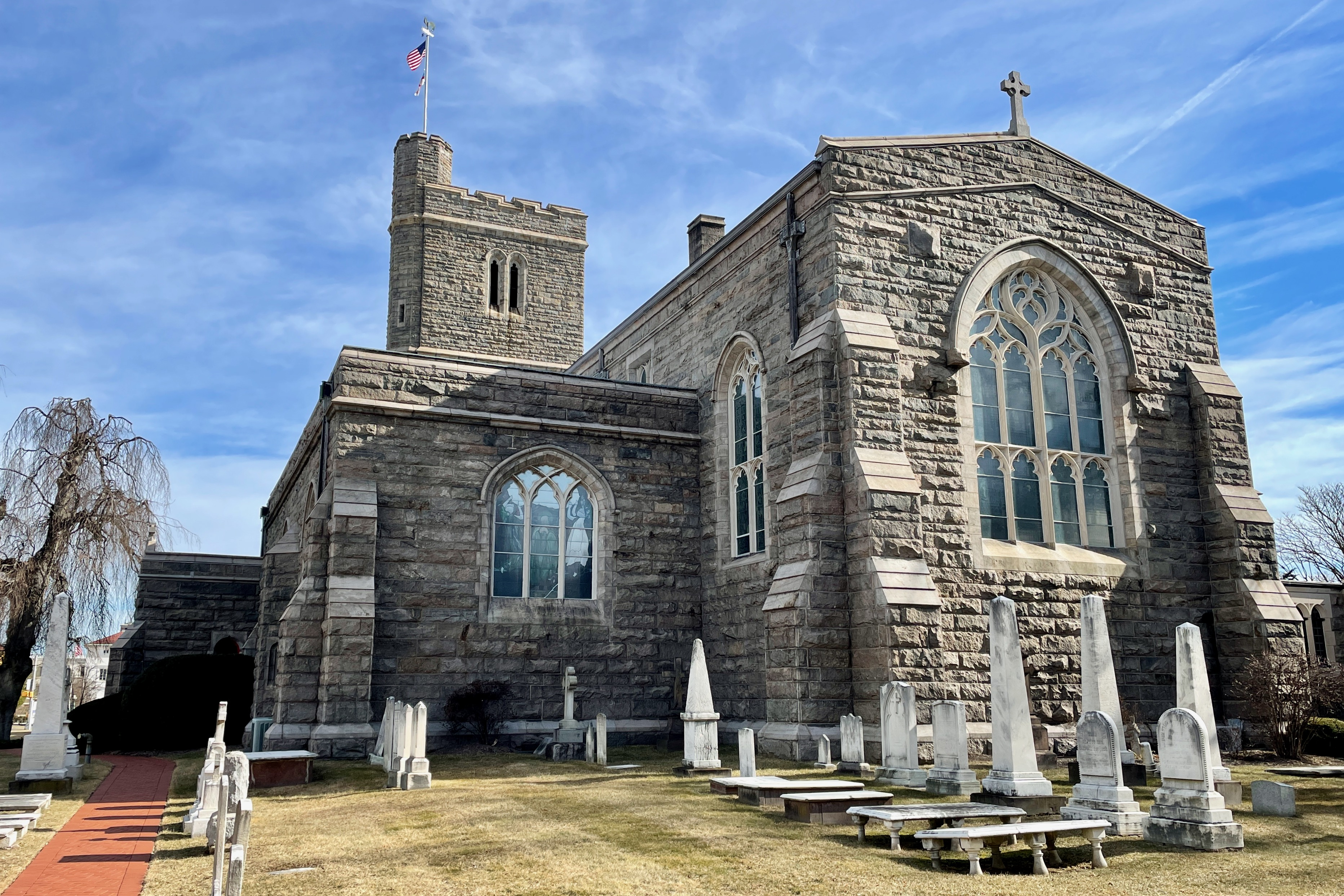
- St. Peter's Episcopal Church and churchyard
- Location: 121 South Street; Morristown, New Jersey
- Built: 1889–1913
- Architect: McKim, Mead, and White
- Architectural style: English gothic
- Website: Official website
- Part of: Morristown District (ID73001126)
- Designated CP: October 30, 1973

St. Peter's Episcopal Church is an active and historic Episcopal church in the Diocese of Newark in Morristown, New Jersey. Located on South Street, St. Peter's congregation has roots going back to the 1760s. Officially founded in 1827, with the current building consecrated in 1911, it is notable for its gothic-revival architecture, medieval interior and fine stained glass. St. Peter's congregation has traditionally worshipped in the High Church tradition. The church was added to the National Register of Historic Places, listed as a contributing property of the Morristown District, on October 30, 1973.

The church reported 1,066 members in 2015 and 727 members in 2025. Plate and pledge income reported for the congregation in 2025 was $430,692. Average Sunday attendance (ASA) in 2025 was 171 persons, down from a reported 421 in 2017.

== History ==
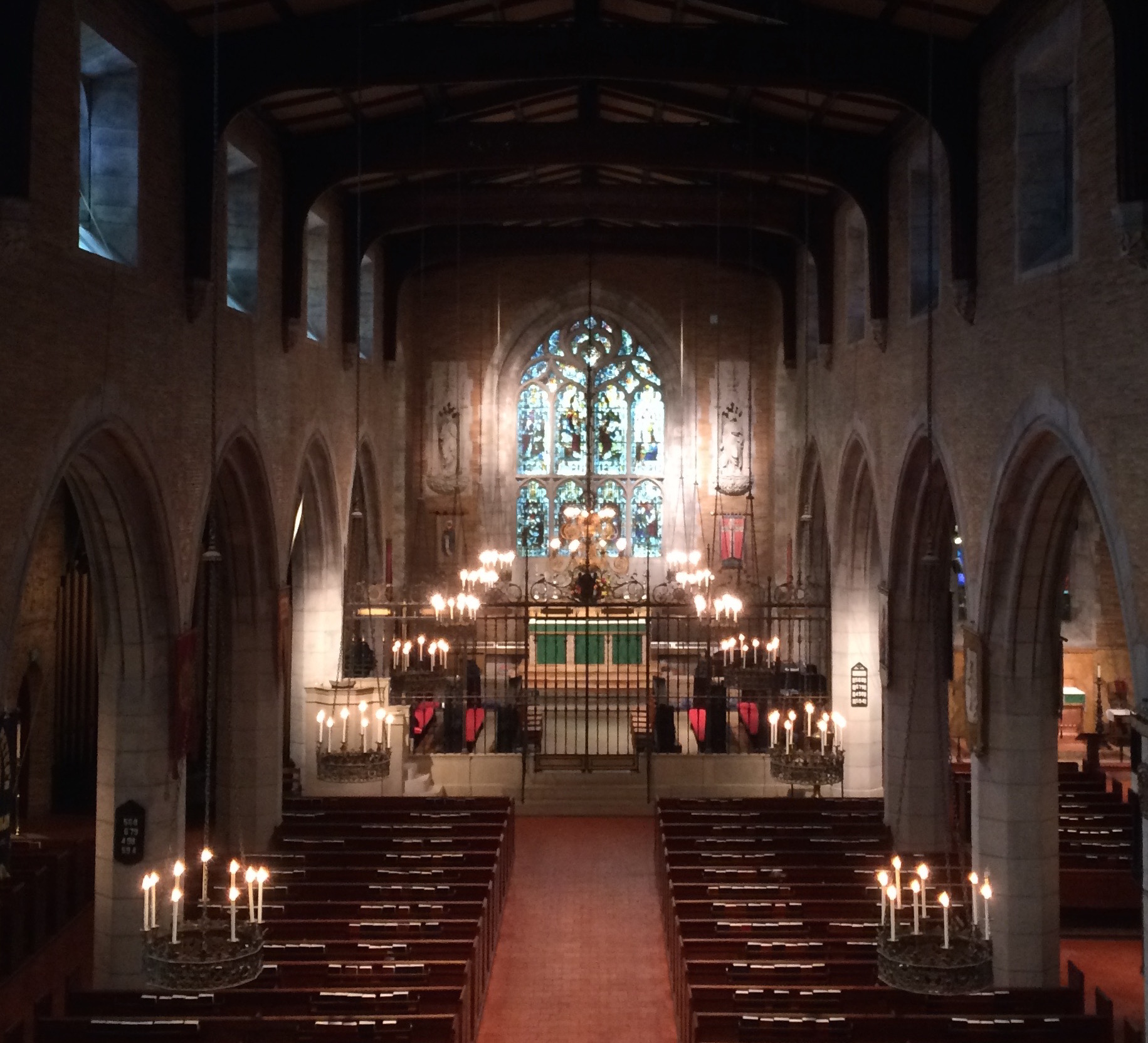
Interior of St. Peter's from the choir loft. Note the rood screen in front of the chancel.

St. Peter's Church was founded on January 1, 1827, as the Episcopal church for the growing community in Morristown. Its first services were held in the home of George Macculloch –a prominent town member and builder of the Morris Canal whose mansion stands near the church. The parent Anglican and Episcopal congregation had existed in the area and called itself St. Peter's since the 1760s, but with the anti-Church of England sentiments during and following the Revolutionary war, St. Peter's, like other Episcopal congregations, did not recover and become mainstream until well into the 1820s.

The side chapel with the Tiffany window of St. Peter, "the rock" of the Church.

In 1840, the Reverend William Staunton introduced the parish to a movement that emphasized the Episcopal Church's catholic origins and apostolic succession as the ties to the Apostolic community and its Eucharistic worship. The current building was designed to include the styles and art of early and medieval Christian liturgy to engage modern worshipers in the Eucharist in this same way.

By 1887, the large congregation, and growing men and boys choirs, justified the erection of the current, massive edifice. The architect of this structure was Charles McKim of the firm McKim, Mead and White that built the old Penn Station, New York, as well as Columbia University, and the Rhode Island State House.

Over 24 years of construction, McKim and the congregation built one of the finest examples of neo-gothic architecture in the United States. St. Peter's is modeled on classic English-medieval parish churches. It also incorporates elements from other Christian periods including chancel mosaics, a baptistry, and the Siena-marble altar each in the Byzantine style, and a Spanish-baroque rood screen. The Norman-style bell tower has 119 steps, and a carillon with 49 bells–one of the largest in the country. The entire parish complex is made up of a cemetery, rectory, great hall and parish house, in addition to the Church, and is known to have at least two secret passageways still in use, concealed behind bookcases and in cloisters connecting the various parts of the property. It was consecrated on November 2, 1911, by the Rt. Rev. Edwin S. Lines, Bishop of Newark, after a parish breakfast that hosted over 500 people.

In its affluence, St. Peter's was the parent church to several other Episcopal parishes in the area. These include St. Mark's Basking Ridge, St. John's Dover, and Grace Episcopal Church in Madison, New Jersey —all built in the 1850s while Dr. Rankin was rector of St. Peter's.

== Today ==
St. Peter's continues its choral and sacramental liturgies today with Sunday services at 8:00am, 9:15am and 10:30am, and a choral evensong each first Sunday of the month at 5:00pm, along with Sunday school and children's choir.
