= Woman's Club of Morristown =

The Woman’s Club of Morristown (WCOMT)
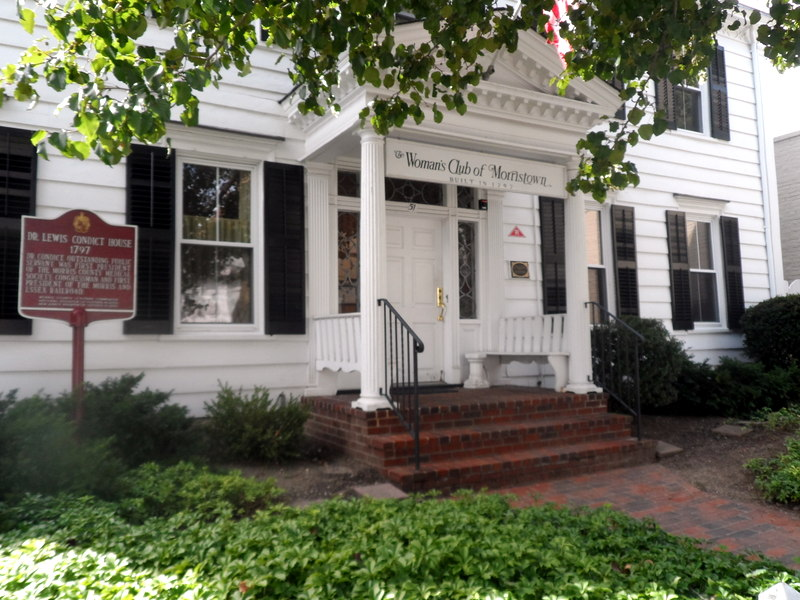
- Dr. Lewis Condict House, listed on the National Register Of Historic Places
- Formation: 1910
- Legal status: 501(c)(3) organization
- Headquarters: 51 South Street; Morristown, NJ 07960
- Website: https://wcomt.org/
- Formerly called: Woman’s Town Improvement Committee (1910); Woman’s Civic Association (1920); Incorporated as The Woman’s Club of Morristown (1930)

The Woman's Club of Morristown is a non-profit, non-political, and non-sectarian organization whose purpose is to promote improvements within the community; to offer civic, cultural and educational activities; and to maintain and preserve the historic Dr. Lewis Condict House. Membership is open to women living or working in the greater Morristown, NJ, area.

Notable members included suffragist Alison Turnbull Hopkins and farmer and philanthropist Caroline Rose Foster.

In 2003, the National Park Service listed the WCOMT in "Properties Associated with the Women's Rights Movement" as part of a Women's Rights National History Trail Feasibility Study.

== History ==
Established in 1910, the WCOMT was initially titled the Woman's Town Improvement Committee. Part of its goals aligned with the City Beautiful movement.

In 1912, the Club allied with the all-male Civic Association of Morristown to demand better conditions for the Maple Avenue School, after hearing about its abysmal state, overcrowding, and "vital fire danger." The two groups collaborated to demand that the Board of Education rectify the Maple Avenue School's condition as well as constructing a new school. The Club's leader, Mrs. W. W. Cutler, insisted that a new school was necessary. Editorials about the situation were printed in The Jerseyman as well as its political opposite, True Democratic Banner.

After years of debate and referendums, the construction of the new school was approved in 1916; construction began in September 1916 and the new, comparatively spacious Morristown High School was open to students by September 4, 1918.

By 1923, the Club was renamed Morristown Woman's Civic Organization, and it was printed in the Annual Register of Women's Clubs and National Organizations in America. Its President was identified "Mrs. James L. Dexter"; the President's own name is not stated. At the time, the Club was headquartered at 87 Early Street in Morristown.

In 1928, Railway Age reported that the Club (specifically Mrs. D. F. Barkman) were on a Committee supporting D. L. & W. Railroad's railway electrification, which would greatly improve the commute of thousands of New Jersey residents. The lines in question were Hoboken to Dover via Morristown; Passaic & Delaware branch to Gladstone; and the Montclair branch. The cost was estimated to be US$14,000,000–US$18,000,000. The Committee was successful and the entire project was completed on January 11, 1931.

== Stewardship of Dr. Lewis Condict House ==
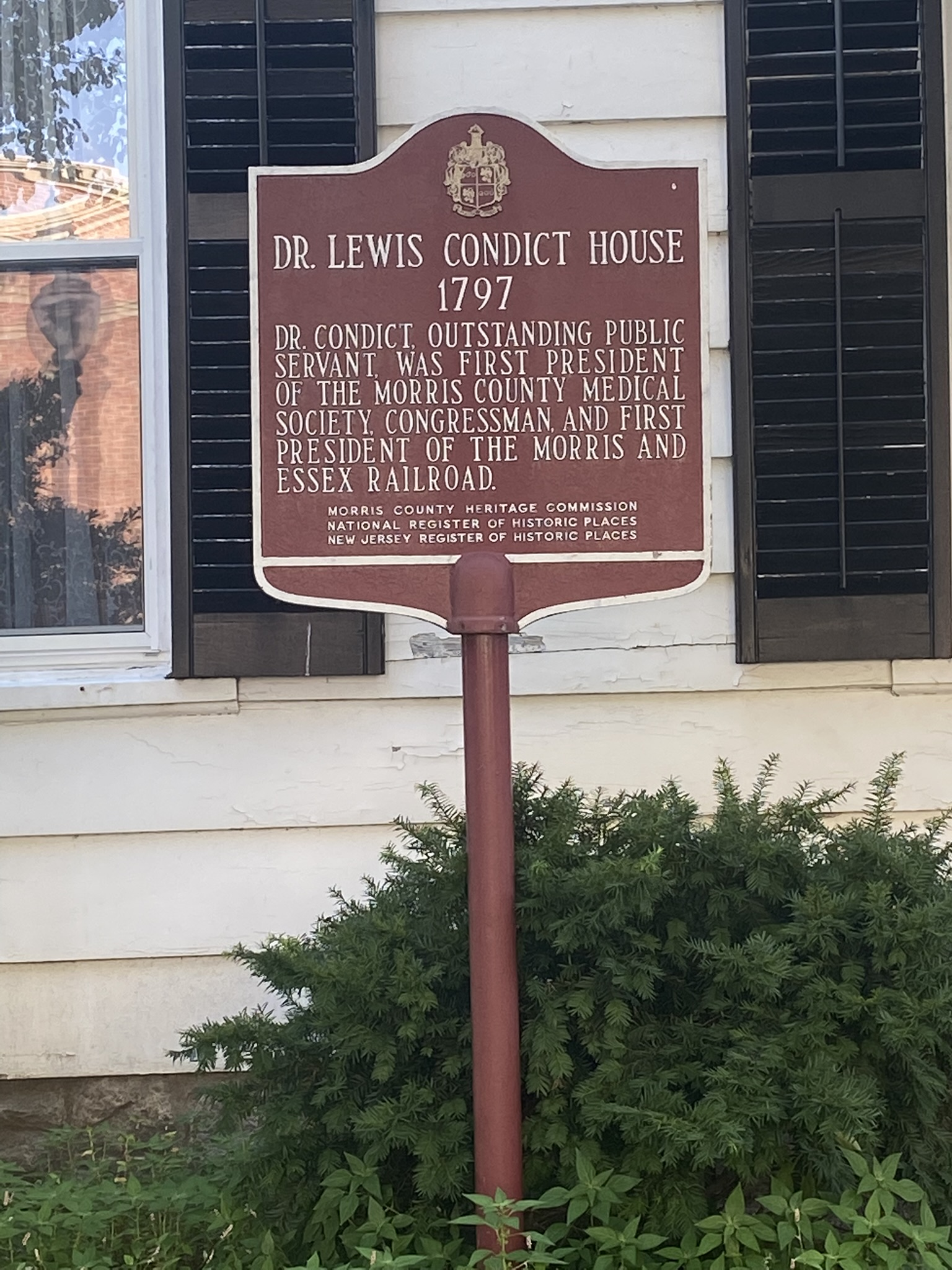
Historical marker of the Dr. Lewis Condict House, outside the current Women's Club headquarters.

In 1937, the Club purchased the Dr. Lewis Condict House, a "five-bay, Federal-style clapboard house" constructed in 1797. The house was declared a New Jersey Historic Site in 1971, and in 1973 it was placed on the National Register of Historic Places.

== Philanthropy and public service ==
In 1964, the Club held roundtable discussions open to the public about how to combat drug abuse. These presentations led to the 1965 creation of the Committee for Narcotics Preventions of Morris County, led by Anne Louise Sando McGee Groome. Around this time, Sears Roebuck awarded the Club as part of its Community Improvement Contest, specifically for Groome's work in the field of drug abuse.

The Woman’s Club of Morristown (WCOMT) has a long history of service to women, children, and families in need. The Community Services group coordinates collections of items for donation to various organizations, as well as knits, quilts, and crochets items.

The Club currently supports a variety of local and national charities, including Deirdre’s House, The Neighborhood House, The Ronald McDonald House, and The Seaman’s Institute.

== Events ==
The WCOMT hosts an annual Rummage Sale each summer, as well as a Holiday Boutique. Proceeds from these major fundraisers directly benefit the Club’s service projects, activities, and restoration efforts. Donations are drawn from the local community at various collection times throughout the year.

== Scholarships ==
Each year, the WCOMT grants four scholarships to young women graduating from Morristown High School. Recipients are selected based on scholastic achievement, leadership, and community service.

== Notable members ==
- Alison Turnbull Hopkins, suffrage activist
- Caroline Rose Foster, farmer and philanthropist

== See also ==
- History of New Jersey
- Women's club movement in the United States
- Women's rights
