= William Walter Phelps =

American politician and diplomat (1839–1894)

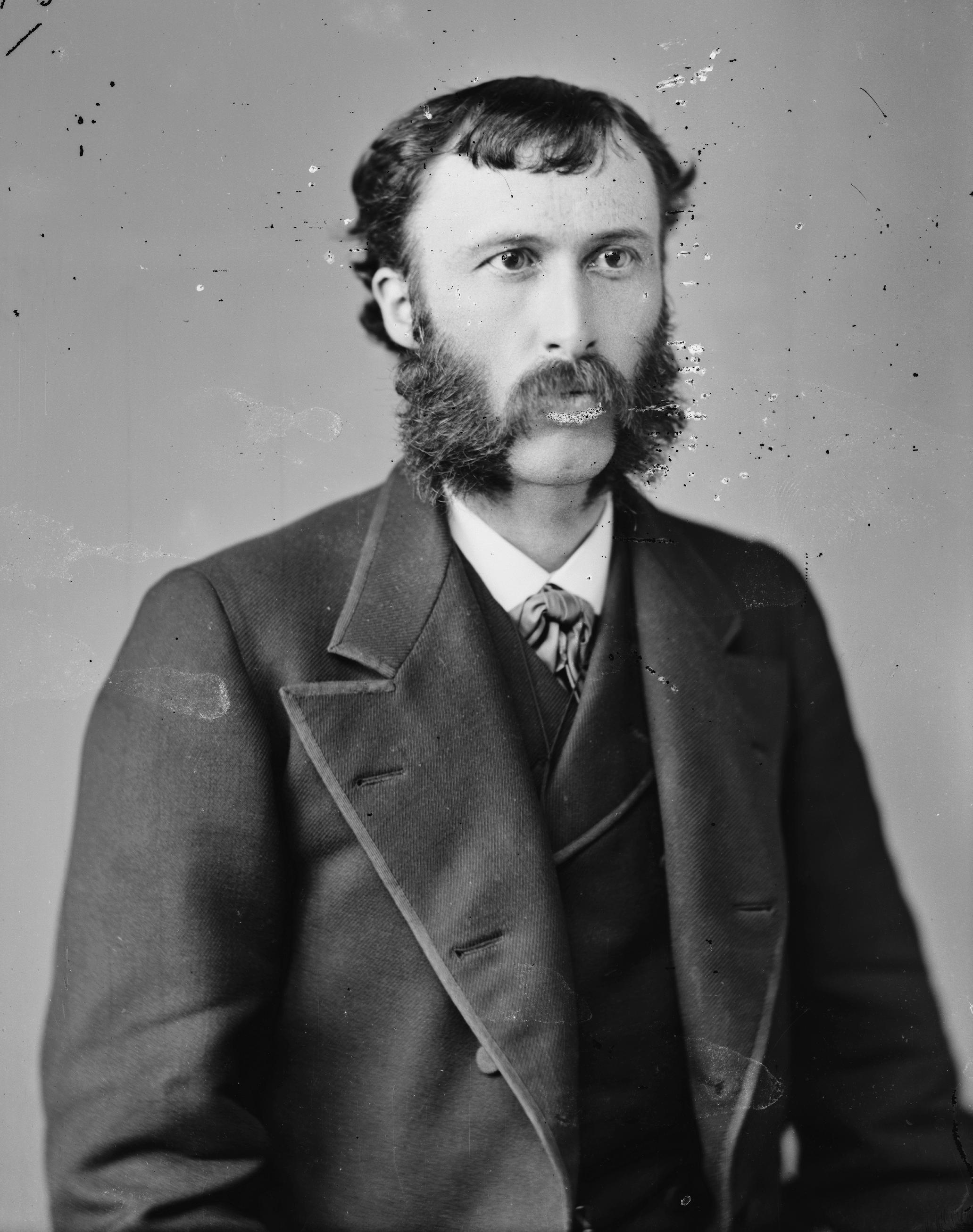
- Phelps, 1865–1880

United States Ambassador to Germany
- In office September 26, 1889 – June 4, 1893
- President: Benjamin Harrison; Grover Cleveland
- Preceded by: George H. Pendleton
- Succeeded by: Theodore Runyon

Member of the U.S. House of Representatives from New Jersey's 5th district
- In office March 4, 1883 – March 3, 1889
- Preceded by: John Hill
- Succeeded by: Charles D. Beckwith
- In office March 4, 1873 – March 3, 1875
- Preceded by: George A. Halsey
- Succeeded by: Augustus W. Cutler

11th United States Minister to Austria-Hungary
- In office May 5, 1881 – June 30, 1882
- President: James Garfield; Chester A. Arthur
- Preceded by: John A. Kasson
- Succeeded by: Alphonso Taft

Personal details
- Born: August 24, 1839 New York City, U.S.
- Died: June 17, 1894 (aged 55) Teaneck, New Jersey, U.S.
- Resting place: Simsbury Cemetery, Simsbury, Connecticut, U.S.
- Party: Republican
- Spouse: Ellen Maria Sheffield Phelps (m. 1860)
- Children: 3
- Education: Yale College; Columbia Law School
- Profession: Attorney; Banker

William Walter Phelps (August 24, 1839 – June 17, 1894) was a United States Congressman and diplomat who served as United States Ambassador to Germany and Austria-Hungary.

He was the son of John Jay Phelps, a successful New York City merchant and financier. Prior to being elected to the United States House of Representatives he had a successful banking career in Manhattan, settling in Teaneck, New Jersey, across the Hudson River.

== Early life ==
William Walter Phelps was born in New York City on August 24, 1839. His first school experience was at Mount Washington Institute in New York. Phelps then attended private school at Golden Hill near Bridgeport, Connecticut, where his academic advancement was so rapid that he was fully prepared for college at the age of 15.

He graduated from Yale College in 1860, valedictorian of his class and a member of Skull and Bones. In the same year he married Ellen Maria Sheffield of New Haven, Connecticut. They traveled in Europe, where, in Paris, in 1861, their first child, John Jay II, was born. Phelps attended Columbia Law School, graduating in 1863. Following this, he practiced corporate law in New York City. In 1864, their second child, Sheffield, was born.

Phelps followed the family career in banking and industry, serving as a director for the National City Bank, the Second National Bank of New York, the United States Trust Co., the Farmer's Loan & Trust Co. and nine railroads.

William Walter Phelps came to Teaneck in 1865. After the birth of his two sons, he bought a summer home in Bergen County an old-fashioned Dutch farmhouse on the "Teaneck Ridge", an area of Teaneck now adjacent to Route 4 that had been the Garret-Brinkerhoff House in Revolutionary War days. Phelps extensively renovated the old homestead, converting it into one of the most beautiful and celebrated mansions of its time. In 1868, the last child, Marian, was born; she would go on to give birth to his grandson Phelps Phelps. In 1869, following the death of his father, John Jay, Phelps retired from his law practice and moved the family full-time to Teaneck.

== Congressman ==
William Walter Phelps

Combining eloquence with an interest in politics, Phelps, a Republican, sought and won a seat in the United States House of Representatives in 1872 at the age of 34, representing New Jersey in the 43rd congress. During his first term in Congress. Phelps was considered by his colleagues to be a serious, well-versed and mature public servant - a successful young lawyer, ambitious, with money and energy who was expected to make his mark on politics and statesmanship.

Phelps failed in his first bid for reelection, in 1874. After his term ended, Phelps returned in 1875 to his Teaneck home, where he planned improvements to the homestead and looked for additional land investments nearby. In the next year, he embarked upon a European tour, partly to regain his health which had suffered from a bout of typhoid fever. While abroad, Phelps investigated institutions of learning and art in England, France and Germany, and enjoyed the society of scholars, authors and scientists.

== Arboriculturist ==
Returning to the United States, Phelps spent most of his time resting and working on his most important hobby—his estate. His great passion was trees and the woods; he was a devotee of arboriculture. Between 1875 and 1880 Phelps was responsible for planting approximately 600,000 trees of numerous varieties.

In 1880 Phelps was selected to manage the Republican Presidential campaign but he was unable to complete the assignment because of feeble health. In 1881, President James A. Garfield named Phelps as Envoy Extraordinary and Minister Plenipotentiary to Austria-Hungary, but he held this post for only a few months, resigning after Garfield was assassinated.

Still active in politics, Phelps was re-elected to Congress in 1883, 1885 and again in 1887.

== Art collector ==
In 1886 the Phelps mansion was completed. At Christmas time the family held a glorious celebration with people from all over the country viewing the mansion for the first time. Phelps' favorite room was a gallery which he had designed himself to hold his priceless collection of art treasures from the ends of the earth.

It was nearly midnight on April 1, 1888 when Phelps, returning to his apartments in Washington, D.C. after an evening with friends, found on the table in his bedroom two telegrams which told him that his mansion in Teaneck, where his family then was, had been totally destroyed by fire, with a loss of nearly all its valuable contents. He disturbed no one upon receiving this startling news, but very early in the morning awakened his secretary, told him what had happened, and said that he was going to take an immediate train for New York. He left on the train without once alluding to the great calamity.

The mansion, once the most beautiful in the area, became known as "Phelps' Ruin" and local residents picnicked near the destroyed home, marveling at what it once had been. Phelps immediately began renovation of the house.

== United States Ambassador to Germany ==
Coat of Arms of Walter William Phelps

In 1889, William Phelps was appointed by president Benjamin Harrison as Envoy Extraordinary and Minister Plenipotentiary to Germany. On October 11, 1889, William Phelps was presented to the German Empress at a gala performance at the Royal Opera House, given in honor of the Czar of Russia. Phelps remained in the post for one year until a case of homesickness prompted his request for a short leave of absence. He sailed for America in September 1890.

In his diary Phelps wrote,

I have come home to rest and enjoy myself. I intend to spend my vacation upon my Teaneck farm. I feel as if I were already a Jersey farmer again. See, there is one of my farm wagons on the pier, ready to take off my luggage and those lusty-looking fellows have come down fresh from Teaneck to give me an early welcome. I expect to live among the trees until I get rested, and then hunt up my friends to see that they have not forgotten me. No Politics this time, only that I shall vote the Republican ticket in Bergen County at the coming election, and soon after return to my official duties at Berlin.

Phelps returned to Germany a year later, remaining in this post until January 1893, when his health began to suffer due to the climate. He traveled south, vacationing in Spain, Morocco, Tunis, Algiers and Italy, hoping the climate would improve his health.

== State judge and final days ==
While Phelps was vacationing, Governor of New Jersey George T. Werts appointed him Judge of the New Jersey Court of Errors and Appeals, then the state's highest court. Turning over the affairs of the legation to his successor, Phelps again returned to the United States to be sworn into his judicial role on June 20, 1893.

In February 1894, Phelps' throat began to trouble him seriously, and the illness confined him to his home for days. He continued to try to keep up with his work and was present until the adjournment of the term. A few days later he traveled to the Hygeia Hotel at Old Point Comfort in Virginia, a resort that in the past had been a place of rest for him.

Phelps became withdrawn and quiet, an attitude brought on by his physical inability to converse. The last entry in his diary is dated April 10, 1894. Phelps moved himself to Hot Springs, Virginia, where he enjoyed a temporary return of strength. Finding no lasting improvement in his health in Hot Springs, Phelps returned to his home in Teaneck on May 18. By May 31 he was bedridden, and in June he lapsed into a coma. He died June 17, 1894.

Hundreds of people lined the streets of Teaneck and Englewood to honor his funeral procession. The trees he had planted himself lined the path of this final journey. At the time of his death, Phelps owned half of what is presently Teaneck. He was interred at Simsbury Cemetery in Simsbury, Connecticut.

U.S. House of Representatives
Preceded by George A. Halsey	Member of the U.S. House of Representatives from New Jersey's 5th congressional district March 4, 1873 – March 3, 1875	Succeeded by Augustus W. Cutler
Preceded by John Hill	Member of the U.S. House of Representatives from New Jersey's 5th congressional district March 4, 1883 – March 3, 1889	Succeeded by Charles D. Beckwith
Diplomatic posts
Preceded by John A. Kasson	United States Ambassador to Austria-Hungary; May 5, 1881 – June 30, 1882	Succeeded by Alphonso Taft
Preceded by George H. Pendleton	United States Ambassador to Germany; September 26, 1889 – June 4, 1893	Succeeded by Theodore Runyon
