= John Hill (New Jersey politician) =

American politician

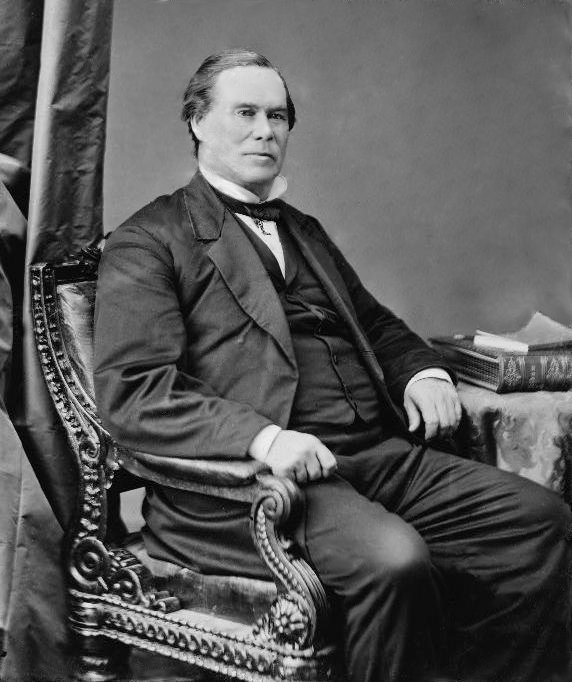

Member of the U.S. House of Representatives from New Jersey's 4th district
- In office March 4, 1867 – March 3, 1873
- Preceded by: Andrew J. Rogers
- Succeeded by: Robert Hamilton

Member of the U.S. House of Representatives from New Jersey's 5th district
- In office March 4, 1881 – March 3, 1883
- Preceded by: Charles H. Voorhis
- Succeeded by: William W. Phelps

Member of the New Jersey General Assembly
- In office 1861-1862; 1866

Personal details
- Born: June 10, 1821 Catskill, New York, USA
- Died: July 24, 1884 (aged 63) Boonton, New Jersey, USA
- Party: Republican
- Spouse: Phebe J. Carman Hill
- Profession: Politician, Clerk, Bookkeeper, Merchant, Justice of the Peace

John Hill (June 10, 1821 – July 24, 1884) was an American clerk, bookkeeper, merchant and Republican Party politician who represented New Jersey's 4th congressional district from 1867 to 1873, and New Jersey's 5th congressional district from 1881 to 1883.

== Biography ==
Born in Catskill, New York, Hill attended private schools as a child. He was employed as a bank clerk and learned bookkeeping in Catskill. He moved to Boonton, New Jersey, in 1845 and was employed as a bookkeeper and paymaster. He later engaged in mercantile pursuits, was postmaster of Boonton from 1849 to 1853, was a member of the town committee from 1852 to 1856 and was Justice of the Peace from 1856 to 1861. During the Civil War, Hill took an active part in raising troops for the Union Army. He served in the New Jersey General Assembly in 1861, 1862 and 1866, serving as Speaker of the House in the last year, was an unsuccessful candidate for the New Jersey Senate in 1862 and was again a member of the town committee from 1863 to 1867.

He was elected a Republican to the United States House of Representatives in 1866, serving from 1867 to 1873. There, Hill was chairman of the Committee on Expenditures in the Department of the Interior from 1871 to 1873. He was a delegate to the 1868 Republican National Convention and resumed mercantile pursuits from 1873 to 1876 when he retired. He served in the New Jersey Senate from 1875 to 1877 and was elected back to the United States House of Representatives in 1880, serving again from 1881 to 1883, not being a candidate for renomination in 1882. Hill died in Boonton on July 24, 1884, and was interred in Boonton Cemetery in Boonton.

U.S. House of Representatives
Preceded by Andrew J. Rogers	Member of the U.S. House of Representatives from New Jersey's 4th congressional district March 4, 1867 – March 3, 1873	Succeeded by Robert Hamilton
Preceded by Charles H. Voorhis	Member of the U.S. House of Representatives from New Jersey's 5th congressional district March 4, 1881 – March 3, 1883	Succeeded by William W. Phelps
