= Silas Condict =

American politician

Silas Condict (March 7, 1738 – September 6, 1801) was an American farmer, prominent surveyor, and large landowner from Morris County, New Jersey. He served as a New Jersey delegate to the Continental Congress from 1781 to 1783. Later, he served a number of terms in the State Assembly, and was its Speaker in 1792-1794 and in 1797. His name can be found in archived Congressional records @ " A Biographical Congressional Directory, 1774-1903" (WASHINGTON: 1903)@ page 467 (also naming Dr. John Condict, Silas Condict, Jr. and Sr., and a nephew, Dr. Lewis Condict), found at Google books and at Archive.org. It is found here also:, one of many Congressional Archive sources showing the Condict family.

Silas' great grandfather, John, the Norman ancestor, is footnoted by archivists in the Archives for the State of New Jersey, First Series, V. XV at the index re: the HorseNeck Indian Land Purchase where his name is misspelled as Candet and Canduct, however, both times the surname is corrected to Condict by archivists at pages: 530 (No. 1) & 533 (No. 24); the book can be found at archive.org. Silas Condict died in Morristown, New Jersey and is buried in the Presbyterian Church Cemetery, Morristown. His nephew, Lewis Condict, and great-grandson, Augustus W. Cutler, would later serve in the U.S. Congress. Sources: The United States Magazine and Democratic Review,1839, January–June, No. VIII, at page 603-604. 1st-11th Annual Reports DAR. Senate documents (United States Congress, Senate). Government Printing Office: Washington, DC. Also, Hoskins' Men From Morris County NJ Who Served in Rev, pg 49; SAR Graves Registry by KP Bgbertson. Silas Condict is also found in the First Presbyterian Church of Morristown, NJ records: at pages 59–67.

There is a large park (over 1500 acres) in Morris County, named for him.
