= Morristown District =

- U.S. National Register of Historic Places
- U.S. Historic district
- New Jersey Register of Historic Places
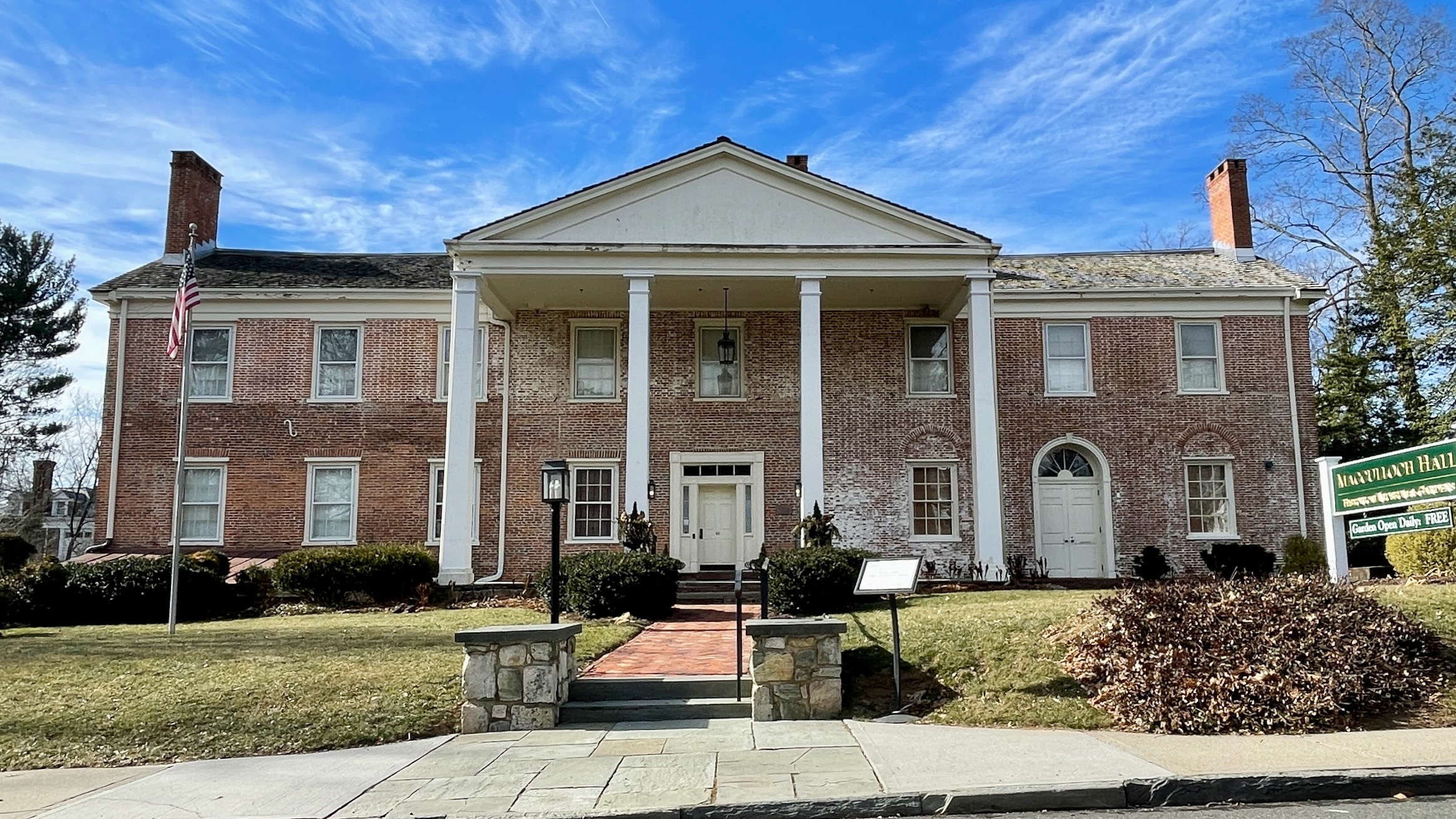
- Macculloch Hall

- Location within Morris County, New Jersey Location within New Jersey Location within the United States
- Location: Roughly bounded by the cemetery, King Pl., Madison and Colles Aves., DeHart St., and N. Park Pl. Morristown, New Jersey
- Coordinates: 40°47′38″N 74°28′51″W
- Area: 213 acres (86 ha)
- Architectural style: Greek Revival, Late Victorian, Classical Revival, Art Deco
- MPS: Morristown Multiple Resource Area
- NRHP reference No.: 73001126 (original); 86003109 (increase)
- NJRHP No.: 2192; 2193

Significant dates
- Added to NRHP: October 30, 1973
- Boundary increase: November 13, 1986
- Designated NJRHP: September 6, 1973; September 11, 1986

The Morristown District, also known as the Morristown Historic District, is a historic district in the town of Morristown in Morris County, New Jersey. It was added to the National Register of Historic Places on October 30, 1973, for its significance in architecture, communications, education, military, politics, religion, social history, and transportation.

The initial district listing had 50 contributing buildings, including the Thomas Nast Home and the Dr. Lewis Condict House, which were previously listed individually on the NRHP, and the Morristown Green. The district boundary was increased from 93 acres (38 ha) to 213 acres (86 ha) as part of the Morristown Multiple Resource Area (MRA) in 1986 and now has 352 contributing buildings, including the Morristown station and the Morris County Courthouse, which were previously listed individually.

== History and description ==
Macculloch Hall was built in 1810 by George and Louisa Macculloch and features Federal architecture. The brick building is the home of the Macculloch Hall Historical Museum. The Vail Mansion was built in 1918 by Theodore N. Vail, then president of AT&T. Built of granite and marble, it features Florentine architecture. Vail never occupied the building and he donated it to the town. Morristown and Morris Township Library was built in 1917, with funding from Grinnell Willis, local textile merchant. St. Peter's Episcopal Church was built by the architectural firm McKim, Mead & White. Designed by architect J. Cleaveland Cady, the South Street Presbyterian Church was built in 1878. The First Presbyterian Church was built 1893–1894 featuring Romanesque Revival style. The Kedge was built in 1870 as a summer cottage and features Stick style.

== Gallery ==
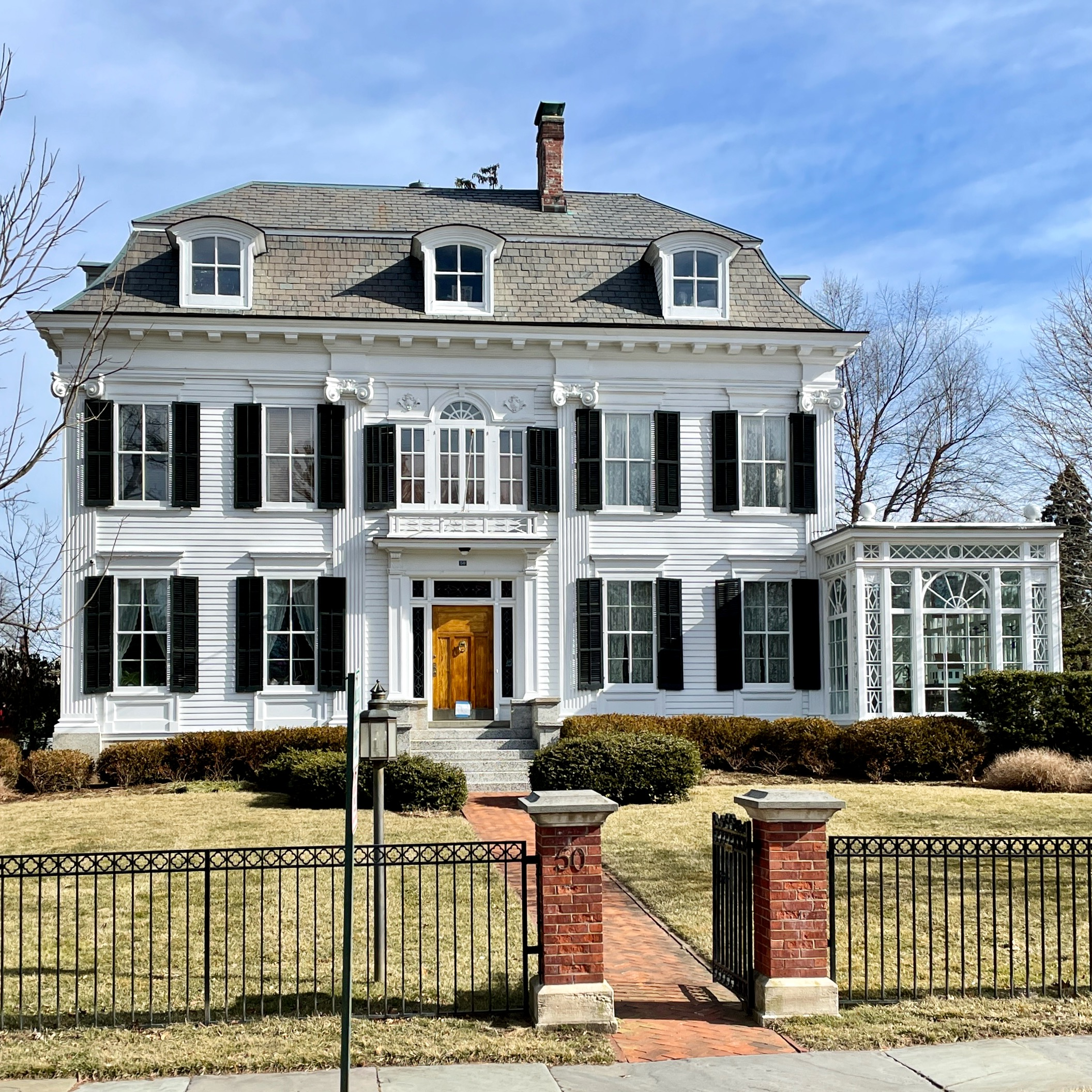
Thomas Nast Home

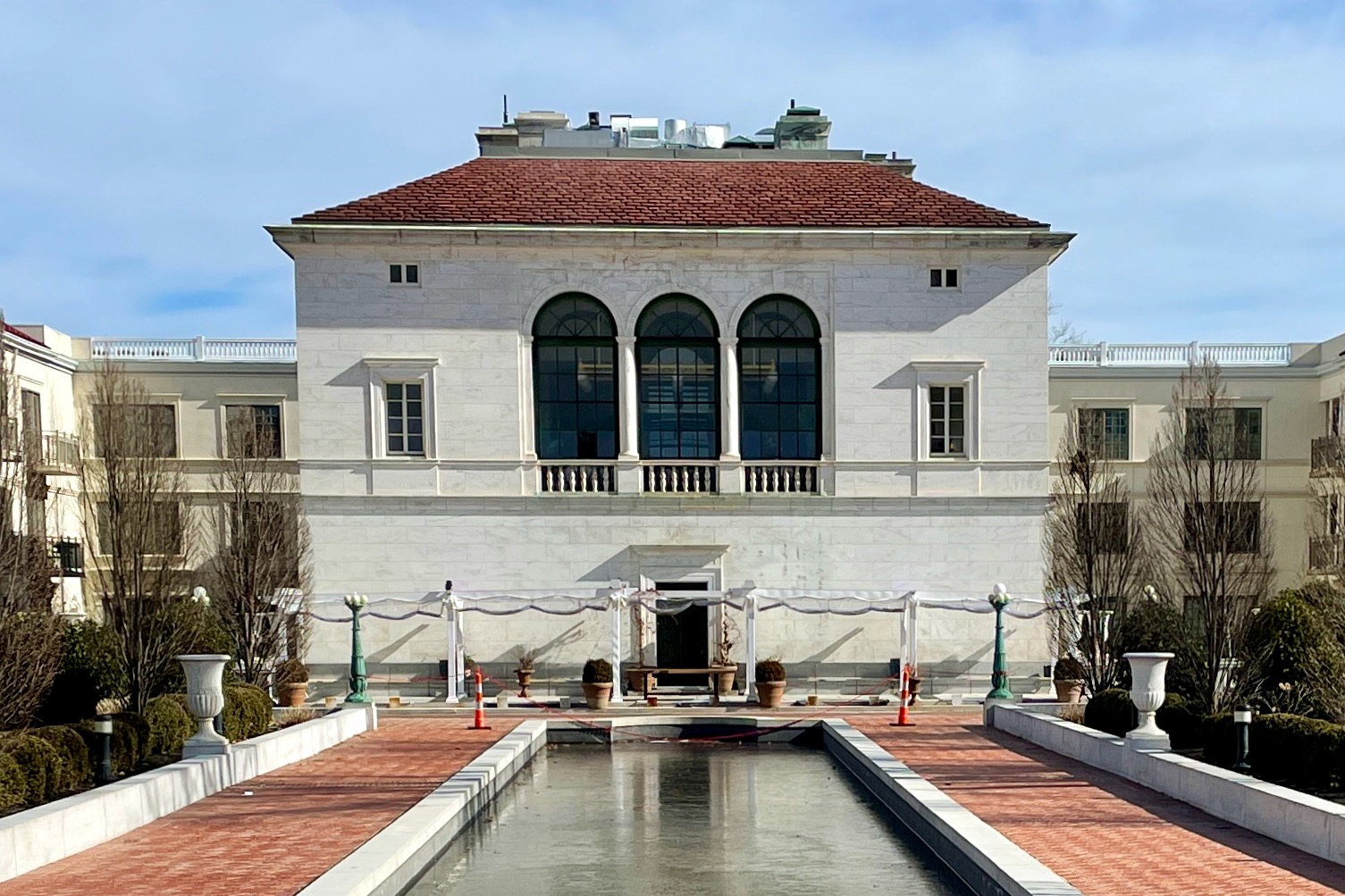
The Vail Mansion, also known as the Morristown Municipal Building

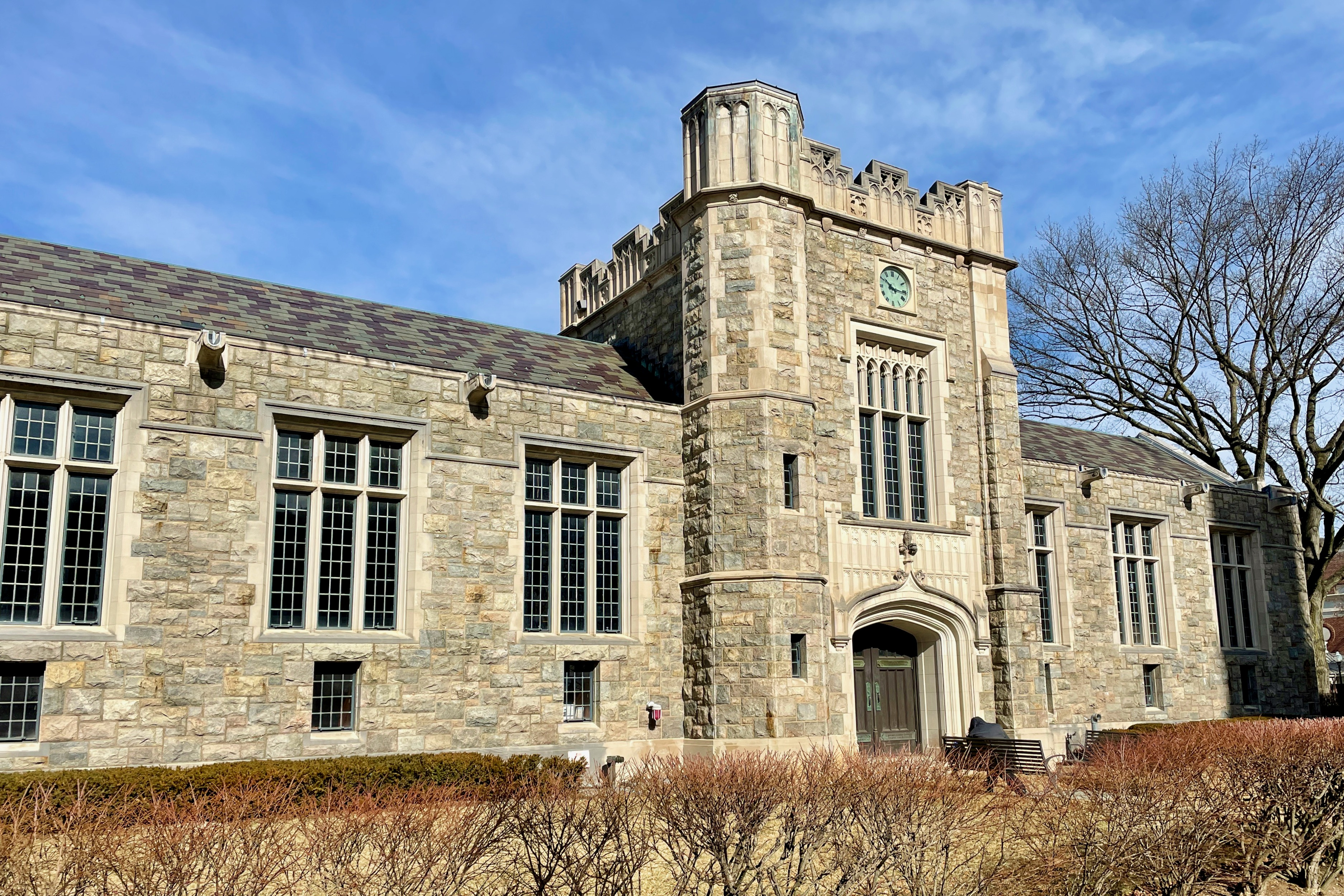
The Morristown & Morris Township Library

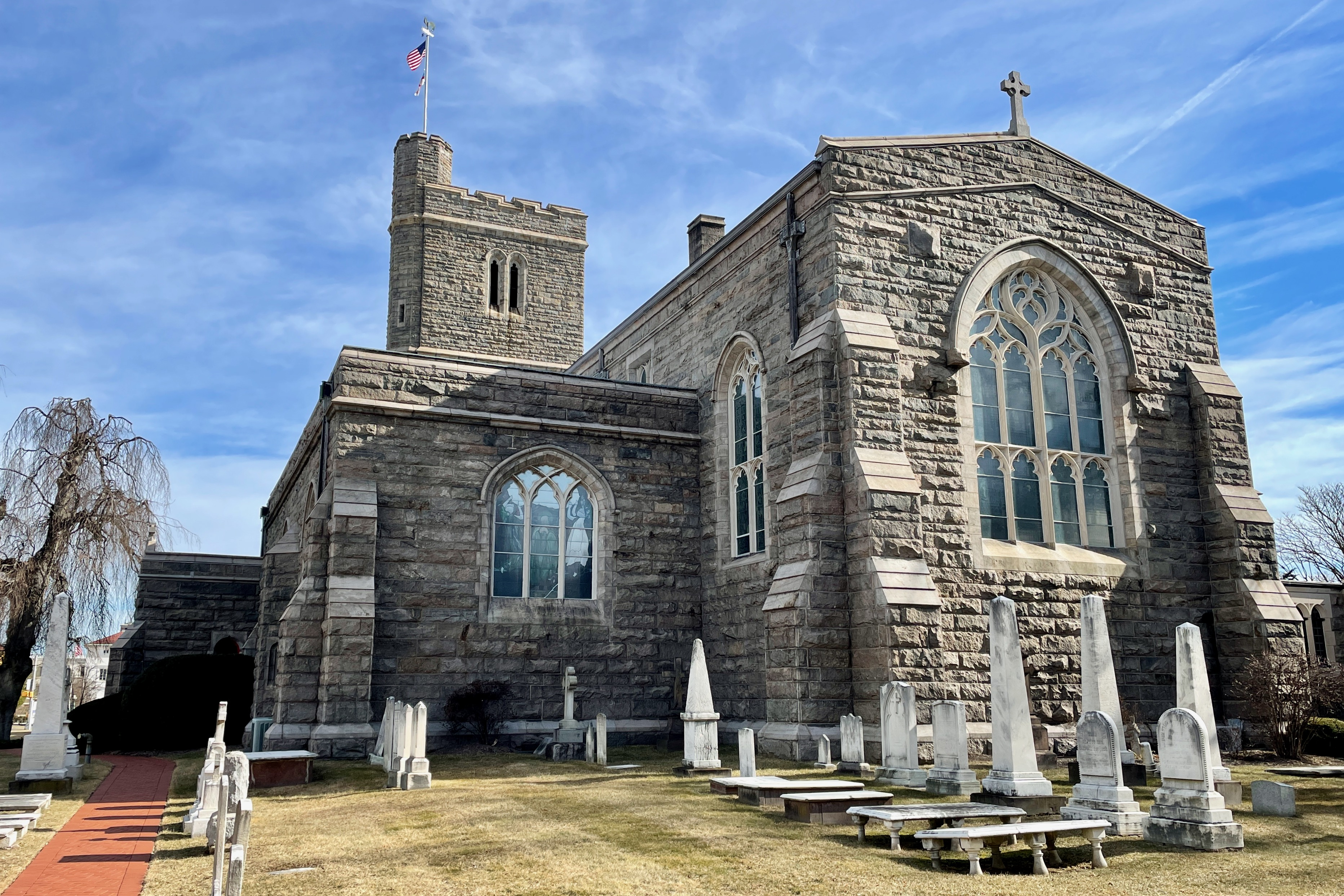
St. Peter's Episcopal Church

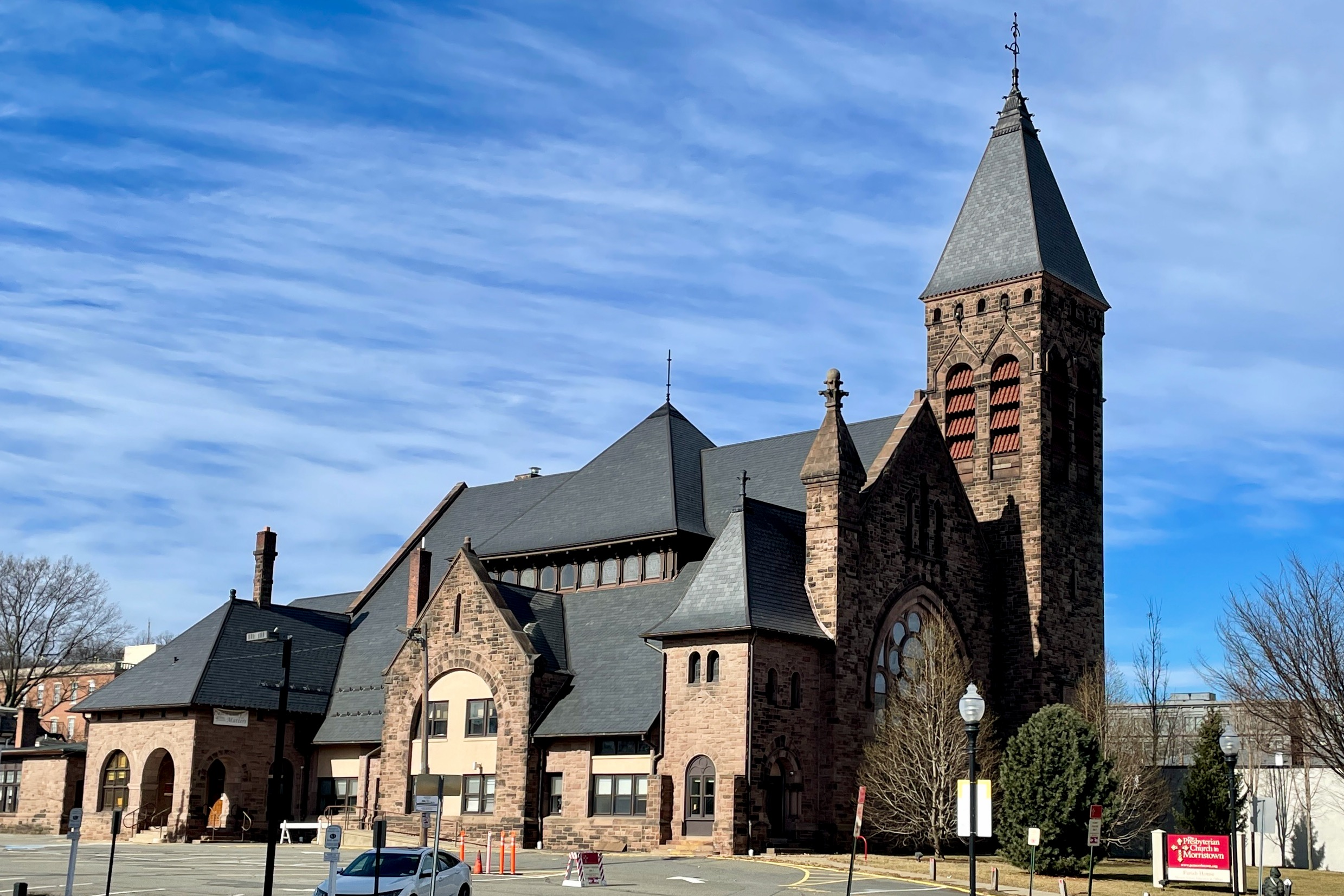
South Street Presbyterian Church

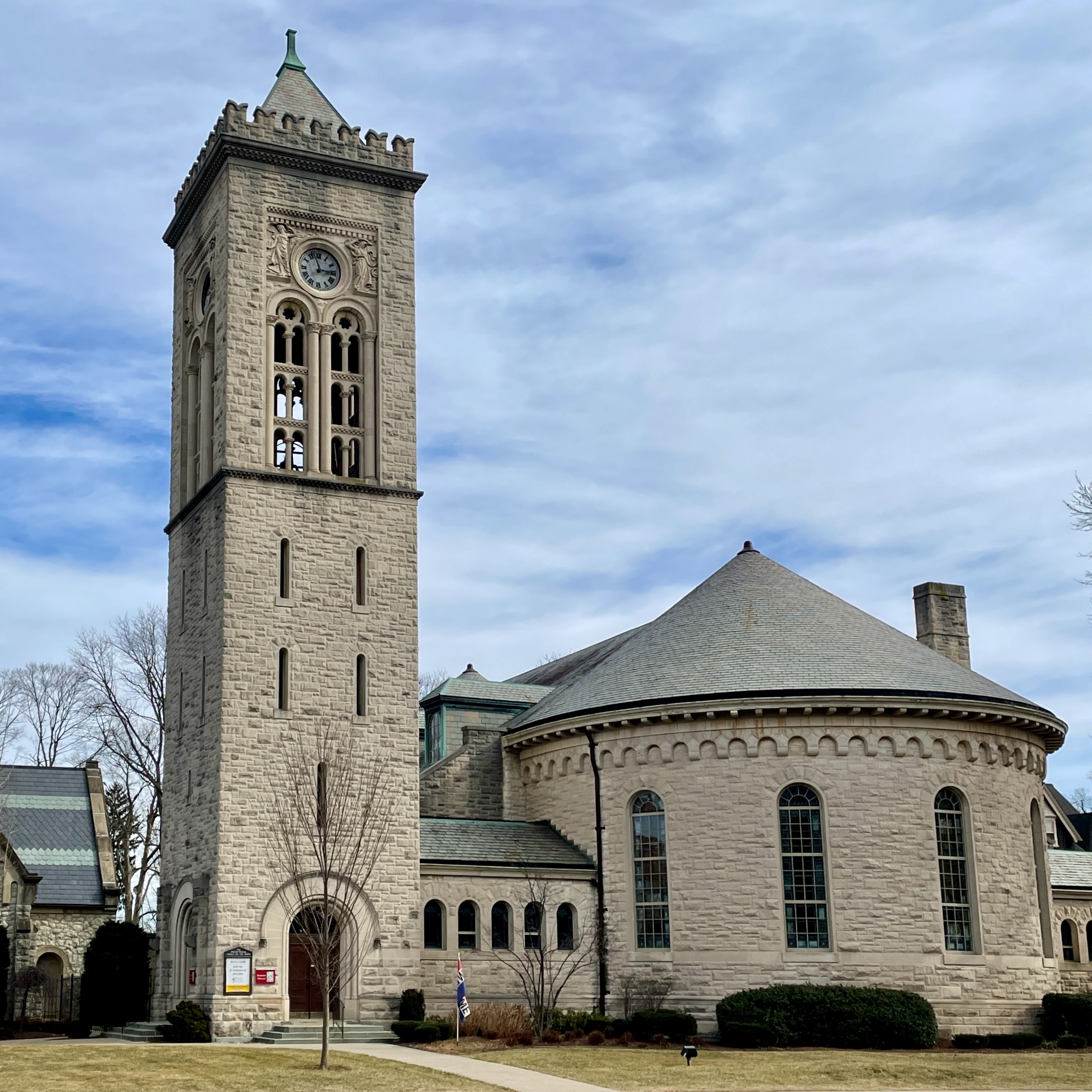
First Presbyterian Church

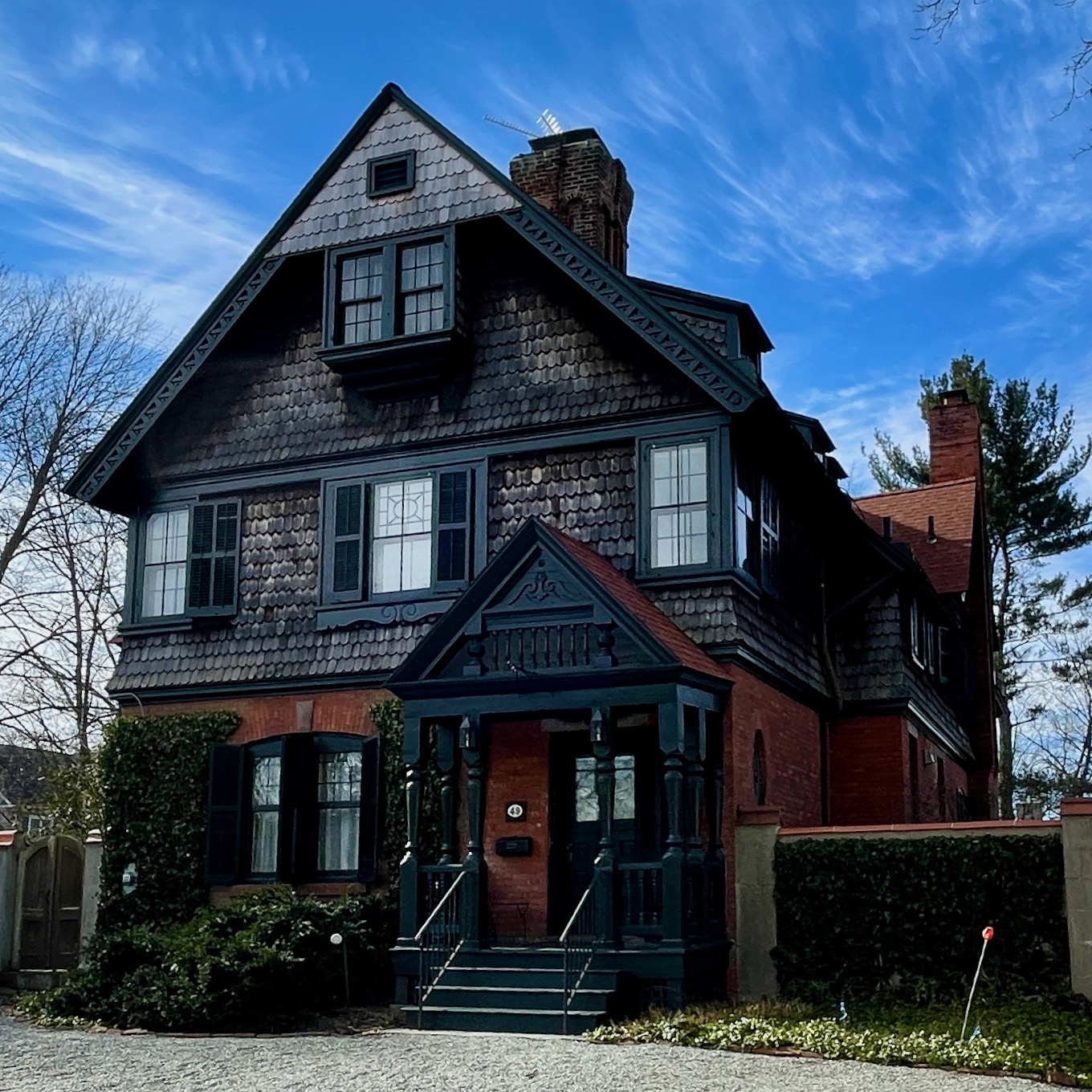
The Kedge

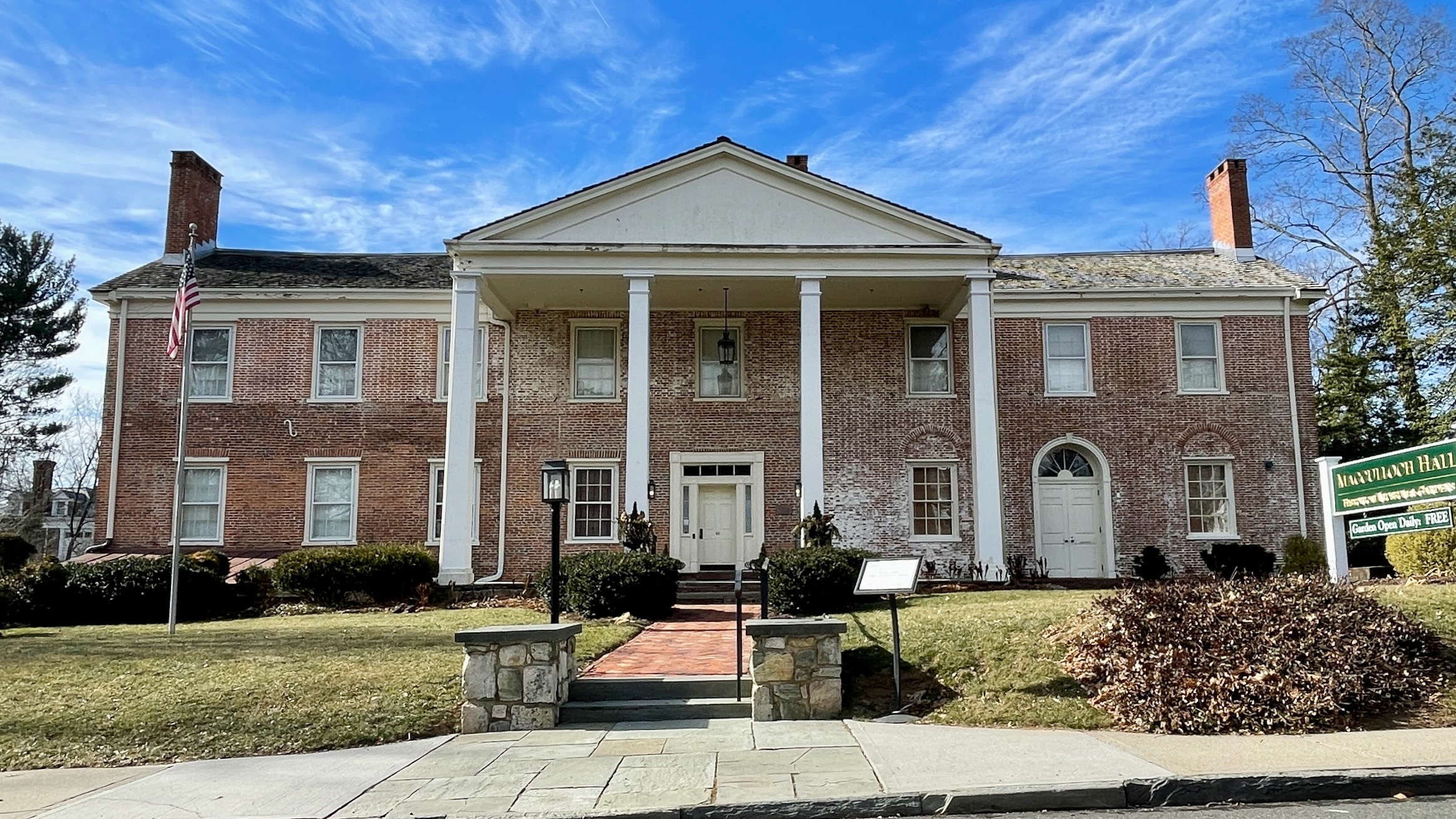
Macculloch Hall

== See also ==
- National Register of Historic Places listings in Morris County, New Jersey
