= First Presbyterian Church (Morristown, New Jersey) =

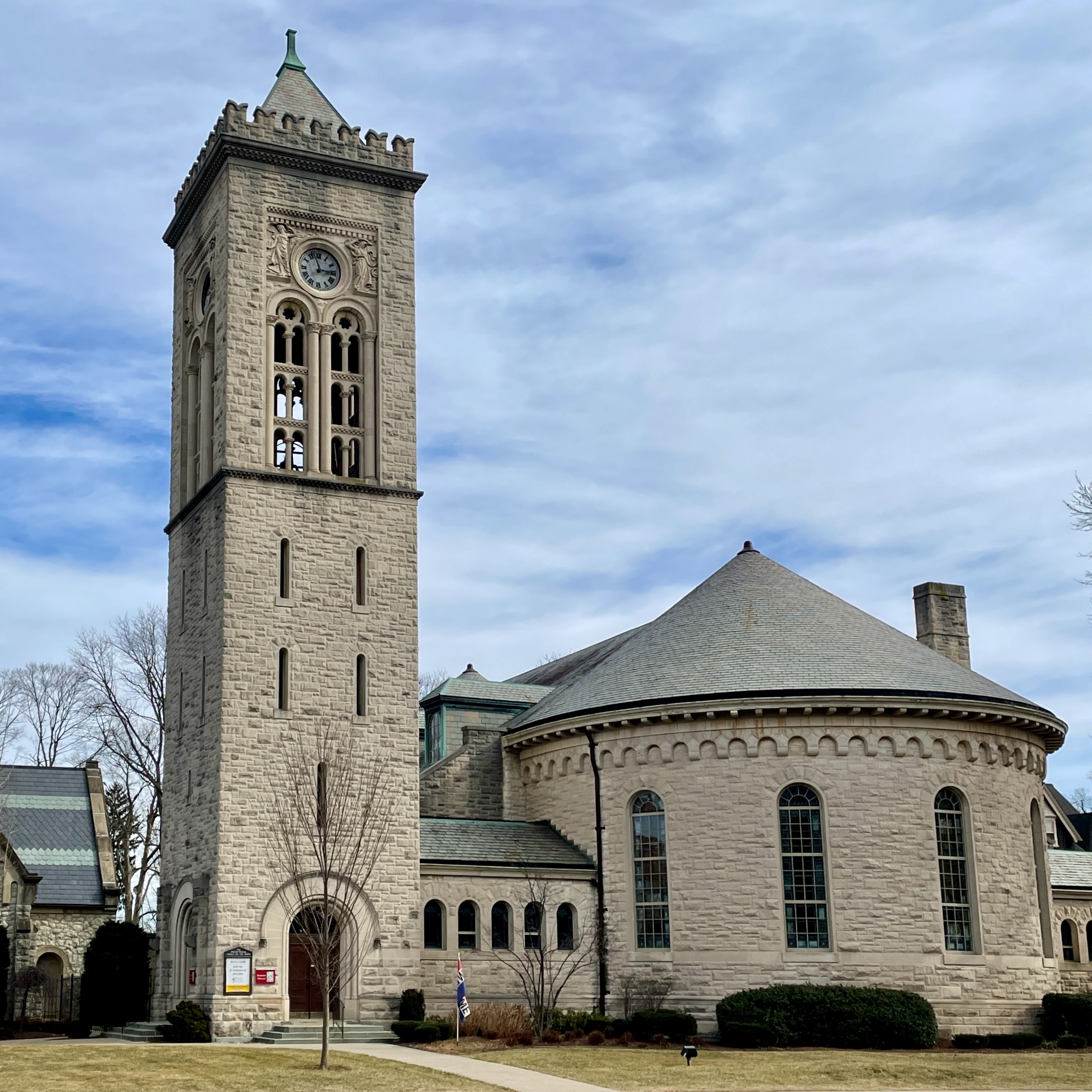
- First Presbyterian Church in Morristown

- Location within Morris County, New Jersey Location within New Jersey Location within the United States
- 40°47′51″N 74°28′47″W
- Location: 57 E. Park Place; Morristown, New Jersey
- Country: United States
- Denomination: Presbyterian

Architecture
- Architectural type: Romanesque Revival architecture
- Completed: 1894
- First Presbyterian Church
- U.S. Historic district – Contributing property
- Part of: Morristown District (ID73001126)
- Designated CP: October 30, 1973

The First Presbyterian Church is located at 57 E. Park Place in the town of Morristown in Morris County, New Jersey. The congregation started worship here in 1733. It received a royal charter from George II of Great Britain in 1756. The current church building was erected in 1894. The stone building features Romanesque Revival architecture and works by Louis Comfort Tiffany. The church was added to the National Register of Historic Places, listed as a contributing property of the Morristown District, on October 30, 1973.

== History ==
=== Second Presbyterian Church ===
In 1840, the congregation decided to split in two, and formed the Second Presbyterian Church. In 1863, the name was changed to the South Street Presbyterian Church at Morristown. After a fire destroyed the original church building, a new stone church was built in 1878, designed by architect J. Cleaveland Cady in Romanesque Revival style. The building is also listed as a contributing property of the Morristown District. In 1925, the two congregations merged to form the Presbyterian Church in Morristown.

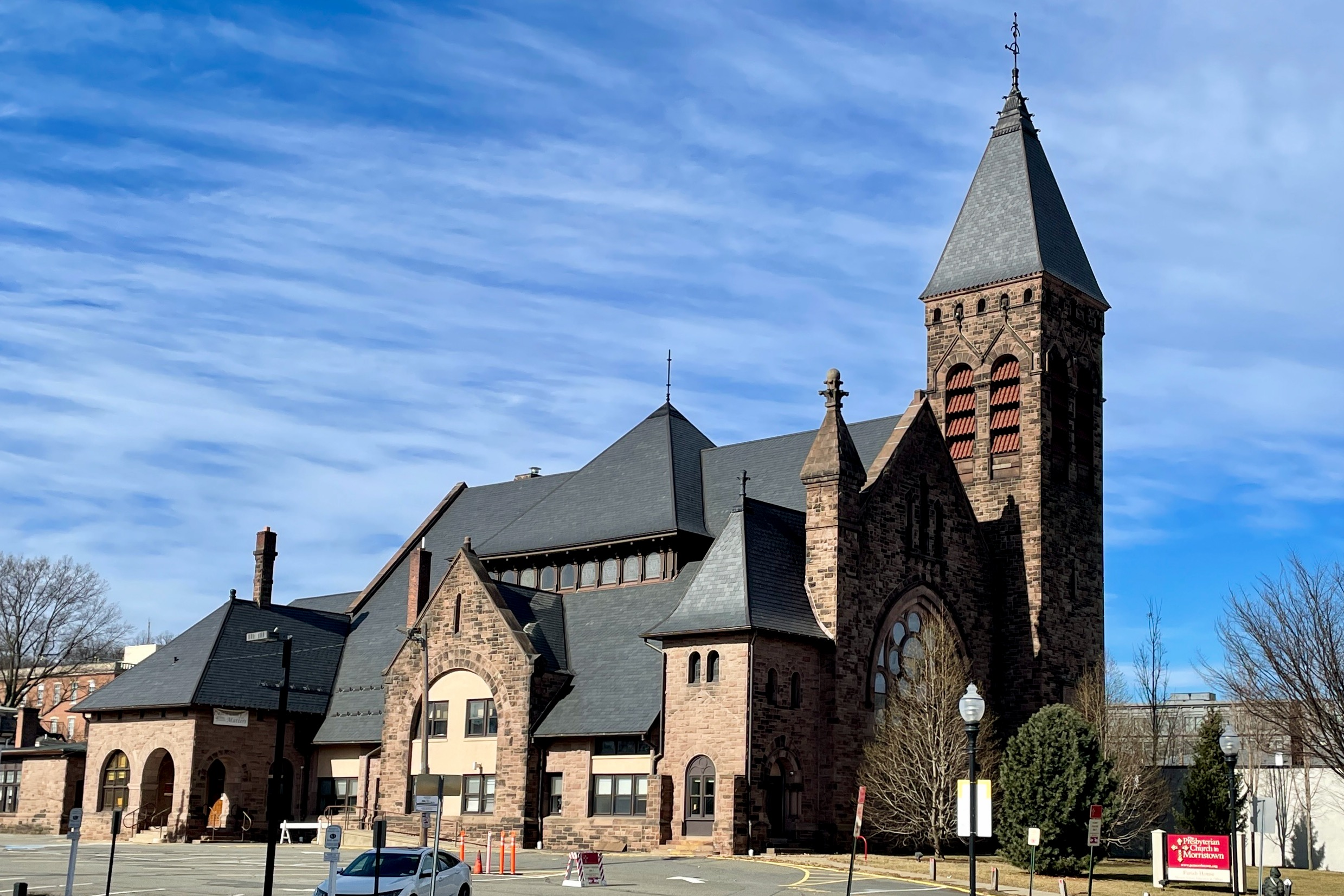
South Street Presbyterian Church

== See also ==
- First Presbyterian Churchyard
- List of Presbyterian churches in New Jersey
- National Register of Historic Places listings in Morris County, New Jersey
