= Blanc =

Blanc is a surname of French origin, meaning white. Notable people with the surname include:

- Adolphe-Edmond Blanc (1799–1850), French politician
- Antoine Blanc (1792–1860), first Archbishop of New Orleans
- Antoine le Blanc (19th century), French immigrant to the United States, celebrated murderer
- Bertrand Blanc (b. 1973), French ski mountaineer
- Charles Blanc (1813–1882), French art critic
- Didier Blanc (b. 1984), French ski mountaineer
- Edmond Blanc (1856–1920), French politician
- Erika Blanc (b. 1942), Italian actress
- Ernest Blanc (1923–2010), opera singer
- François Blanc (1806–1877) French entrepreneur and operator of casinos
- Frédéric Blanc (born 1967), French composer, organist and improvisor
- Georges Blanc (pilot) (1887–1960), French World War I flying ace
- Greg Blanc, American politician
- Henri Blanc (zoologist) (1859–1930), Swiss zoologist
- Hippolyte Blanc (1844–1917), Scottish architect
- Jacques Blanc (b. 1939), French politician
- Jennifer Blanc (b. 1974), American actress
- Julien Blanc (b. 1988), Dating coach, self-help speaker
- Laurent Blanc (b. 1965), French manager and former footballer
- Leandro Blanc (b. 1993), Argentine boxer
- Louis Blanc (1811–1882), French politician and historian
- Marie-Félix Blanc (1859–1882), French heiress
- Martine Blanc (b. 1944), French children's book author and illustrator
- Mel Blanc (1908–1989), American voice actor of Looney Tunes and Merrie Melodies
- Michel Blanc (1952–2024), French actor
- Patrick Blanc (b. 1953), French botanist
- Patrick Blanc (ski mountaineer), (b. 1972), French ski mountaineer
- Raymond Blanc (b. 1949), French chef
- Serge Blanc (footballer) (born 1972), French footballer
- Serge Blanc (violinist) (1929–2013), French violinist, conductor and academic
- Sophie Blanc (born 1968), French politician

== See also ==
- Le Blanc (real name Emilia), the Deceiver, a playable champion character in the multiplayer online battle arena video game League of Legends
- Blanc, a character in the video game series Hyperdimension Neptunia
- blanc, a BL manga by Asumiko Nakamura and sequel to Classmates
