= Antoine le Blanc =

French murderer in the United States

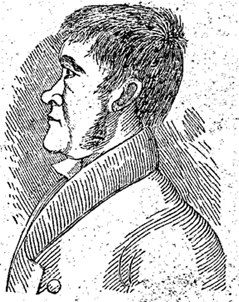
Engraving of Antoine le Blanc from S.P. Hull's published account of the trial.

Antoine le Blanc (c. 1801 – September 6, 1833) was a 19th-century murderer and a French immigrant to the United States.

== Early life and arrival in the United States ==
Le Blanc was born in Château-Salins in 1801. As a young man he developed a reputation for drinking and gambling. He spent several years working as a laborer in Bistroff where he became infatuated with a young woman named Mary Smicht. The Smicht family refused to consider a marriage until he could "find a place for a settlement".

In 1833 Le Blanc went to New York seeking better employment. In April, a few weeks after his arrival in the country, Judge Samuel Sayre hired le Blanc from the John P. Fusier boardinghouse at 75 Fulton Street, New York City to work as a gardener on his property in Morristown, New Jersey. In May 1833 le Blanc killed Sayre by hitting him in the back with an ax, killed his wife Sarah Sayre with a club, and killed their servant Phoebe, who may have been a slave. He proceeded to ransack the house for valuables.

== Execution ==
After the crime was discovered, le Blanc was tracked down, captured and tried. Judge Gabriel Ford ordered ". . .Friday the sixth day of September next, and that you be taken from the said jail on that day to a place of execution, and then and there, between the hours of 11 o'clock in the forenoon and 3 o'clock in the afternoon of the same day, that you be hung by the neck till you are dead. And it is further considered by the Court, that after the execution is done, your body be delivered to Dr. J.W. Canfield, a surgeon, for dissection." Local businessman and engineer Stephen Vail helped modify the town gallows so that it would pull le Blanc's body up rather than allowing it to drop down. Le Blanc was hanged on the Morristown Green before over ten thousand witnesses on September 6, 1833. Vail wrote in his diary of the execution "The sheriff cut the rope and the weight dropped and he went up 8 feet and struggled 2 minutes by my stop watch he hung 35 minutes and was let down into his coffin. . ."

== Post-mortem experimentation ==
After his death, le Blanc was taken to the Morris County Courthouse and experimented on with Galvanic batteries by physicist Dr. Joseph Henry, Dr. Samuel Ladd Howell of Princeton University, and others. Le Blanc's body was skinned, tanned and made into "several articles" including a wallet. A death mask was made. The death mask of Antoine le Blanc and a wallet allegedly made from le Blanc's skin were purchased by Carl Scherzer, a collector of 19th-century artifacts, and donated by his heirs to the Morristown and Morris Township Library.

In 1893 during excavations on the Morris County Courthouse grounds workmen discovered a box containing human bones that showed signs of dissection and experimentation.

== Legacy ==
A play based on the trial of Antoine le Blanc written by William Van Nostran was staged in the Morris County Courthouse in 1994.
