= Macculloch Hall Historical Museum =

Historic house and museum in Morristown, NJ

- Macculloch Hall
- U.S. National Register of Historic Places
- U.S. Historic district – Contributing property
- New Jersey Register of Historic Places
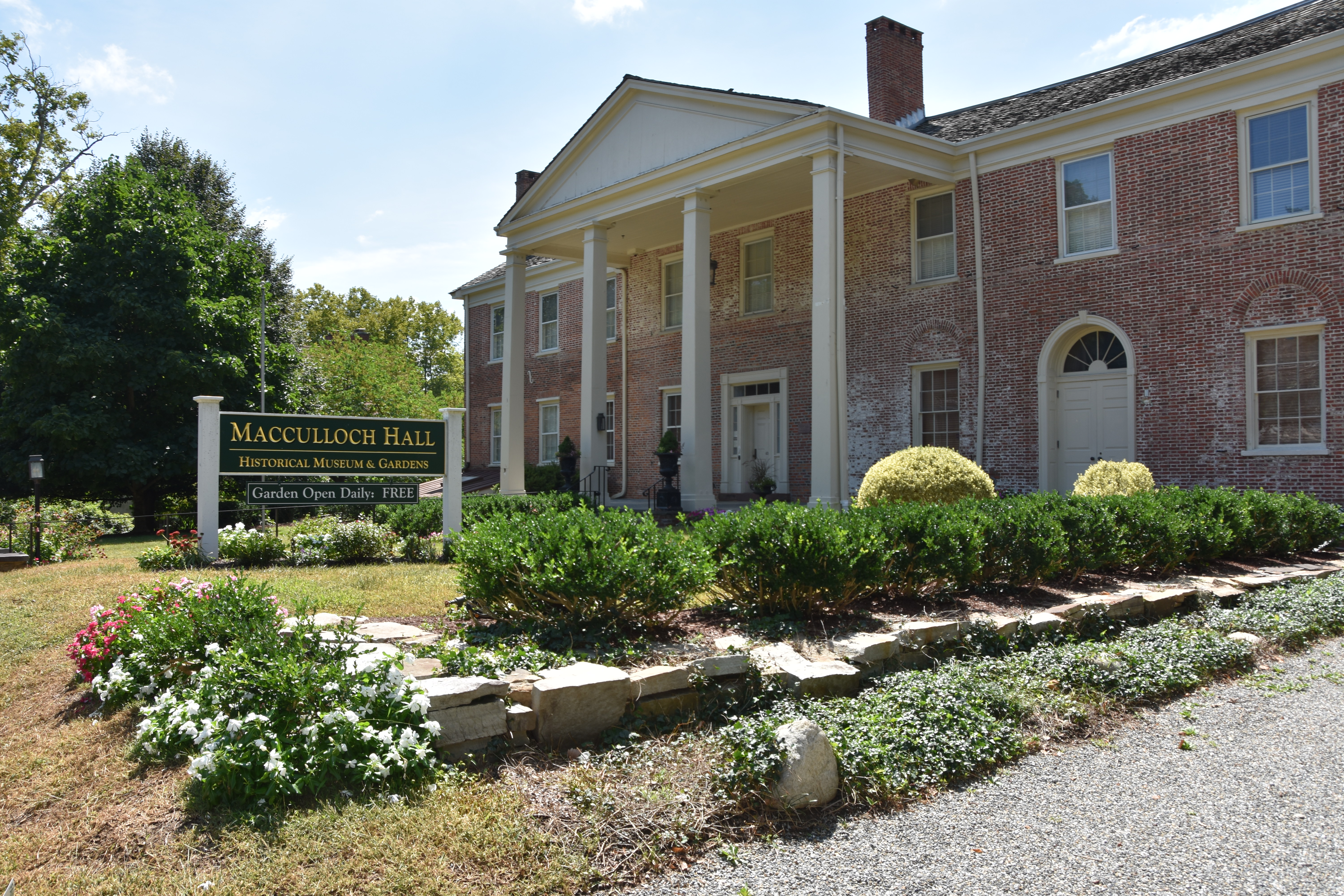
- Front entrance of the house today

- Location within Morris County, New Jersey
- Location: 45 MacCulloch Ave, Morristown, New Jersey
- Coordinates: 40°47′31″N 74°28′52″W
- Built: 1810
- Architectural style: Federal architecture
- Restored: 1950-55
- Restored by: W. Parsons Todd
- NRHP reference No.: 73001126 (original); 86003109 (increase)

Significant dates
- Added to NRHP: October 30, 1973
- Boundary increase: November 13, 1986

Macculloch Hall Historical Museum is an historic house museum in the historic district of Morristown, Morris County, New Jersey. Built in 1810 as a family home by George and Louisa Macculloch, it has operated as the Macculloch Hall Historical Museum since its purchase and preservation by W. Parsons Todd (1877-1976) in 1950. It holds and displays Todd's personal collection of European and American fine and decorative art and the largest collection of work by artist and political cartoonist Thomas Nast (1840-1902). The grounds also feature a two-acre formal garden that is open to the public seven days a week.

== History ==
Macculloch Hall began as a one-story stone bank house on a 26-acre parcel of land owned by General John Doughty, a major in George Washington’s army during the Revolutionary War. The stone building is believed to have been built circa 1765.

British immigrants George and Louisa Macculloch purchased the property in 1810 and built on that foundation the first iteration of Macculloch Hall, a Federal style brick mansion. The stone walls of the original house on the property were strong and George decided to use them as a basement kitchen in the new home. It was the first major brick structure in Morristown. The home was expanded in 1812 and 1819, tripling its size. The 1819 addition was built to be used as a Latin school for boys and operated for fifteen years as a schoolroom along with dormitories and rooms above for the students and teachers. It was then used for services by Episcopalians who had no church in the town at the time.

The descendants of the family listed the house for sale in 1949 and convinced Todd to buy and preserve it as a historic site. Todd was a friend of the family and a devoted resident of Morristown: he was a member of the Board of Education, the Board of Aldermen, and mayor twice. The home was incorporated as a nonprofit public museum in 1950 and went underwent several major restorations through 1955.

=== Location ===
The house is located in the historic district of Morristown at 45 MacCulloch Avenue. MacCulloch Ave began as a private lane in the front of the mansion before it became a public street, it used to be called Doughty Street. The Thomas Nast Home is across the street.

== Early residents ==
=== 1806- 1949 ===
George P. Macculloch (1775-1858) and Louisa Edwina Saunderson (1785-1863) were married in London in 1804. In 1806 they immigrated with their two young children, Frances Law (1801-1859) and Mary Louisa (1804-1888), to the United States. In 1810, George purchased 26 acres in Morristown on which they built Macculloch Hall.

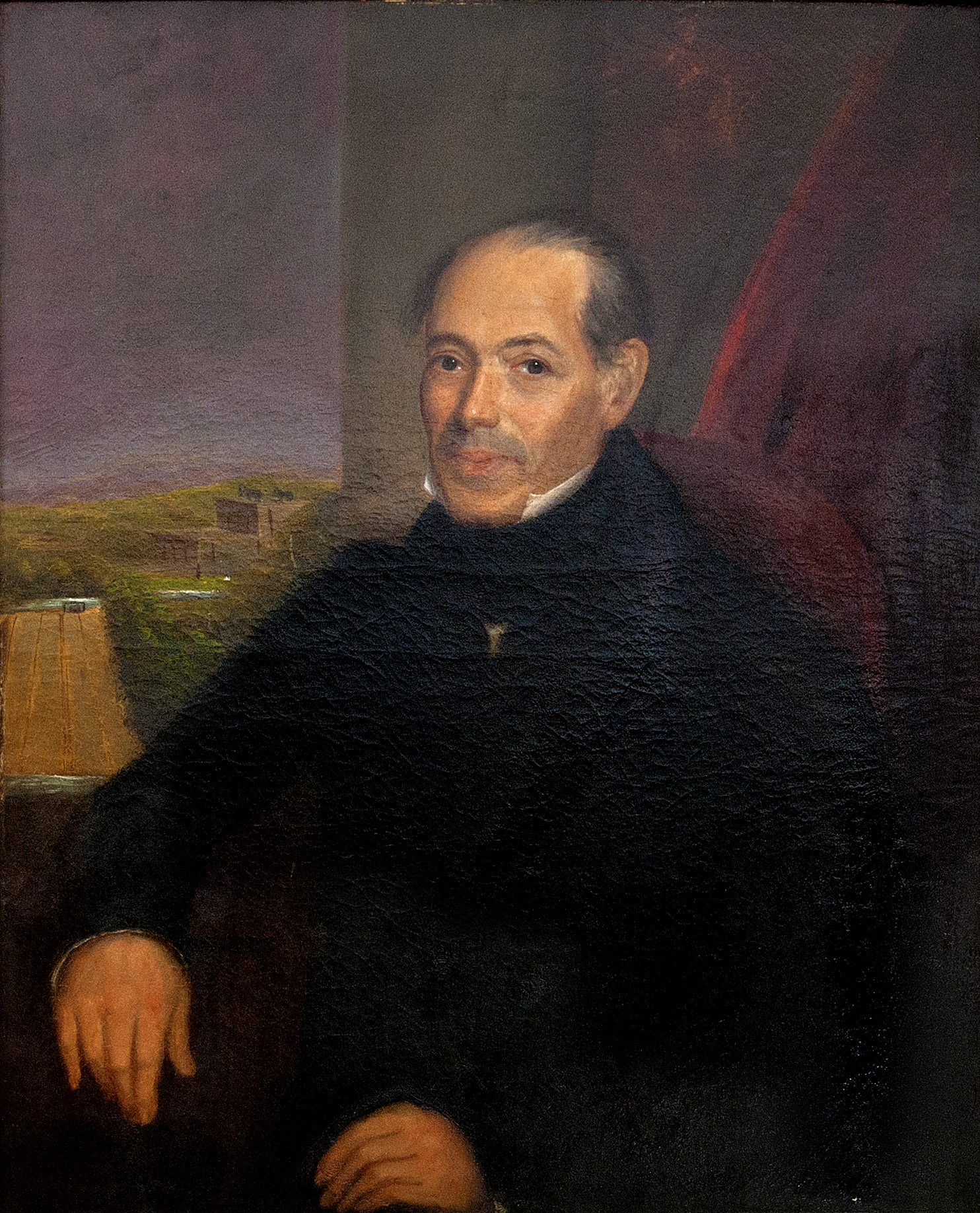
A portrait of George Perrot Macculloch that is on display in the museum

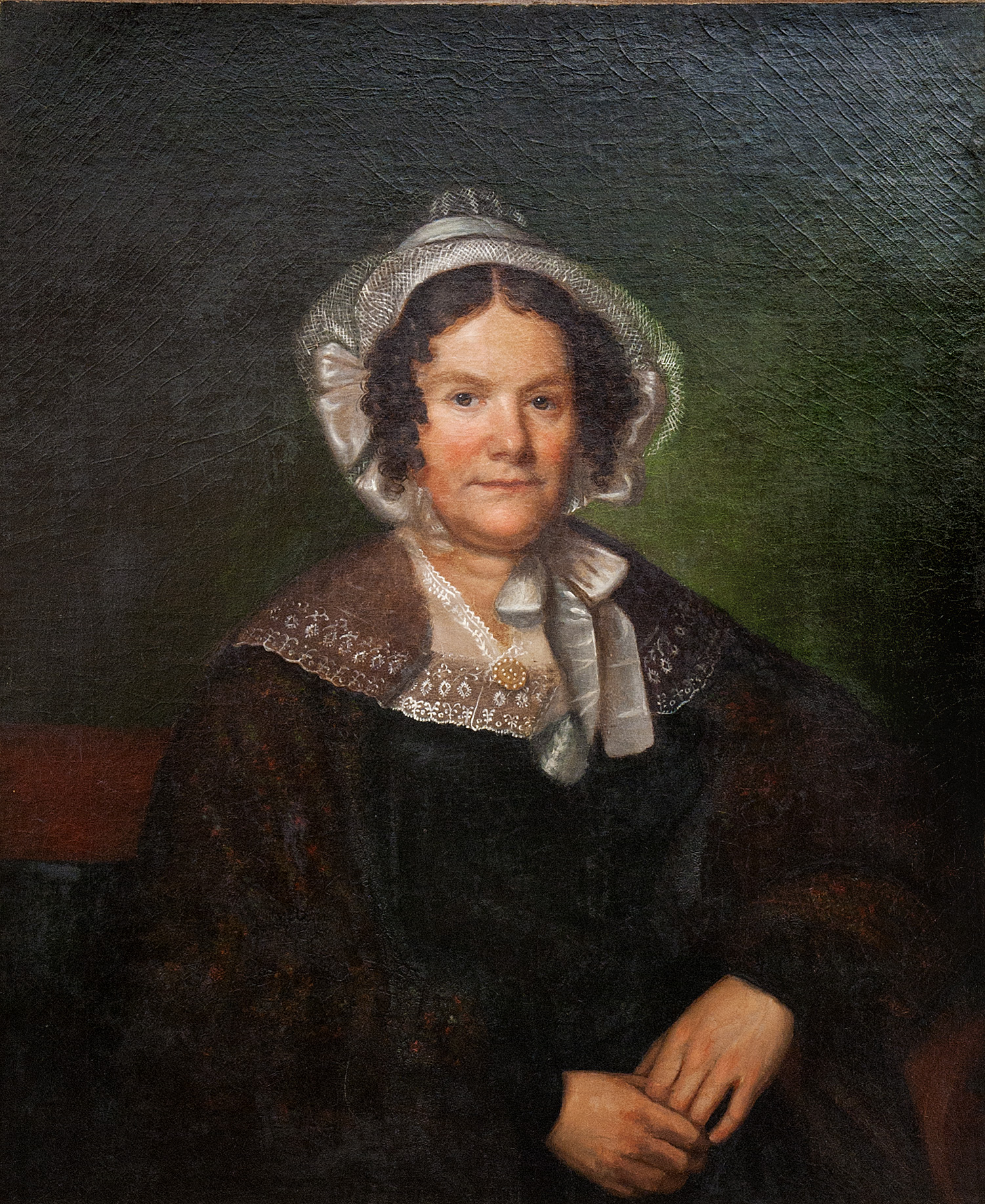
A portrait of Louisa Edwina Macculloch that is on display in the museum

In the early 1820s, George started working on an idea that would become the Morris Canal. The idea came to him while he was fishing on Lake Hopatcong and he sketched out the preliminary plans for the canal. He held meetings in Macculloch Hall with his agricultural society to develop the idea further, writing several newspaper articles outlining the need for the canal to help ship coal and working with James Renwick, a professor at Columbia University, to develop a system to raise and lower canal boats on inclined planes. In 1822 he was appointed by the state as one of three commissioners to explore the project. Work begun on the canal in 1825, finishing in 1829 and it would remain in operation until almost a century later in 1924, as it was no longer profitable due to the use of railways.

Louisa helped her husband run their short-lived school and is credited with helping found St. Peter's Episcopal Church (Morristown, New Jersey) by holding services in the house when there was no physical church. She was heavily involved with charitable women's groups such as the Female Charitable Society (in 1947 it changed its name to Family Service of Morris County) and the Fragment Society. In 1819 she was elected as the 2nd Directress of the Female Charitable Society and 1st Directress in 1930. She was not a founding member but she served from 1819 until her death in 1863. Four generations of Macculloch women served in the society. Her daughter Mary Louisa was a member from age seventeen until her death in 1888 and also served as both 1st and 2nd Directress in that time. Mary Louisa's daughter, Frances Miller Hitchcock, took up the position after she stepped down.

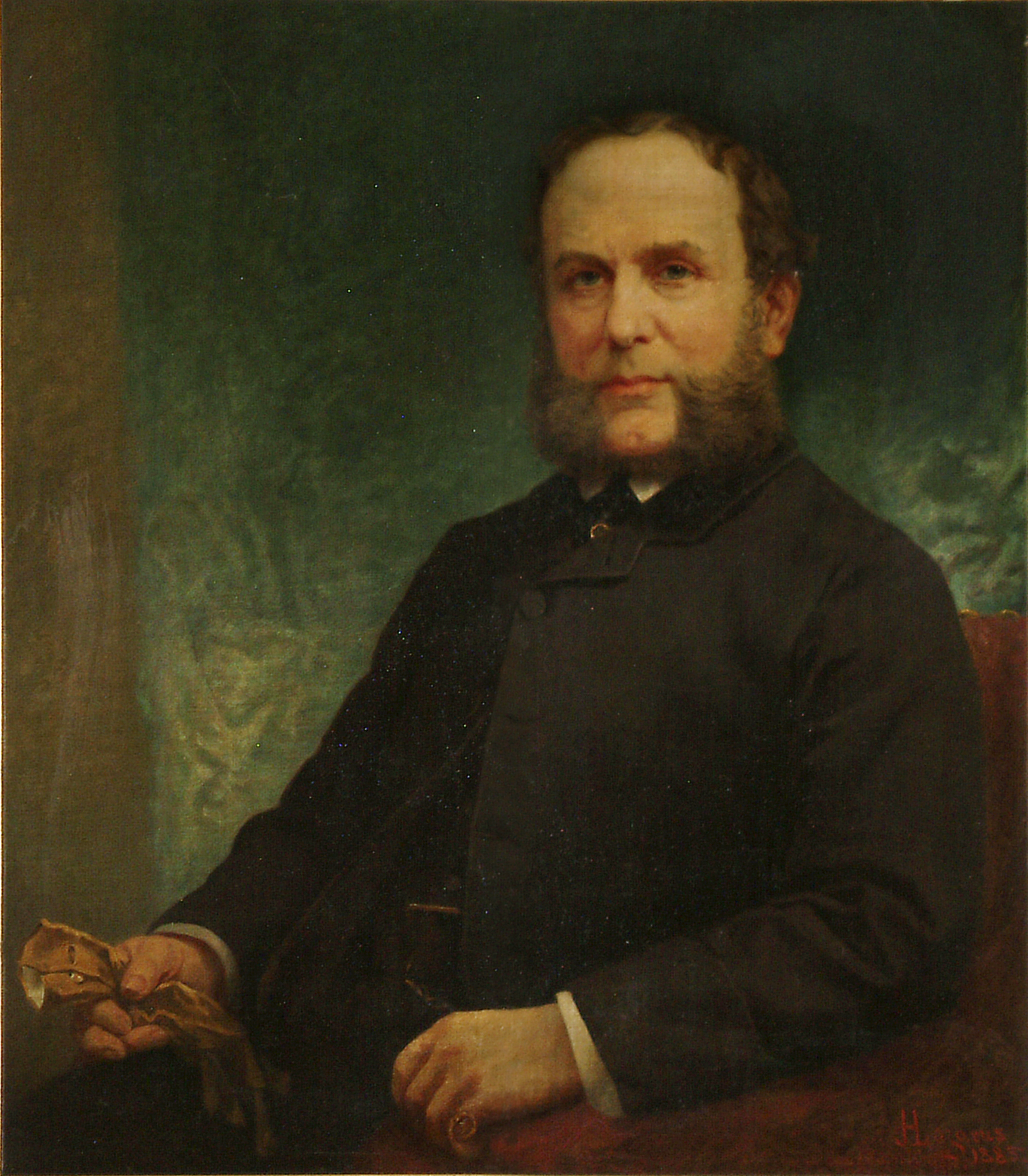
A portrait of George Macculloch Miller that is in the museum's collection.

Jacob W. Miller (1800-1862), a United States Senator, married Mary Louisa Macculloch Miller (1804-1888) in 1825. They lived in Macculloch Hall alongside her parents. Mary Louisa and Jacob had nine children in total, including Jacob William (1847-1918) and George Macculloch Miller. The residing family name became Miller after the death of George and Louisa's only son Francis in 1859. His only surviving child was a daughter, Mary (1844-1864), who came to live at the house but died a few years later.

=== 1949- present day ===
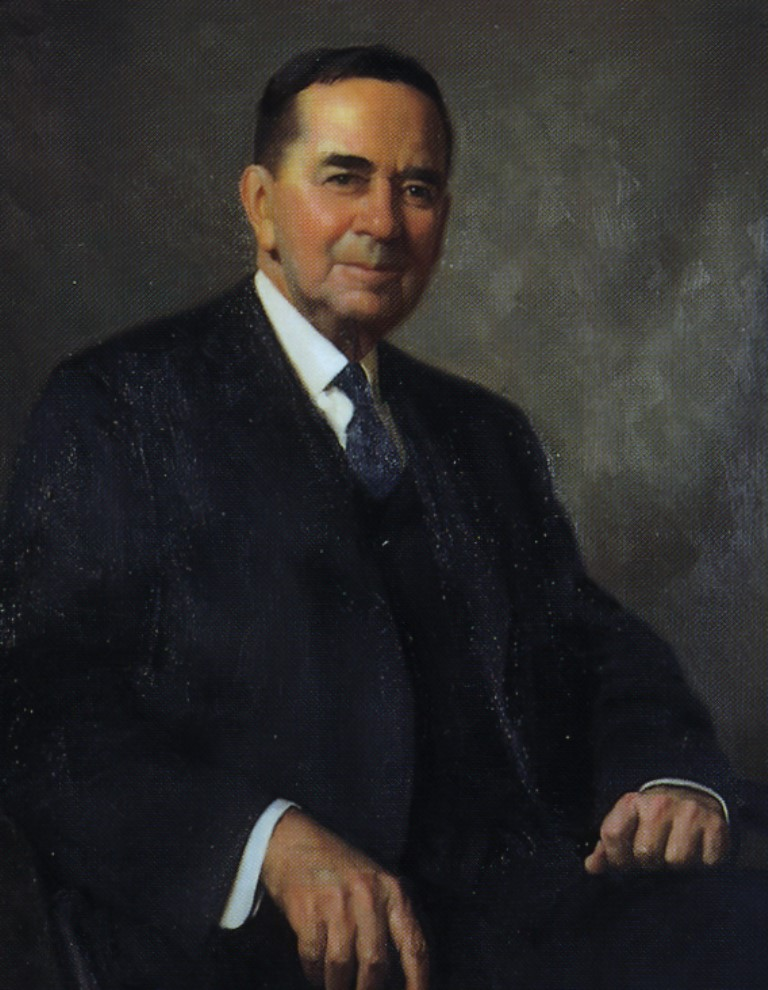
A portrait of the museum's founder W. Parsons Todd which is on display there

The house eventually passed to Dorothea Miller Post (1878-1947), known as Dolly, the daughter of Jacob William and his wife, Katherine Wise Miller (1853-1940). It was Dolly's death that prompted the family to put the house up for sale, as the family no longer resided in the mansion. Phyllis Bard McVickar Langstaff (1893-1974), the great-granddaughter of Mary Louisa and Jacob Miller, lived in the hall a short time before moving next door to another home built by the family, called the Kedge, also in the Morristown Historic District. Phyllis was a good friend of Todd and convinced him to buy it.

== Design and layout ==
=== Interior and contents ===
The mansion is four stories tall with 20 rooms. The museum aims to preserve the lives of people in the eighteenth and nineteenth centuries and features seven period rooms, two exhibition galleries, a dedicated classroom, and a expansive formal garden.

==== Thomas Nast ====
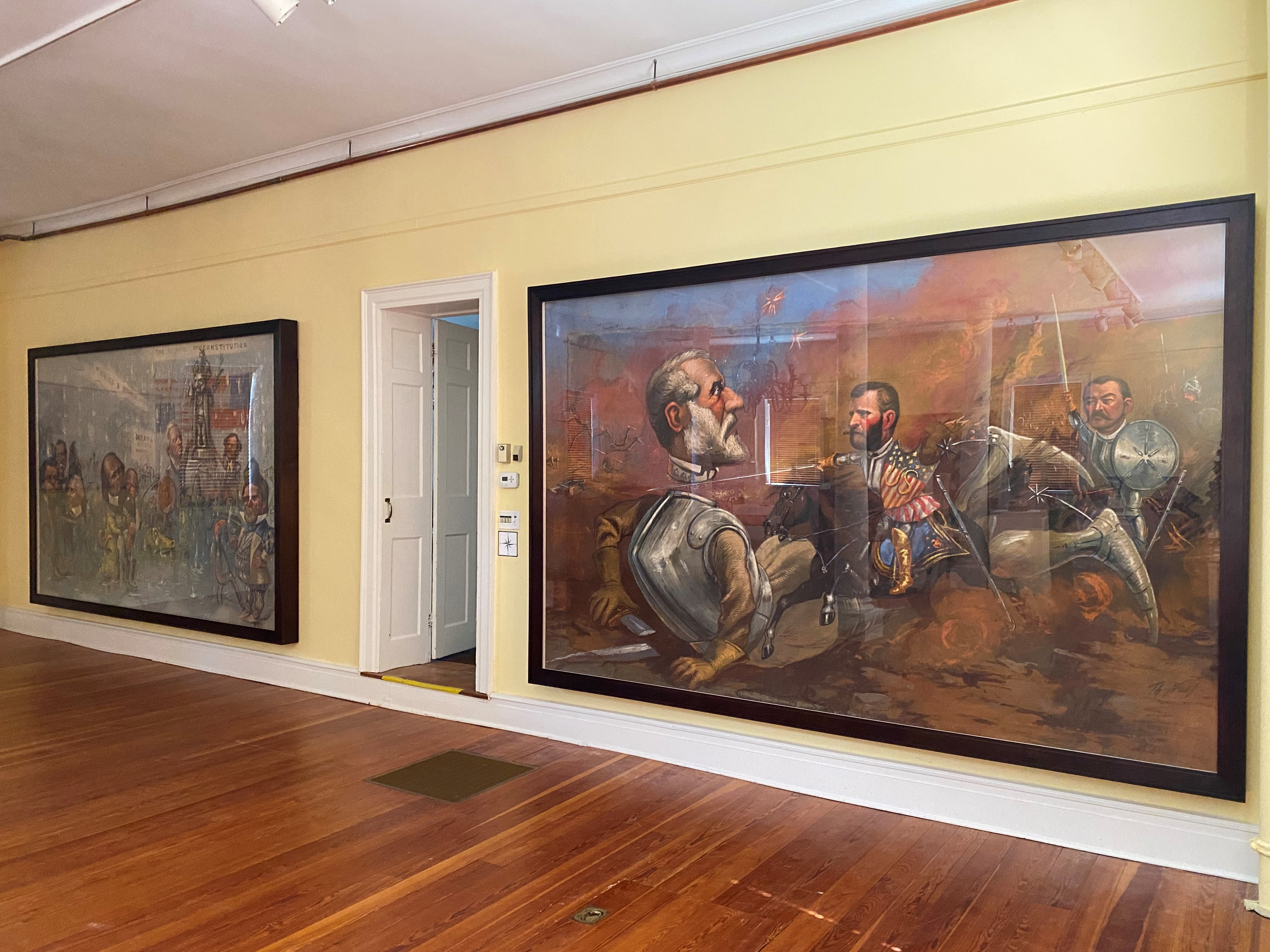
Two pieces from Thomas Nast's Caricaturama on display in the Macculloch Hall Historic Museum's gallery

The museum hosts the largest collection of Thomas Nast’s work, with both permanent and rotating exhibits dedicated to him. The permanent exhibit includes two of the murals from Nast’s The Grand Caricaturama. Nast designed The Grand Caricaturama as political theatre. From 1867-1868, the paintings were displayed on stage in New York City and Boston along with music and commentary. Macculloch Hall has two of this series in their possession. Another featuring Andrew Johnson is on display at the Morristown and Morris Township Library nearby. The other 5 surviving pieces have been stored at the Library of Congress since their last public showing in 1973.

=== Gardens and park ===
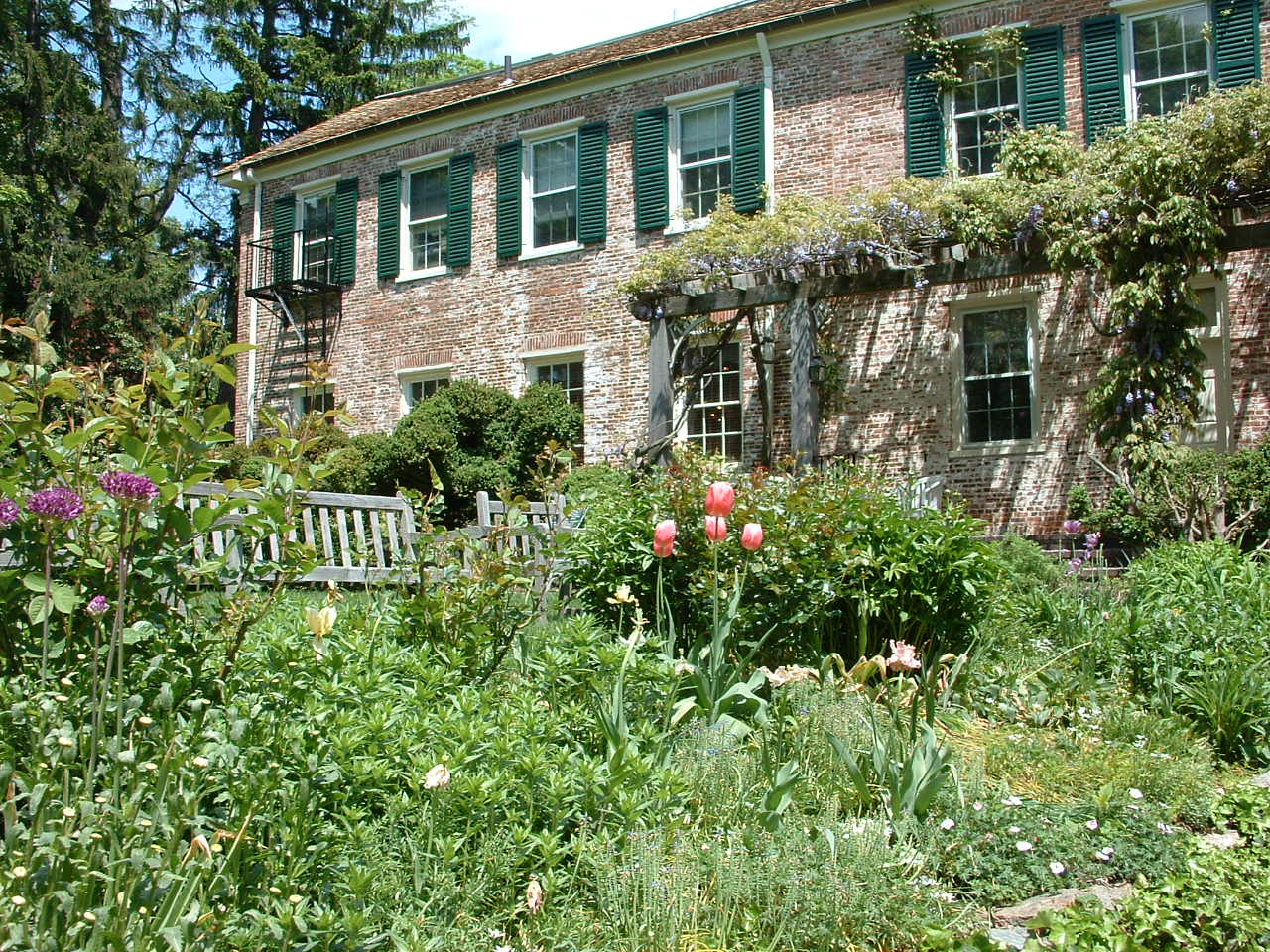
The back of the home and trellis with wisteria growing on it, gifted to the family by Matthew C. Perry and originally planted in 1857

The gardens have been in continuous cultivation for more than 200 years. The original grounds were used by the family to grow their own food, including apple and pear orchards. George was a dedicated gardener and kept meticulous journals about the garden and what he planted, which the museum is still in possession of. He recorded the planting of tomatoes on May 12, 1829: the first record of tomatoes in New Jersey, although the variety that George planted is unknown. The museum garden continues to grow tomatoes to this day.

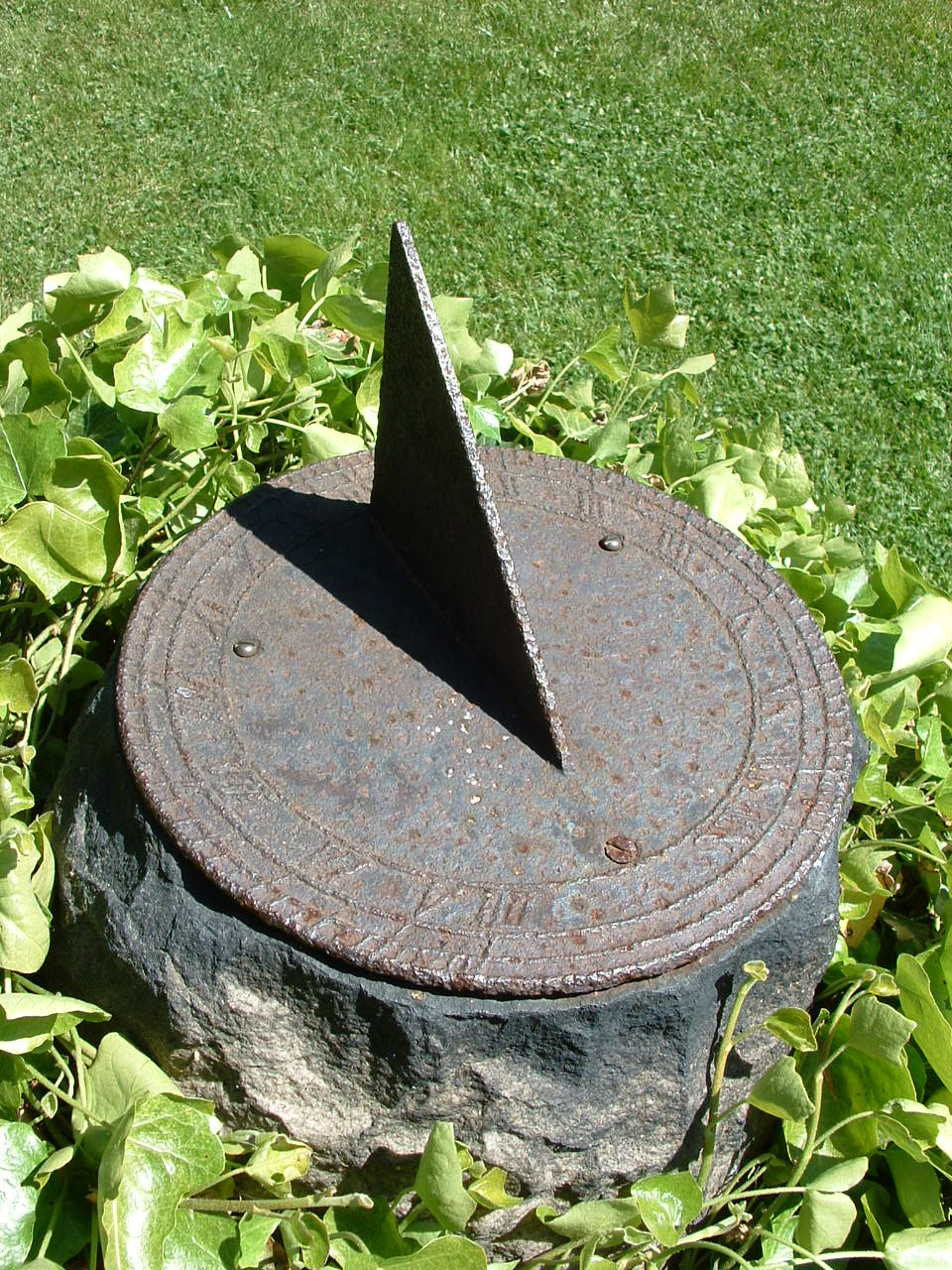
A sundial from 1876 on display in the public garden

In the 1950s the Garden Club of Morristown was directed by Todd to replant the garden which remains in use today. The garden contains several historical features including the wisteria trellised along the rear porch which was given to the family in 1857 by Commodore Matthew Perry, a sundial that was installed in 1876 and is still on display, and a sassafras tree that is believed to be the second oldest and largest one in New Jersey. The gardens are free and open daily for visitors.

== Accessibility and education ==
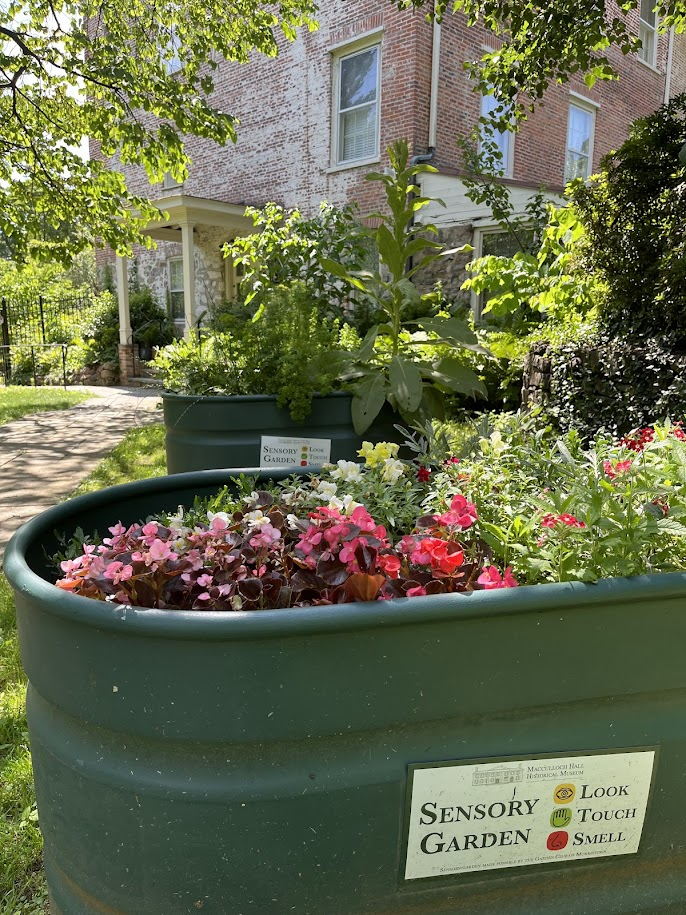
The sensory garden in the gardens

The museum has a range of youth education programs, including a free classroom program Growing Good Health, for preschoolers that started in 2017. The program teaches the importance of nature and healthy eating through art, science, and history. It also works with senior citizens to deliver art boxes to allow homebound seniors to engage with New Jersey history and American art.

A grant through the Institute of Museum and Library Services to increase accessibility through multisensory engagement was used to implement a range of audio and tactile accommodations to the museum. These include an Accessible Audio guide, an audio guide with braille wayfinding sign and the Please Touch Tour, a tactile tour of the building and collections for low-vision visitors.

== Gallery ==
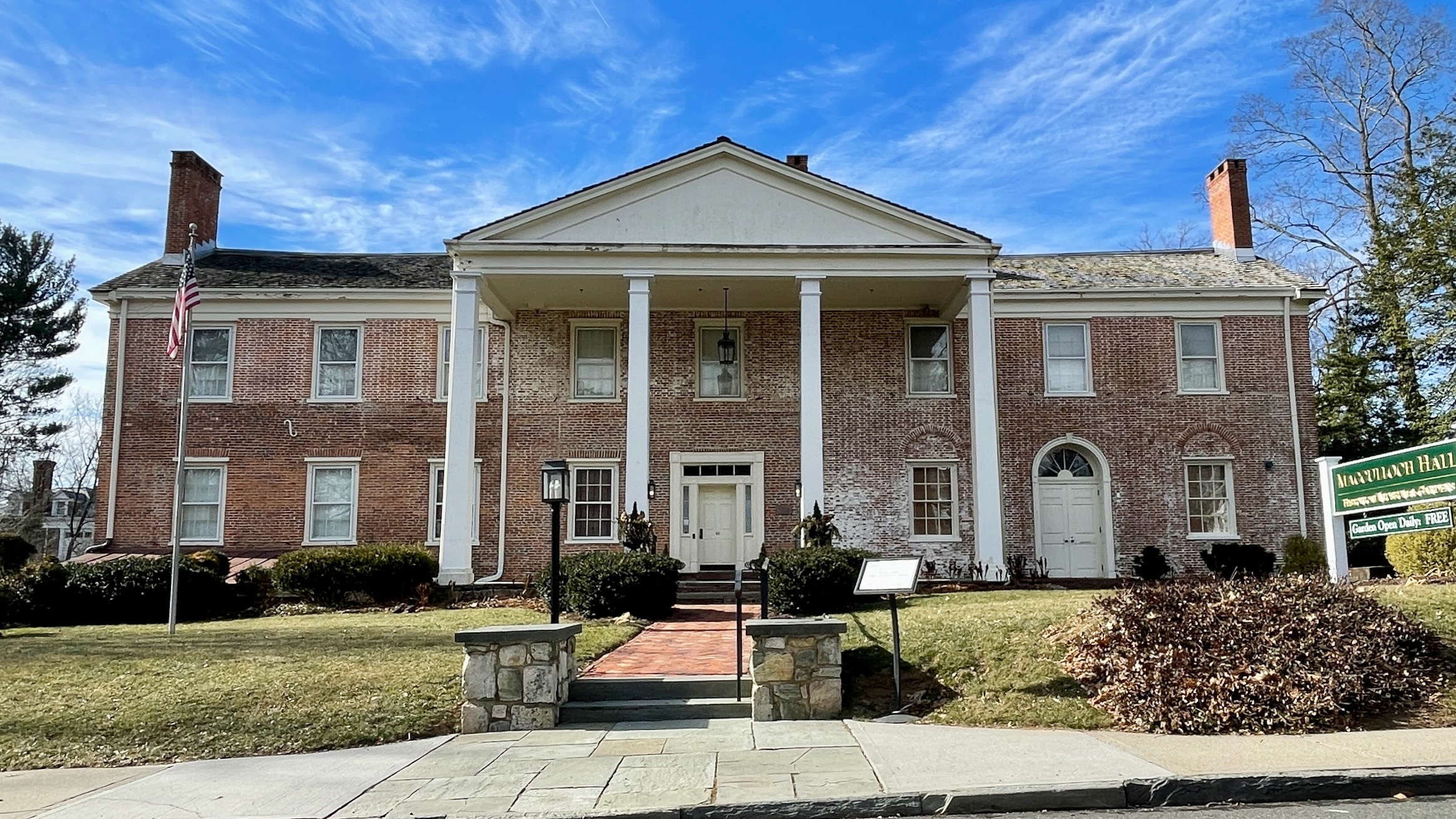

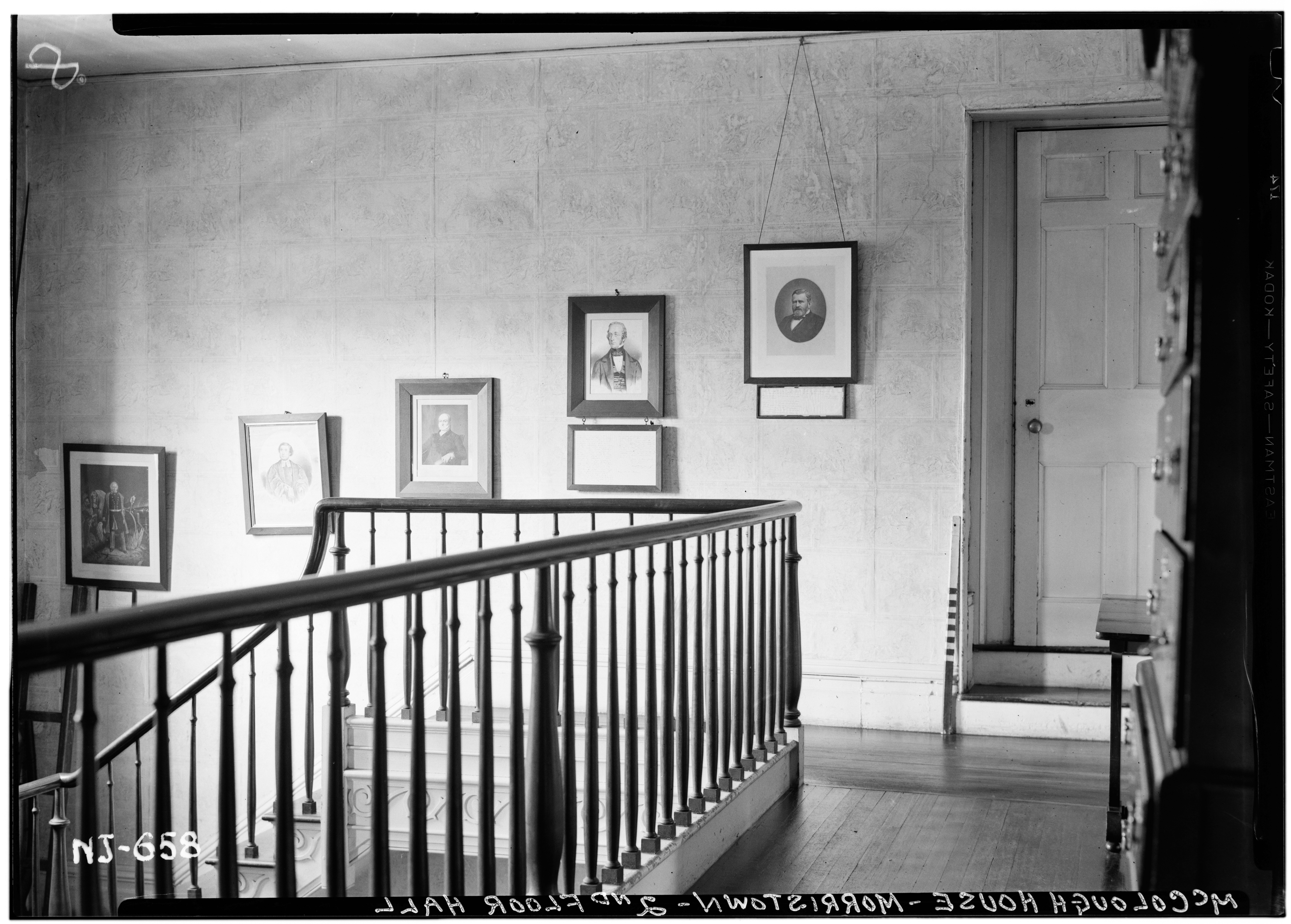

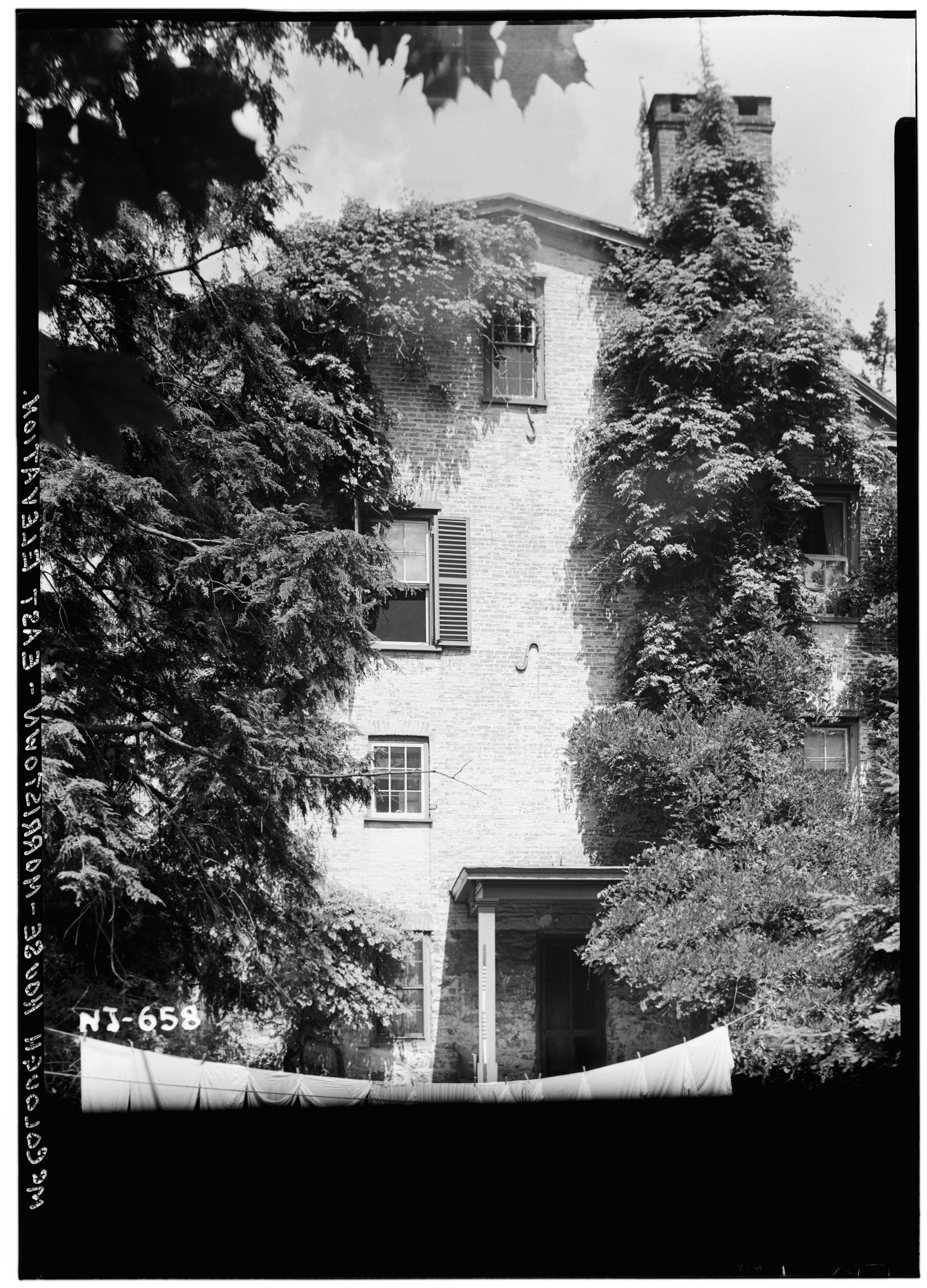

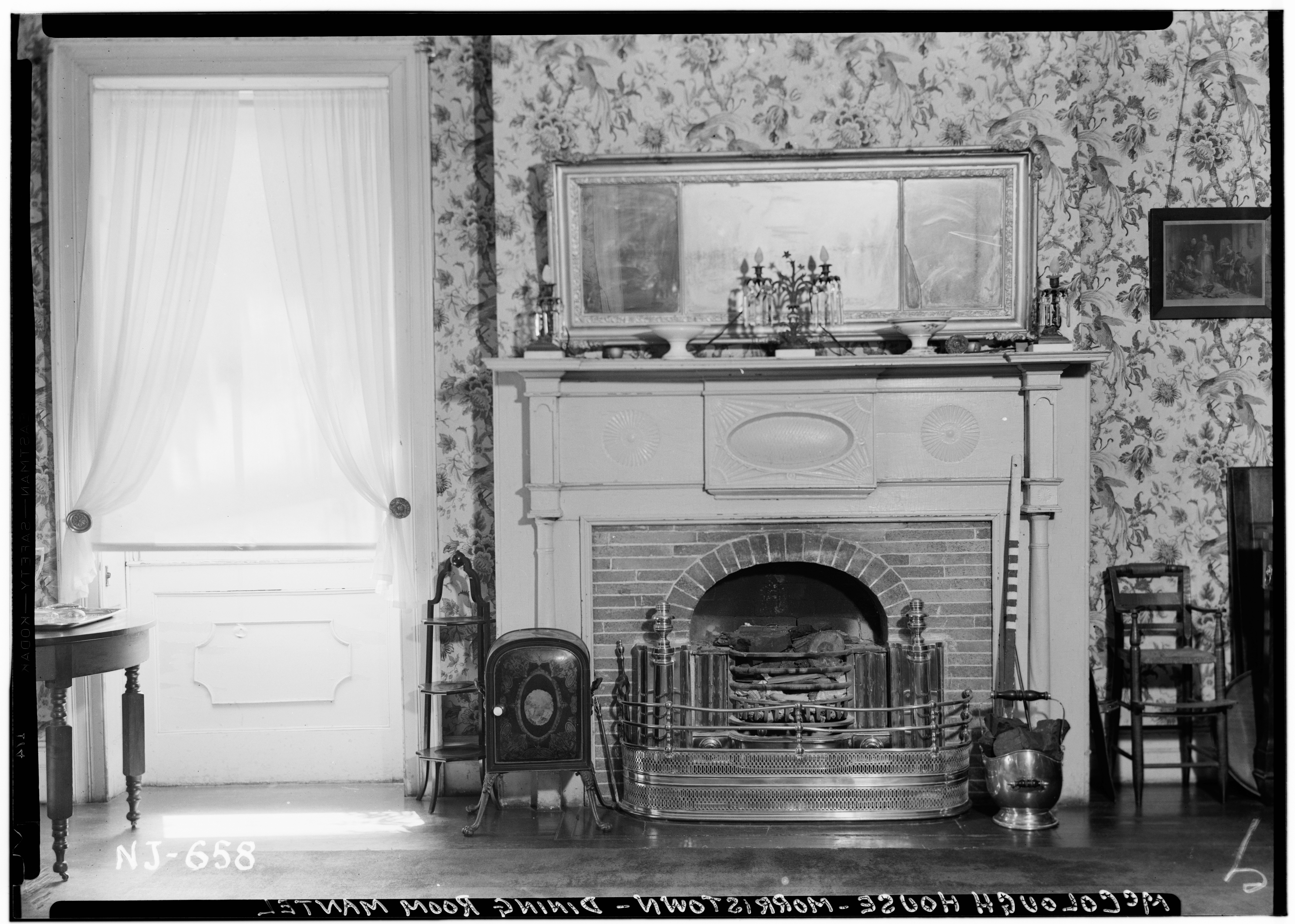

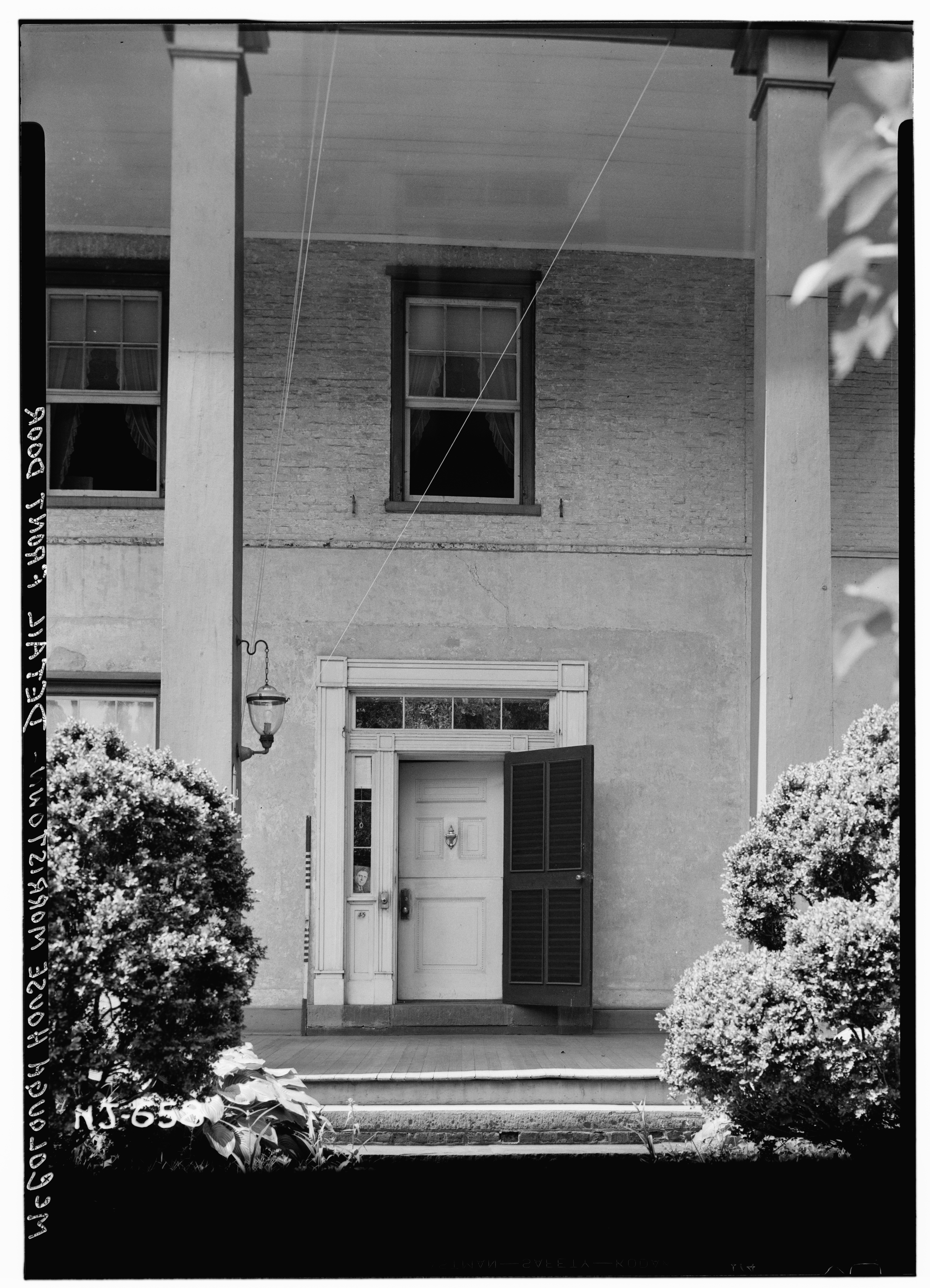

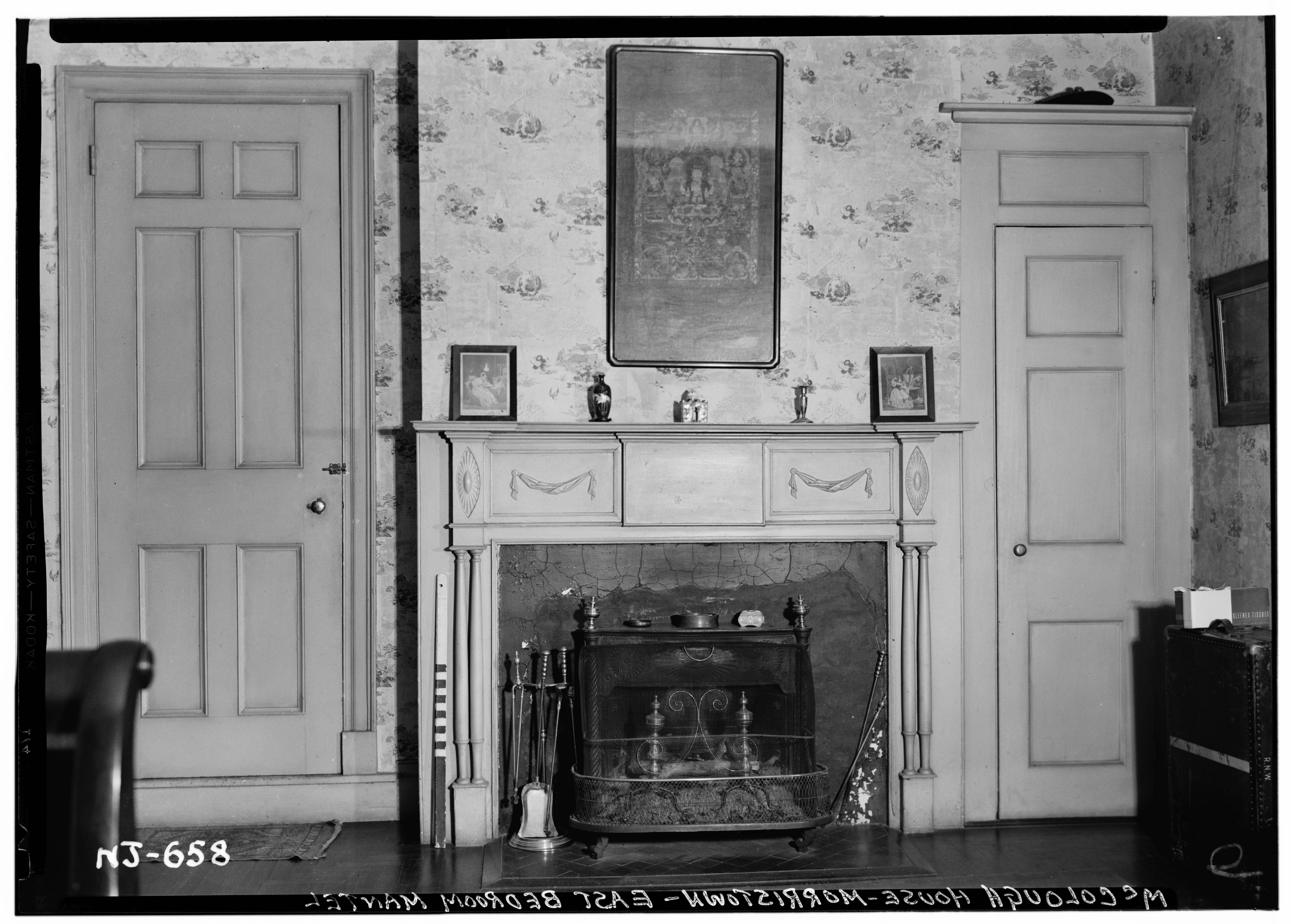

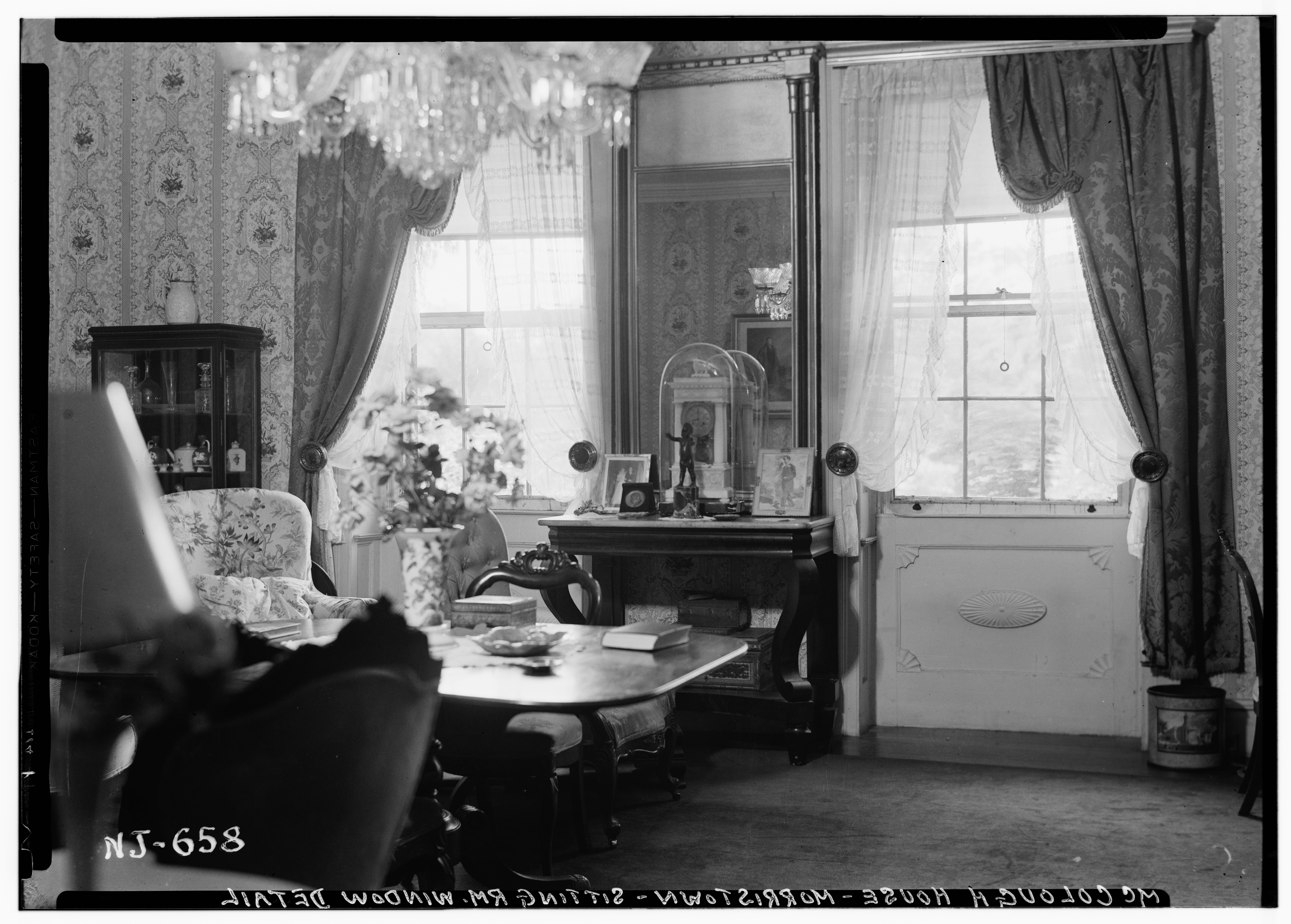

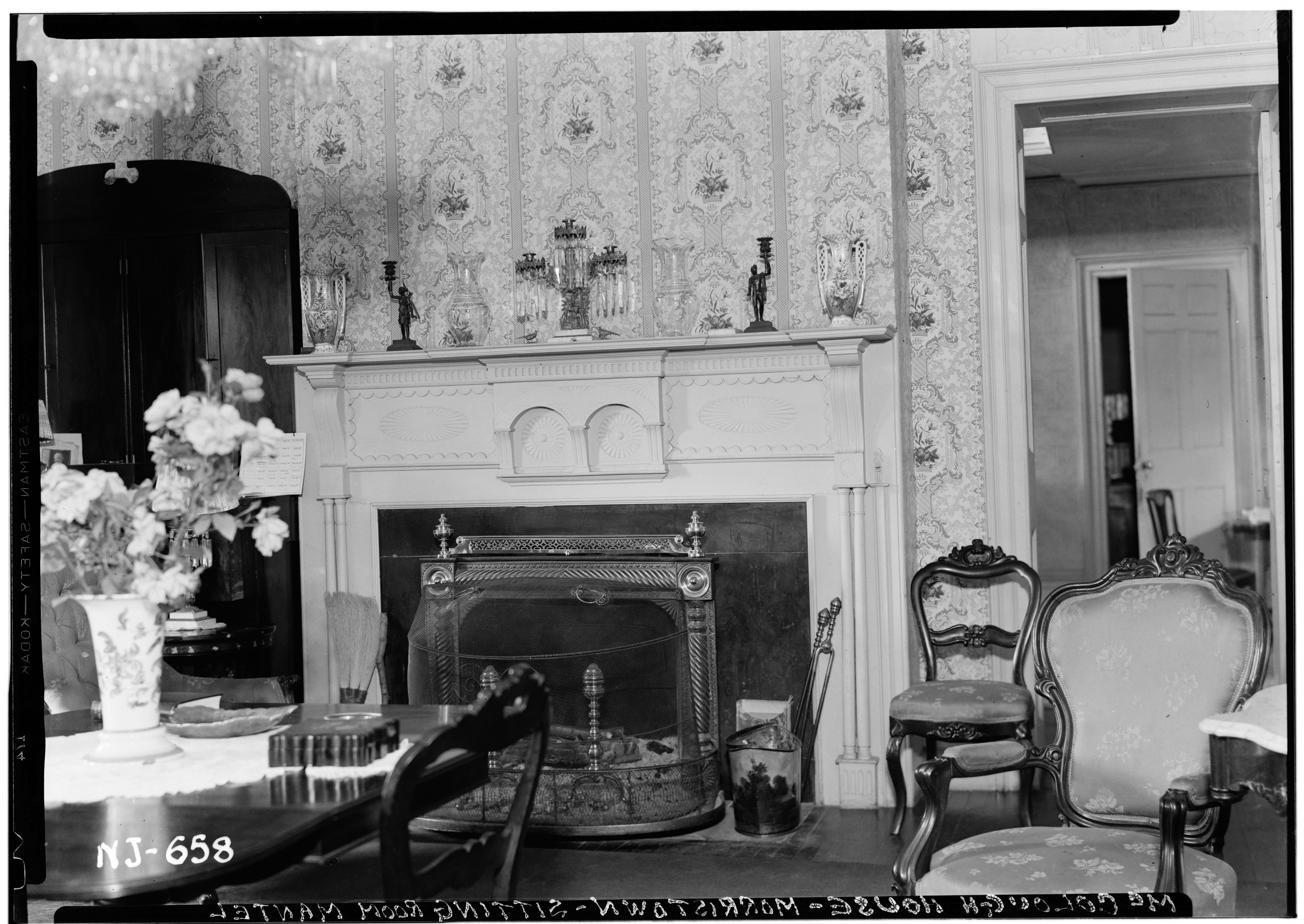

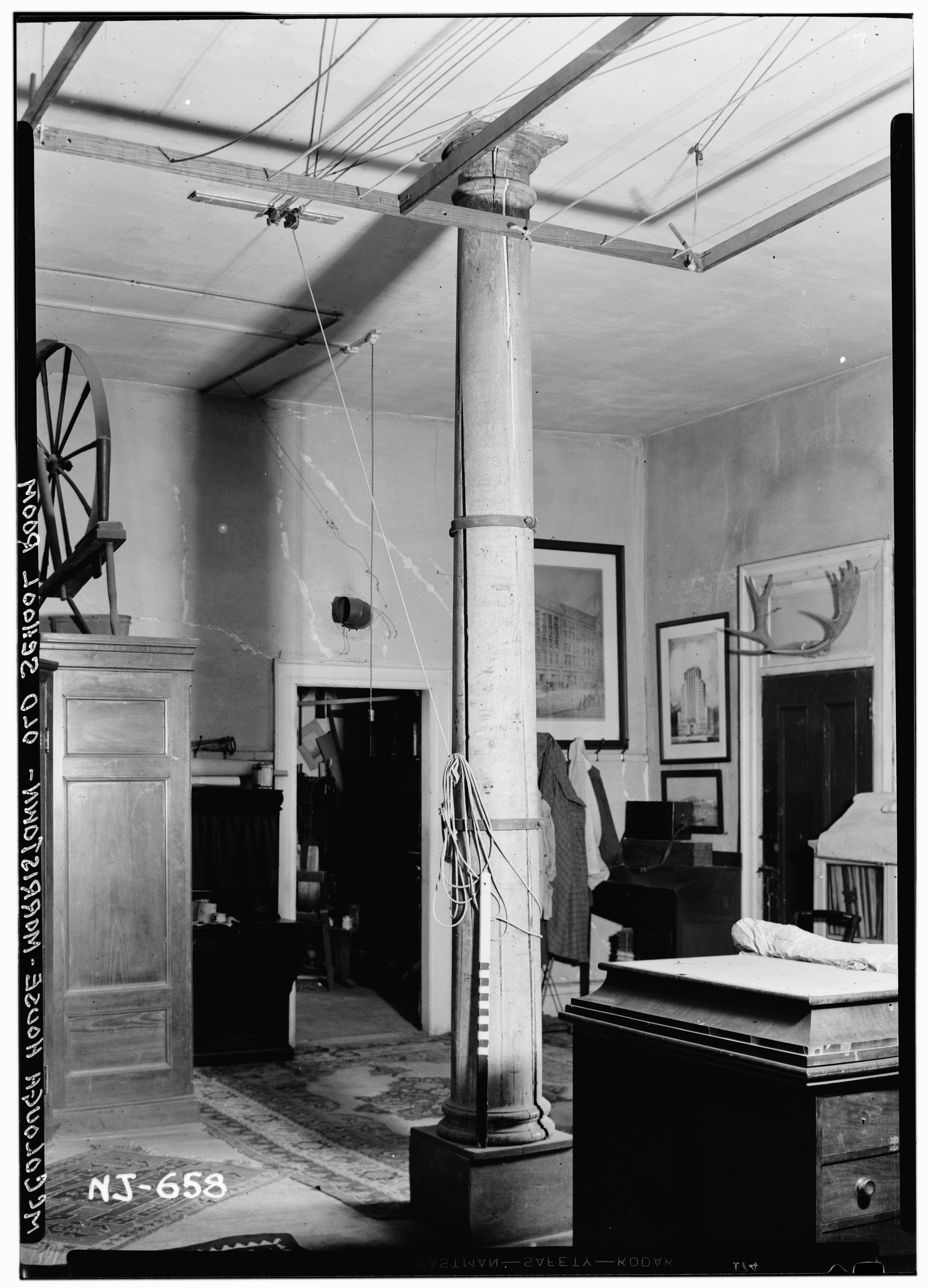

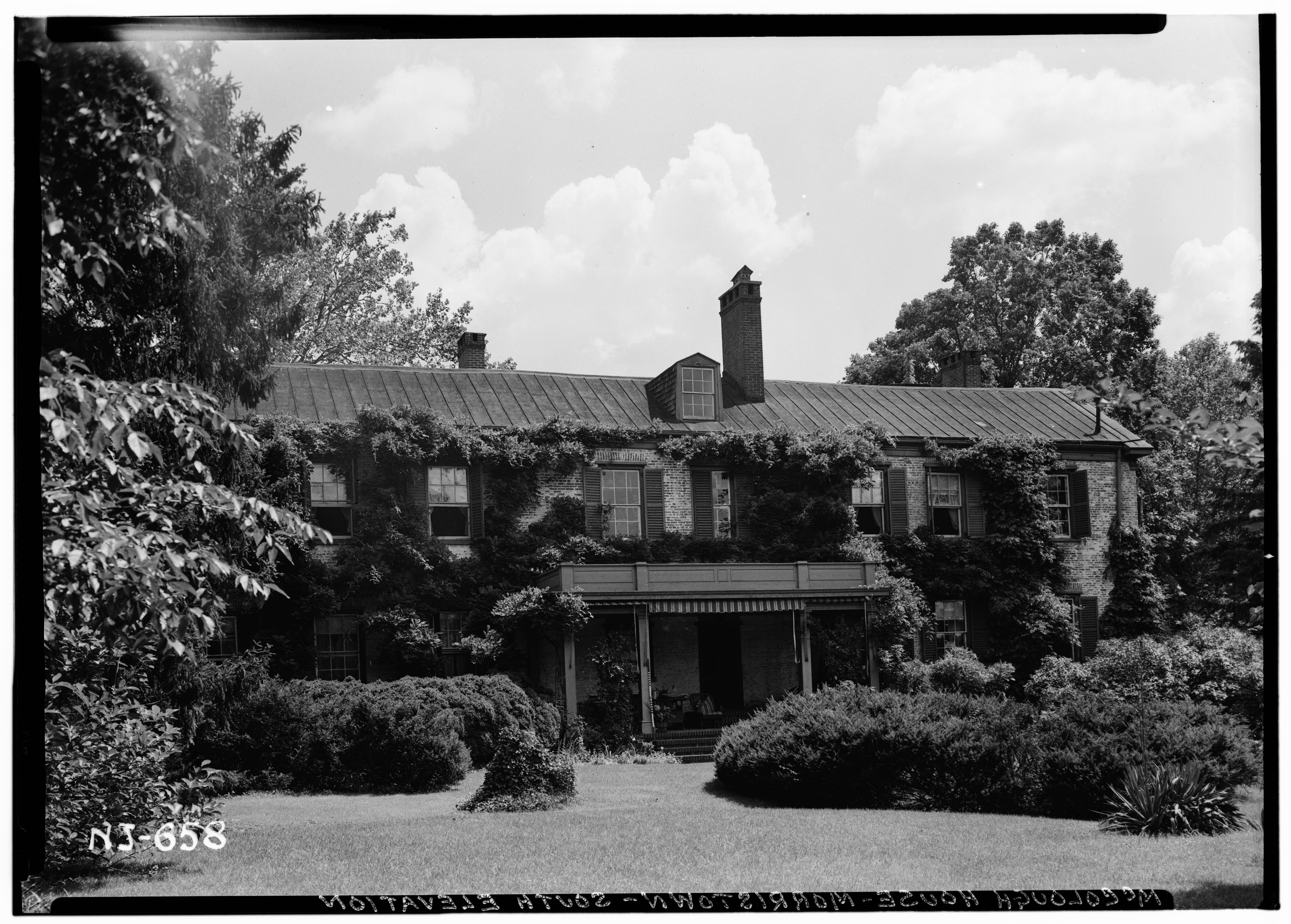
