= Psammodromus blanci =

Blanc's sand racer

Conservation status
- Least Concern (IUCN 3.1)

Scientific classification
- Kingdom: Animalia
- Phylum: Chordata
- Class: Reptilia
- Order: Squamata
- Family: Lacertidae
- Genus: Psammodromus
- Species: P. blanci

Binomial name
- Psammodromus blanci (Lataste, 1880)
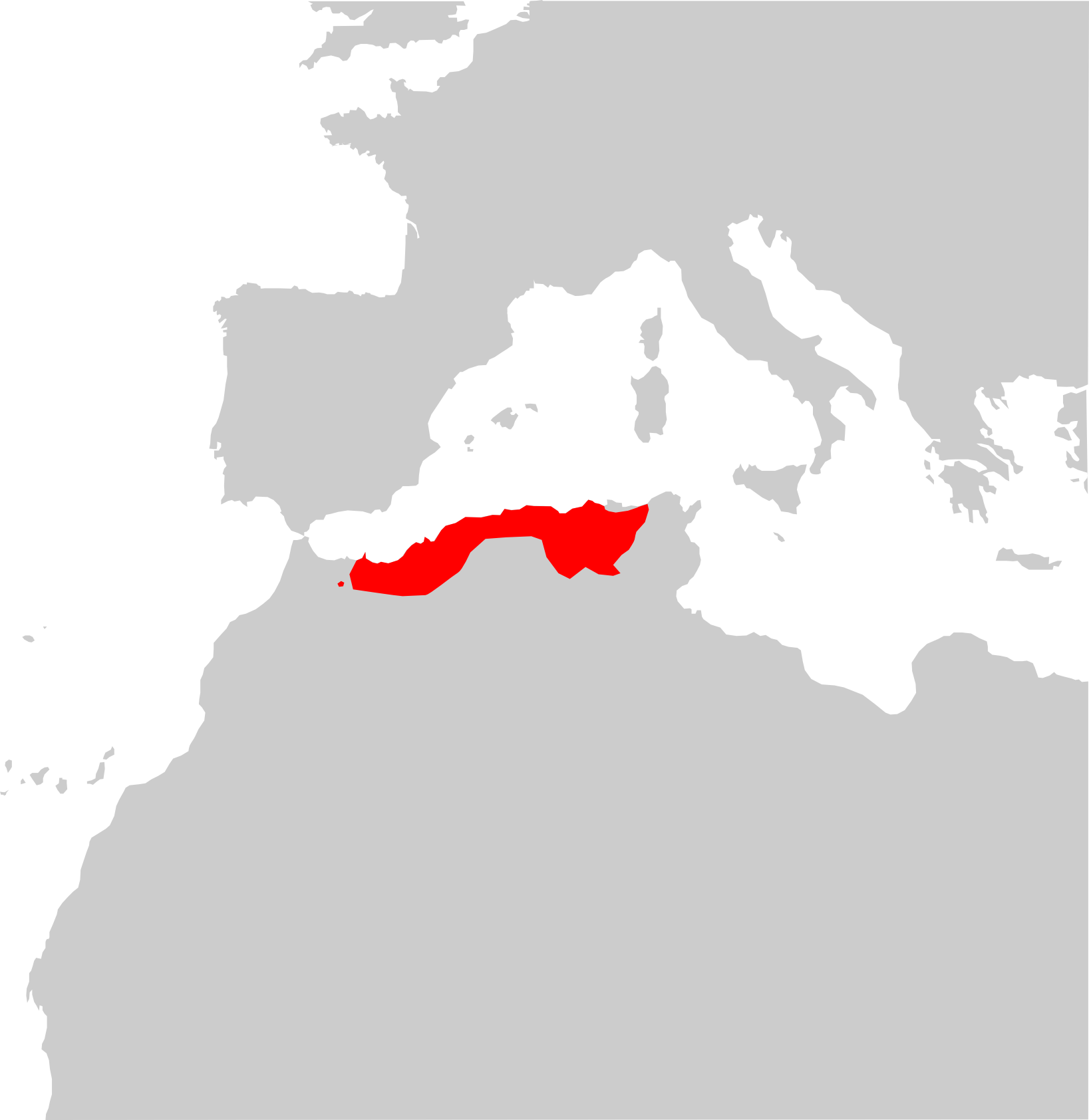

Synonyms
- Zerzoumia blanci Lataste, 1880; Psammodromus blanci — Boulenger, 1887

Species of lizard

Psammodromus blanci, also known commonly as Blanc's sand racer or Blanc's psammodromus, is a species of lizard in the family Lacertidae. The species is endemic to North Africa.

== Etymology ==
It has been claimed that the specific name, blanci, and the common name, Blanc's sand racer, are in honor of Swiss zoologist Henri Blanc, however it is in fact named after its Algerian discoverer Marius Blanc.

== Geographic range ==
P. blanci is found in Algeria, Morocco, and Tunisia.

== Habitat ==
The natural habitats of Blanc's sand racer are temperate forest, temperate shrubland, and pastureland, at altitudes of 1,000–1,200 m (3,300–3,900 ft).

== Reproduction ==
P. blanci is oviparous. A sexually mature female may lay four or five clutches a year. Each clutch contains two to five eggs.

== Conservation status ==
P. blanci is threatened by habitat loss.
