= Adolphe-Edmond Blanc =

French politician and lawyer

- Born: 4 October 1799; Paris, France
- Died: 4 April 1850 (aged 50); Paris, France
- Occupations: Lawyer, politician

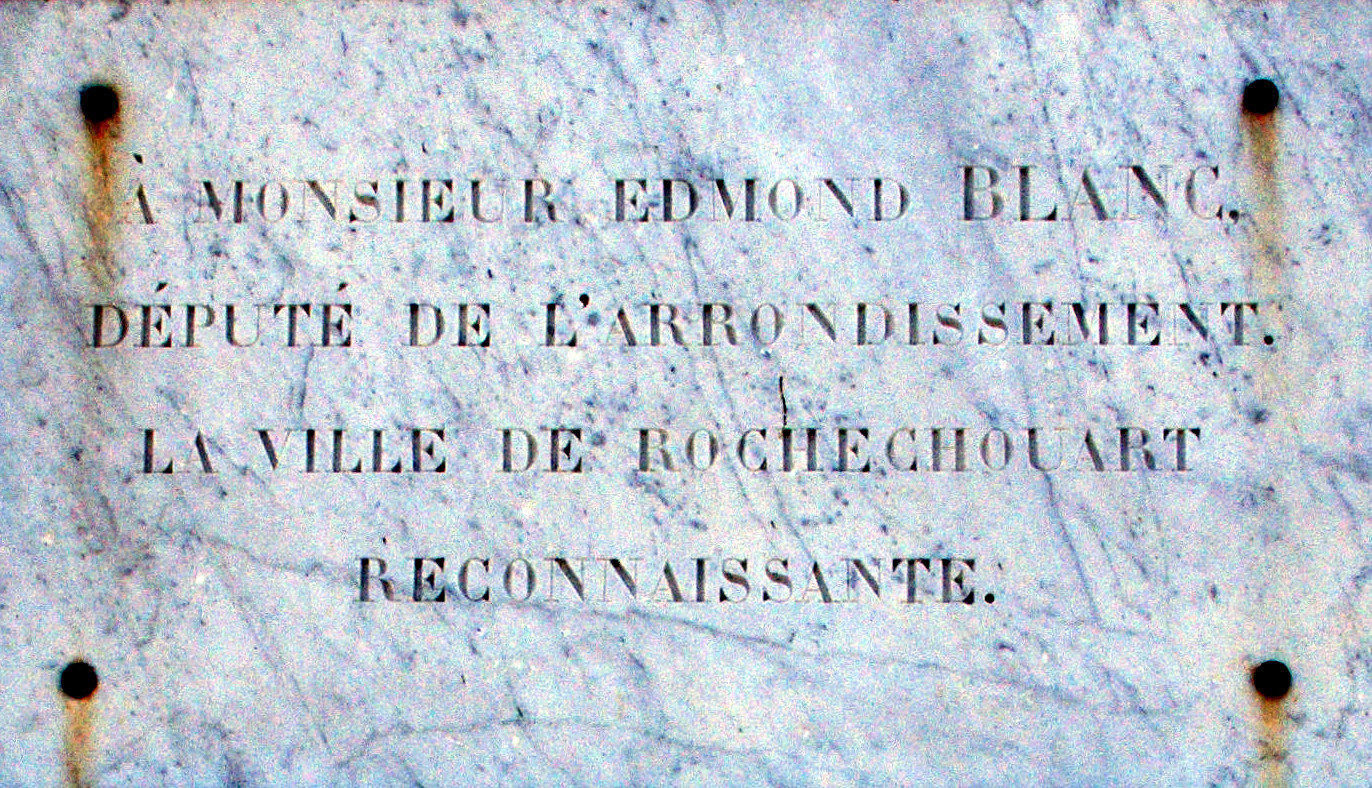
Commemorative plaque in Rochechouart, Haute-Vienne, France.

Adolphe-Edmond Blanc (1799–1850) was a French lawyer and politician. He served in the Chamber of Deputies from 1832 to 1837, and from 1842 to 1848, representing Haute-Vienne. He was conservative.
