= Henri Blanc (zoologist) =

Swiss zoologist (1859–1930)

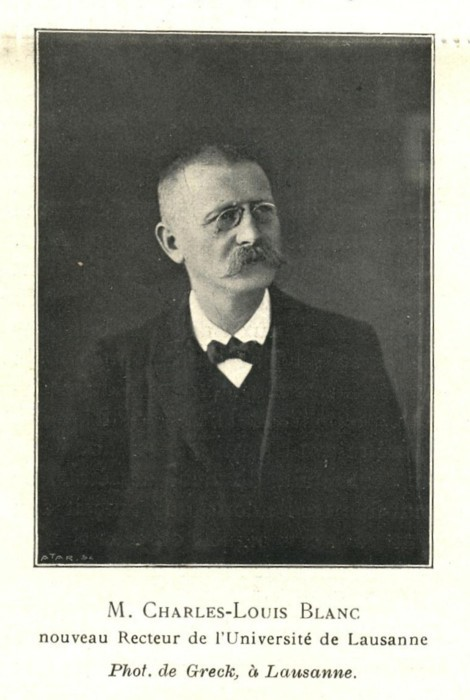
- Blanc c. 1908
- Born: Henri-Charles-Louis Blanc; 15 September 1859; Lausanne, Switzerland
- Died: 10 May 1930 (aged 70)
- Education: University of Lausanne; Freiburg im Breisgau
- Occupation: Zoologist
- Scientific career
- Fields: Zoology

Henri-Charles-Louis Blanc (15 September 1859 – 10 May 1930) was a Swiss zoologist at the University of Lausanne. He took an interest in aquatic animals, describing numerous species from Lake Geneva. He was also curator of the natural history museum in Lausanne.

Blanc was born in Lausanne to Charles Francois and Jeanne Susanne née Rey. He received a degree in science from the University of Lausanne before going to Freiburg im Breisgau where he received a doctorate in 1880. He then worked at museums in Kiel and Berlin with Karl Möbius and returned to Lausanne in 1883 as a lecturer in histology at the medicine faculty. He became a full professor in 1891, while also becoming curator of the zoology museum (following the death of Jean-Jacques Larguier des Bancels) which he reorganized in 1909 at the Palais de Rumine. He was a founder of the Swiss Naturalists Society. He examined the fauna of Lake Geneva along with F. A. Forel and took a special interest in the freshwater foraminifera. He wrote textbooks on comparative anatomy. He retired in 1929.

It has been claimed that Psammodromus blanci was named in his honour but that species was named after its discoverer, a Marius Blanc.
