= Georges Blanc (pilot) =

Georges Pierre Blanc
- Born: 18 June 1887; Charente, France
- Died: 25 April 1960 (aged 72)
- Military career
- Allegiance: France
- Branch: Infantry, then flying service
- Service years: 1908–1918
- Rank: Adjutant
- Unit: N62, Spa154, N31
- Awards: Légion d'honneur, Médaille militaire, Croix de Guerre

Adjutant Georges Pierre Blanc was a World War I flying ace credited with five aerial victories.

== Biography ==
Called for military service on 10 October 1908, Blanc was posted to an infantry regiment. On 20 June 1915, he began pilot's training, receiving Military Pilot's Brevet No. 2232 on 31 December. After some intermediary postings, he arrived at Escadrille N31 on 31 March 1917. He would score five aerial victories with this squadron, and be promoted to Adjutant.
