= Gabriel Ford =

Soldier in the American Revolutionary War

Gabriel Ford (January 3, 1765 – August 27, 1849) was a soldier, lawyer, and jurist from Morristown, New Jersey. He served in the Continental Army during the American Revolutionary War, and his home served as George Washington's headquarters during part of his time in New Jersey.

He ran a prominent law practice. After the war, he was appointed judge on the United States District Court.
