= Morristown and Morris Township Library =

New Jersey public library

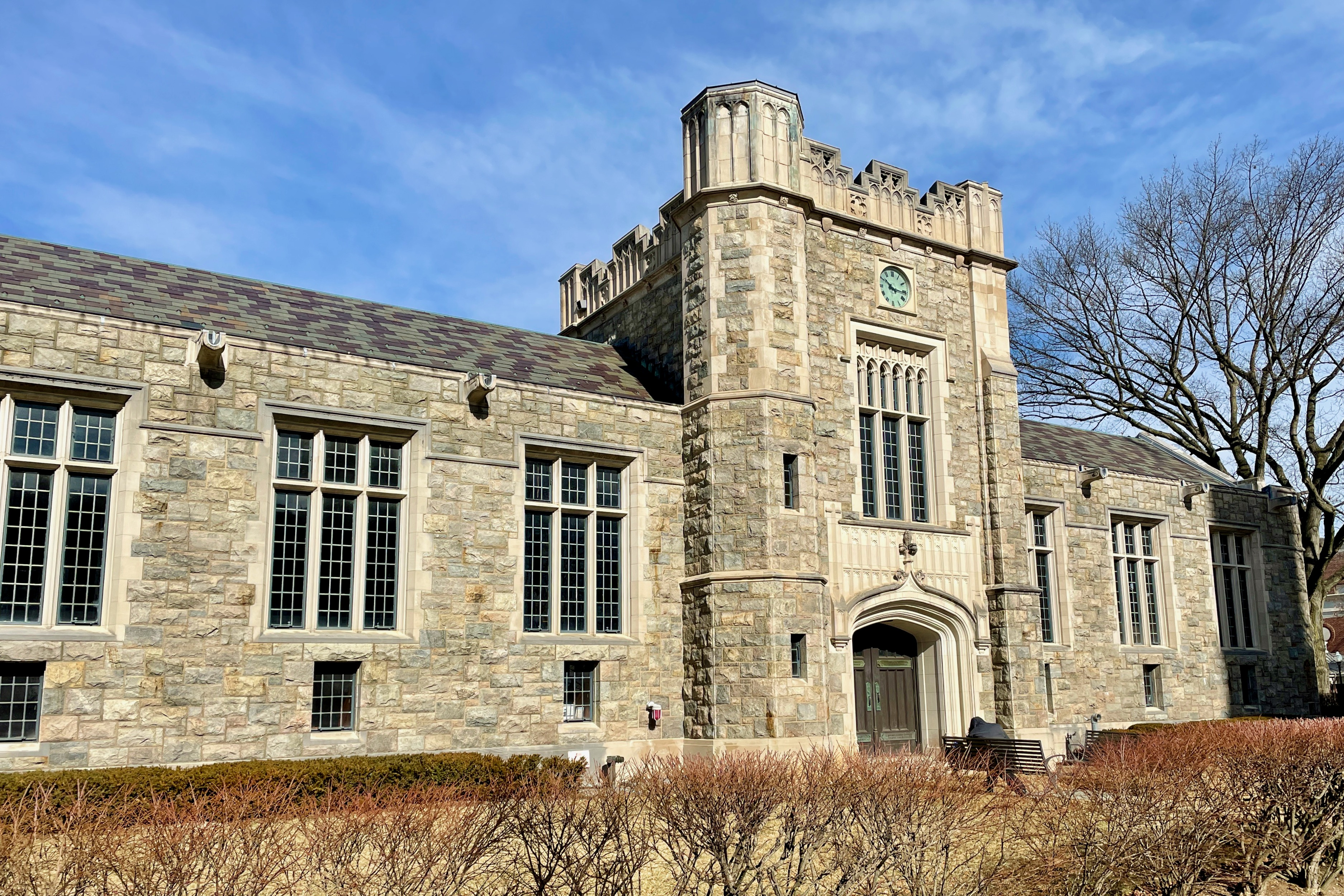
- The Morristown and Morris Township Library, pictured in 2022
- 40°47′37″N 74°28′43″W
- Location: 1 Miller Road, Morristown, New Jersey, 07960

Other information
- Website: Official website

The Morristown and Morris Township Library is a joint free public library for the towns of Morristown and Morris Township, New Jersey, United States.

== History ==
In 1792, informal book trading occurred among Morristown residents, with 97 members and 96 books.

In 1812, residents formed the Morristown Library Association to grow the effort. This was officially incorporated in 1866 as the Morristown Library and Lyceum organization.

In 1875, the library moved to South Street, between Park Place and Pine Street. By that time, at least 8,000 volumes were available to borrow.

After growing to 30,000 volumes, a 1914 fire destroyed the lyceum and much of its contents. The library was temporarily housed in the old YMCA building on South Street. Meanwhile, the trustees used insurance and savings to buy land at the corner of Miller Road and South Street, with the intention of erecting a new library building.

In 1916, retired textile merchant Grinnell Willis paid the entire cost of a new, fireproof building. He did so in "grateful remembrance of the love and affection bestowed on his late wife by her friends and neighbors in Morristown."

On December 13, 1917, following Willis's donation, the library opened to the public, with 8,000 volumes and four staff members.

Its Modern Mondays Reading Club, an exclusive women's-only book club established in 1921, included prominent community members such as anthropologist Ethel Cutler Freeman; writer Dorothy Kunhardt; local farmer Caroline Rose Foster; and Elinor Parker, manager of Scribner's Book Store.

In 1965, the Morristown & Morris Township Library began to serve as a Joint Free Public Library.

The Dowling Wing was completed in 1987. This created a new front entrance on South Street and a magazine room. Part of the wing is the Children's Room and the Treasure Room. In 2006 it was enlarged to create the Anne and Kenneth Croy Media Center, which moved the Children's Room to the second floor. The first floor kept the Reading Room, and added the North Jersey History and Genealogy Center. Their Library of things was able to grow with a grant from the John Bickford Foundation.

In 1991, a federal district court in Newark ruled that the library's policies on homelessness were overbroad and vague, violated of the First amendment, and violated the due process of Richard Kreimer, a homeless man who had been kicked out for annoying patrons with an allegedly offensive odor. In 1992, a federal appeals court in Philadelphia reversed the decision, but the library's insurance company had already paid the man $80,000. Kreimer also won a settlement for $150,000 after suing the Morristown Police Department for harassment.

== Notable items on display ==
The large golden eagle in the reference room is the only surviving item from the Morristown Armory, which was destroyed in a 1920 fire.

Blacksmith Samuel Yellin contributed two works to the museum. In 1931, he designed a custom fire screen incorporating the letters 'M' (for Morristown) and 'W' (for contributor Grinnell Willis). He also constructed the guard rail in the room's balcony; its 25 brass panels name World War I soldiers from Morristown and Morris Township.

Thomas Nast's 1867 caricature painting, Swinging Round the Circle, is displayed in the media center. Created for Nast's The Grand Caricaturama tour, each painting in the series was shown onstage in New York City and Boston accompanied by live entertainment, music, and commentary. It measures 7 by 11 feet and features President Andrew Johnson and his administration officials riding a rudimentary carousel.
