= List of colleges and universities in Connecticut =

The following is a list of colleges and universities in the U.S. state of Connecticut. This list includes all schools that grant degrees at an associates level or higher, and are either accredited or in the process of accreditation by a recognized accrediting agency.

The state's flagship public university is the multi-campus University of Connecticut, which is also the largest higher education institution in the state, including UConn Health. The remainder of the state's public institutions constitute the Connecticut State Colleges & Universities, comprising four state universities, twelve community colleges, and an online school, Charter Oak State College. Connecticut is also the home of one of the five federally-run service academies, the United States Coast Guard Academy.

The oldest college in the state, founded in 1701, is Yale University.

== Institutions ==
School	Location	Control	Carnegie Classification	Enrollment (Fall 2024)	Founded
Albertus Magnus College	New Haven	Private (Catholic)	Masters university	1,239	1925
Central Connecticut State University	New Britain	Public	Masters university	9,997	1849
Charter Oak State College	New Britain	Public	Baccalaureate college	2,012	1973
Connecticut College	New London	Private	Baccalaureate college	1,990	1911
Connecticut State Community College	Various	Public	Associates college	36,315	2023
Eastern Connecticut State University	Willimantic	Public	Masters university	4,355	1889
Fairfield University	Fairfield	Private (Catholic)	Masters university	6,864	1942
Goodwin University	East Hartford	Private	Baccalaureate/associate's college	2,970	1962
Hartford International University for Religion and Peace	Hartford	Private	Masters university	109	1833
Holy Apostles College and Seminary	Cromwell	Private (Catholic)	Masters university	719	1956
Mitchell College	New London	Private	Baccalaureate college	442	1938
Post University	Waterbury	Private (for-profit)	Masters university	16,178	1890
Quinnipiac University	Hamden	Private	Doctoral university	9,424	1929
Sacred Heart University	Fairfield	Private (Catholic)	Doctoral university	11,022	1963
Southern Connecticut State University	New Haven	Public	Masters university	9,377	1893
Trinity College	Hartford	Private	Baccalaureate college	2,238	1823
United States Coast Guard Academy	New London	Public (federal)	Baccalaureate college	1,108	1876
University of Bridgeport	Bridgeport	Private	Doctoral university	3,838	1927
University of Connecticut	Storrs	Public	Doctoral university	33,554	1881
University of Hartford	West Hartford	Private	Doctoral university	6,015	1877
University of New Haven	West Haven	Private	Masters university	9,229	1920
University of Saint Joseph	West Hartford	Private (Catholic)	Masters university	1,952	1932
Wesleyan University	Middletown	Private	Baccalaureate college	4,011	1831
Western Connecticut State University	Danbury	Public	Masters university	4,169	1903
Yale University	New Haven	Private	Doctoral university	15,564	1701

== Unaccredited institutions ==
Institutions can be authorized by the Connecticut Office of Higher Education to offer academic degrees, but may not be currently accredited by a recognized accrediting body:

- Legion of Christ College of Humanities in Cheshire
- International Institute for Astronautical Sciences in Groton
- Arizona College of Nursing in Hartford, Connecticut
- Lincoln Technical Institute in New Britain, Connecticut
- St. Thomas Seminary in Bloomfield, Connecticut
- The Norwalk Conservatory of the Arts in Norwalk. Connecticut

== Out-of-state institutions ==
Several institutions based in other states offer, or have offered, degree programs at sites in Connecticut, under license from the state:

- The Robert Larner College of Medicine of the University of Vermont has a branch at the Western Connecticut Health Network facilities in Danbury and Norwalk.
- Relay Graduate School of Education has a branch in New Haven, Connecticut

== Defunct institutions ==
Connecticut once had five State Technical Colleges, separate from the system of 12 Community Colleges, before consolidation of the systems. For example, Three Rivers Community College (Connecticut) was formed from Mohegan Community College and Thames Valley State Technical College in the 1990s. Several private schools that once operated in the state have closed, discontinued their degree programs, or moved to other states:

School	Location	Control	Type	Founded	Closed	Ref.
Annhurst College	South Woodstock	Private (Catholic)	Liberal arts college	1941	1980	
Bais Binyomin Academy	Stamford	Private (Orthodox Jewish)	Talmudic school	1976	2016	
Bridgeport Hospital School of Nursing	Bridgeport		Nursing School		2017	
Lincoln College of New England	Southington	Private (for-profit)	Baccalaureate/associate's college	1966	2018	
Litchfield Law School	Litchfield	Private	Law school	1773	1833	
Longview College	Enfield	Private (Catholic)	Sisters' college	1944	1972	
Mount Sacred Heart College	Hamden	Private (Catholic)	Sisters' college	1954	1997	
College of Notre Dame	Wilton	Private (Catholic)	Sisters' college	1961	1972	
Paier College	Bridgeport	Private (for-profit)	Arts school	1946	2025	
Saint Alphonsus College	Suffield	Private (Catholic)	Seminary	1963	1990	
St. Basil College Seminary	Stamford	Private (Ukrainian Catholic)	Seminary	1939	2009	
St. Thomas Seminary	Bloomfield	Private (Catholic)	Seminary	1897	1980	
St. Vincent's College	Bridgeport	Private (Catholic)	Health professions school	1991	2018	Acquired by Sacred Heart University of Fairfield
Seat of Wisdom College	Litchfield	Private (Catholic)	Sisters' college	1963	1967	
Silvermine College of Art	New Canaan	Private	School of art	1951	1971	
Wilcox College of Nursing	Middletown	Private	Nursing school	1908	1997	

== Gallery ==
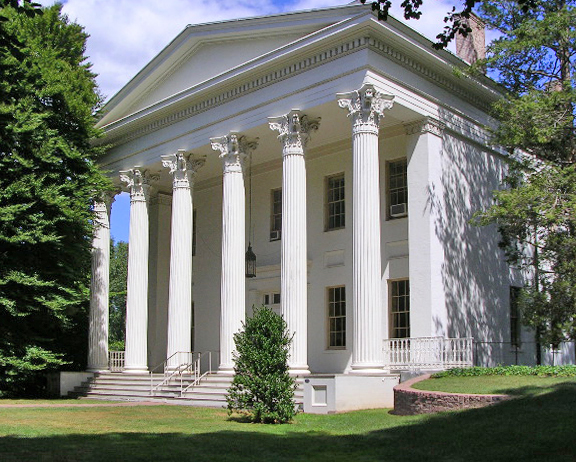
The Samuel Wadsworth Russell House, Wesleyan University

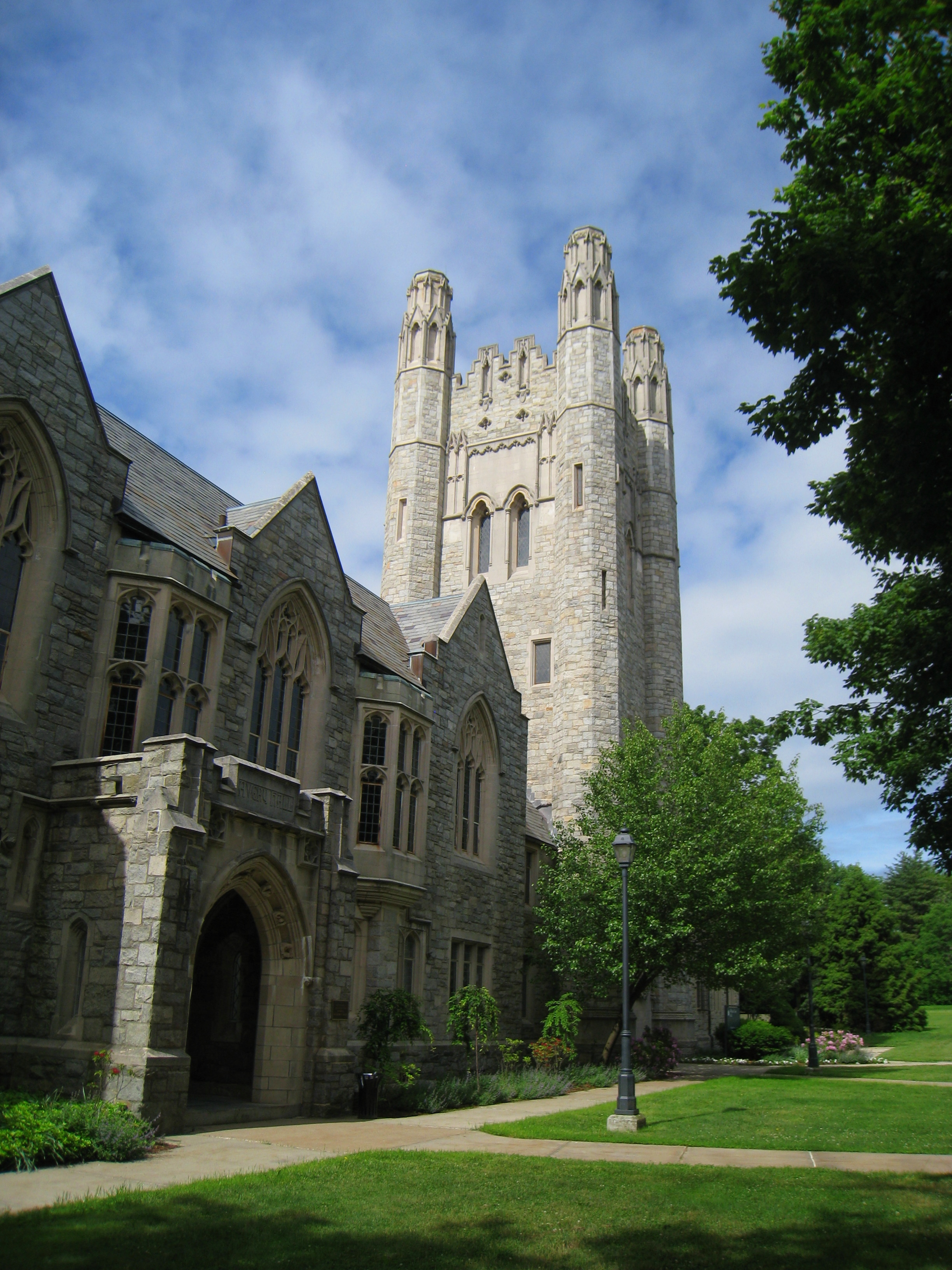
University of Connecticut School of Law

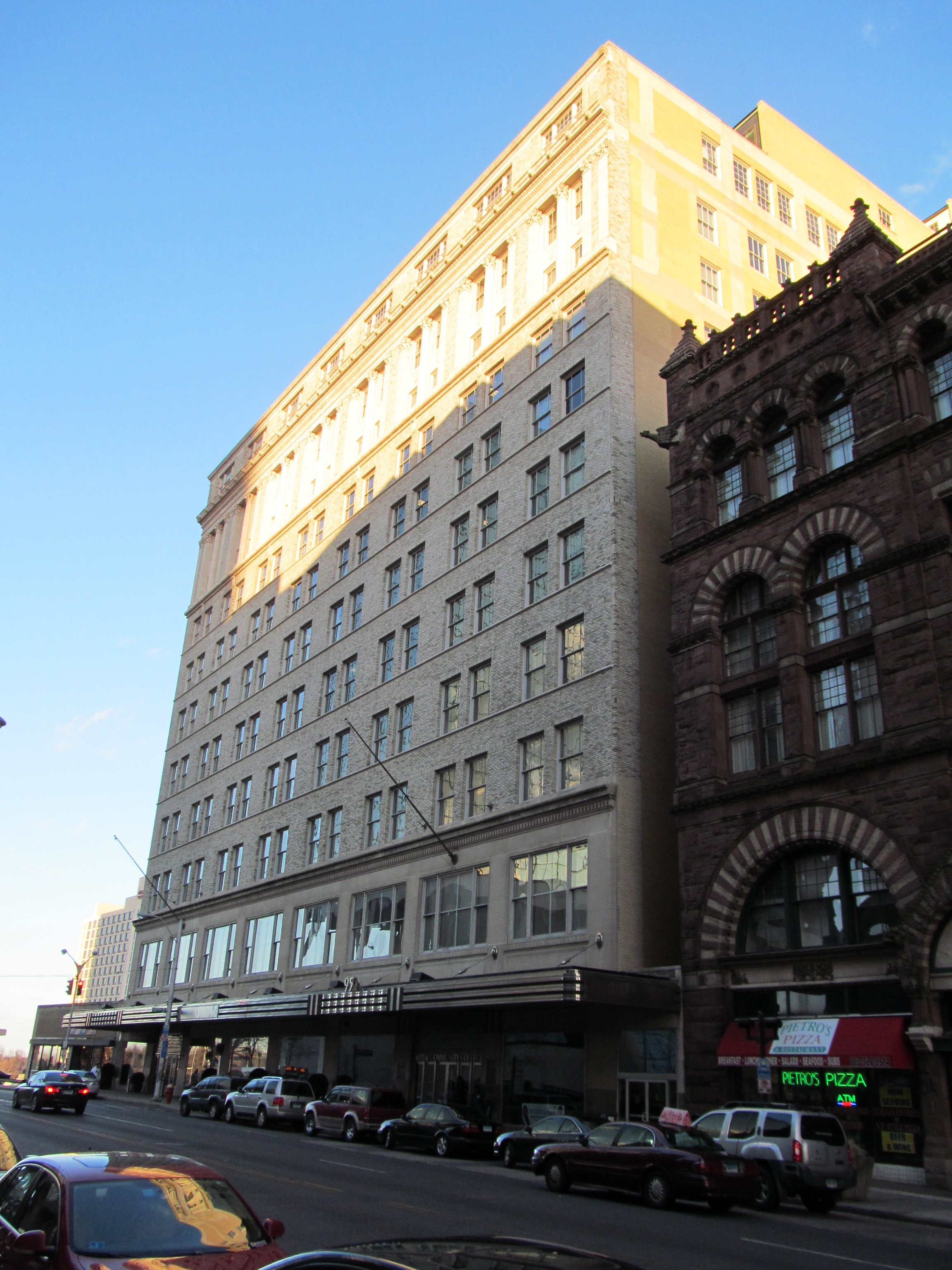
Capital Community College, Hartford

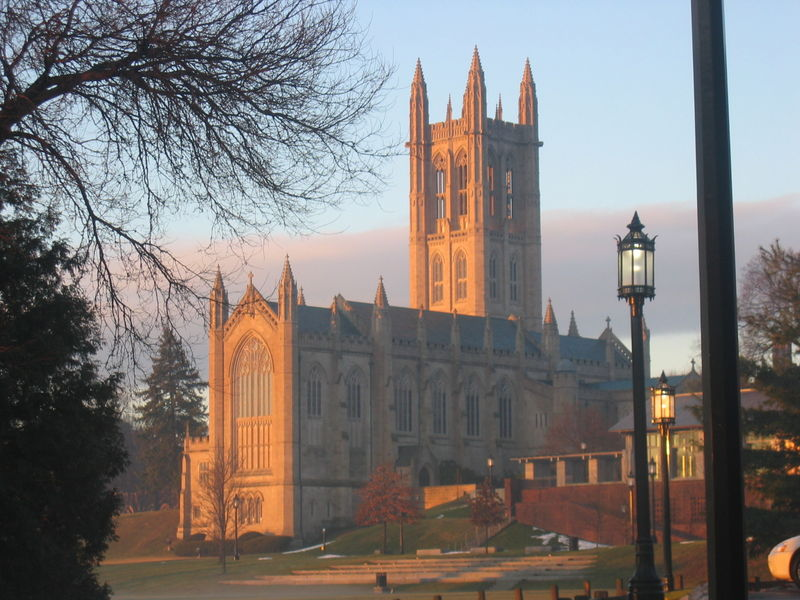
Trinity College Chapel

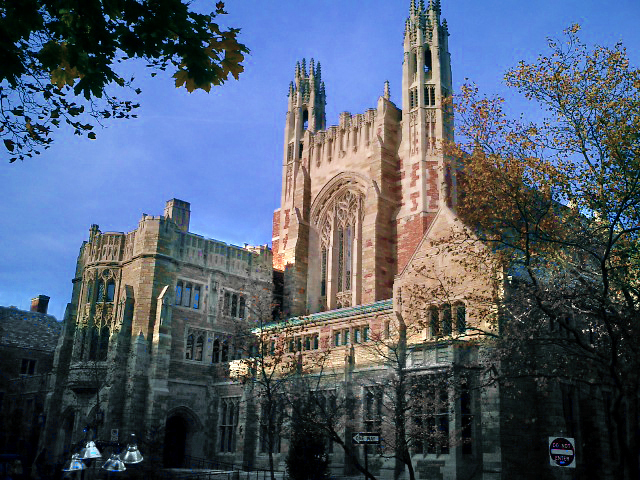
Yale Law School

== See also ==
- List of college athletic programs in Connecticut
- Higher education in the United States
- Lists of American institutions of higher education

== References and notes ==
General

- National Center for Education Statistics. "Integrated Postsecondary Education Data System".

Specific
