= An Act Concerning Gun Violence Prevention and Children's Safety =

Law in Connecticut, U.S.

- Seal of Connecticut

Connecticut General Assembly
- Territorial extent: State of Connecticut
- Passed by: Governor Dannel Malloy
- Passed: April 3, 2013
- Enacted: April 4, 2013
- Assented to: April 4, 2013
- Introduced by: Rep. Brendan Sharkey
- Member(s) in charge: Sen. Donald Williams
- Status: In force

An Act Concerning Gun Violence Prevention and Children's Safety, also known as Public Law 13-3 or Connecticut Senate Bill No. 1160, is a bill concerning gun laws in Connecticut. The legislation was introduced by Senator Donald Williams in the state senate and by House Speaker Brendan Sharkey in the state House of Representatives. It was cosponsored by Rep. Ezequiel Santiago, Rep. Matthew Ritter, Rep. Matthew Lesser, Rep. Larry B. Butler, Rep. Auden Grogins, Rep. Patricia A. Dillon, Rep. Catherine F. Abercrombie, and Senator Andres Ayala. The bi-partisan bill passed the Senate by a vote of 26 to 10 and the House of Representatives by a vote of 105-44 on April 3, 2013.

The law is considered the "toughest", "strongest" and "most comprehensive" legislation relating to gun control in the United States, according to media outlets and advocacy groups. The legislation was introduced in response to the Sandy Hook Elementary School shooting, which occurred on December 14, 2012. Perpetrator Adam Lanza shot and killed 26 people, including 20 children, after murdering his mother and stealing her legally purchased firearms. Under Connecticut General Statutes in force on December 14, 2012, Lanza was in criminal possession of firearms after murdering his mother and as he left his home and headed to Sandy Hook Elementary.

== Provisions ==
The law includes the following provisions regarding specific gun types and firearm magazines, among others:

- Prohibit any sales of gun magazines or clip that holds more than ten rounds. The law bans any future sales, current owners can keep their magazines over ten rounds, but such magazines must be registered with the Department of Emergency Services and Public Protection (DESPP) .
- Extends the law definition of an assault rifle and expands the list of state-banned assault weapons, but eliminates the pre-existing registration requirements and the ban on the sale or transfer of assault weapons that were manufactured and lawfully obtained on or before September 13, 1994.
- Requires all gun sales or transfers to include a background check.

The law also includes the following precautionary measures:

- The creation of a database of people convicted of weapons charges. (This database is, however, only accessible by law enforcement)
- Requires certificates for gun sales, including ammunition sales.
- Increases penalties for gun-related charges.
- Schools within Connecticut, including colleges and universities, would be required to create security plans. School faculty would also go through first aid and mental health training.
- Increases punishments for bullying.

== Reactions ==
Many politicians and groups praised the new law, which was widely viewed by lawmakers as a balance between "addressing the problem of gun violence while protecting the constitutional rights of law-abiding gun owners, hunters and sportsmen." Connecticut Governor Dannel Malloy said that "this is a profoundly emotional day for everyone in this room". Joe Aresimowicz, Connecticut House of Representatives Majority Leader, said about the law, "I pray today's bill—the most far-reaching gun safety legislation in the country—will prevent other families from ever experiencing the dreadful loss that the 26 Sandy Hook families have felt". The selectman for Newtown, Pat Llodra, said she was "pleased" with the new law.

Many parents of Sandy Hook victims backed the legislation. Parents Jimmy Greene and Nelba Marquez-Greene said that the "cooperative spirit" of the Connecticut General Assembly and governor "should be a model for Congress, when the Senate considers legislation next week to reduce gun violence". The National Rifle Association, an advocacy group to promote the Second Amendment, criticized the new law. Executive Vice President Wayne LaPierre said that the new law is a part of a "decade-long agenda against firearms". President of the NRA David Keene said the legislation was "a real threat". President Barack Obama announced that he would make a speech about gun control at the University of Hartford in West Hartford.

Many legal, law-abiding, free-citizen Connecticut resident firearm owners see this as infringement upon the Second Amendment to the United States constitution and Article 1, Section 15 of the Connecticut state constitution. Nevertheless, the law was ruled to be constitutional in its entirety, except for its prohibition of a single non-semiautomatic firearm (the Remington Tactical Rifle Model 7615).

Connecticut State Law Section 53-202d requires a "Certificate of Possession" containing Firearm Owners Protection Act prohibited "registry" elements defined by usage in the Gun Control Act of 1968 establishing a "centralized registry", in effect, a firearm description with the owner name and address resulting in the prohibited "registry" as shown below:

"The certificate shall contain a description of the firearm that identifies it uniquely, including all identification marks, the full name, address, date of birth and thumbprint of the owner, and any other information as the department may deem appropriate." - Connecticut State Law, Section 53-202d

== Legal challenges ==
- On April 13, 2013, the gun rights organization Disabled Americans for Firearms Rights filed a lawsuit in New London Superior Court, arguing that the expanded assault weapons ban is unconstitutionally vague and further violates the state's constitutional provision that guarantees citizens the right to bear arms in self-defense.
- Newtown-based gun rights group National Shooting Sports Foundation filed a federal lawsuit challenging Connecticut's newly enacted gun control legislation on July 8, 2013. The plaintiffs argue that the Connecticut General Assembly illegally enacted the law with an "emergency certification" to circumvent the normal legislative process that includes public hearings and consideration of the bill by a host of legislative committees. The plaintiffs further argue that the law "violates the foundation members' rights to bear arms as guaranteed by the Second Amendment to the U.S. Constitution and Article I, Section 15, of the Connecticut Constitution." State officials led by Governor Dannel Malloy and Attorney General George Jepsen argue the strict gun control law is constitutional and vow to "vigorously defend" it in court.

== See also ==
- Gun laws in Connecticut
- NY SAFE Act
- Gun laws in the United States by state
