= Mendham, New Jersey =

Mendham, New Jersey may refer to:

- Mendham Township, New Jersey, a township in Morris County, New Jersey, US
- Mendham Borough, New Jersey, a borough in Morris County, New Jersey, US
