= Million Dollar Secret season 2 =

Season of reality television series

Million Dollar Secret
- Season 2
- Promotional poster
- Hosted by: Peter Serafinowicz
- No. of contestants: 14
- Winner: Nick Pellecchia
- Runners-up: Lauren Gierth; Kaleb Moon
- No. of episodes: 8

Release
- Original network: Netflix
- Original release: April 15 – April 29, 2026

Season chronology
- ← Previous; Season 1

The second season of Million Dollar Secret was first released on Netflix on April 15, 2026, and concluded on April 29, 2026. Nick won the season, defeating Lauren Gierth and Kaleb Moon.

== Format ==
Fourteen contestants reside together in a luxurious lakeside estate known as "The Stag," located at Château Okanagan in Kelowna, British Columbia, Canada. On the first day, each player opens a box — one contains $1,000,000. The contestant who finds it becomes the millionaire and must conceal their identity for the duration of the game.

The remaining contestants aim to determine who is secretly holding the prize money. At the end of each episode, players vote out the person they most suspect. If the Millionaire is eliminated, the money is re-hidden in a new box and the game continues.

== Contestants ==
The cast of Million Dollar Secret features fourteen contestants from diverse professional and personal backgrounds, ranging in age from their 20s to their 60s. Each contestant brings a unique approach to the game, shaped by their real-world experiences — from law enforcement and education to hospitality and entrepreneurship. While only one player begins the game as the secret Millionaire, all contestants are tasked with navigating trust, deception, and psychological strategy to either protect or uncover the truth.

| Name | Room Key | Age | Hometown | Status | Result |
|---|---|---|---|---|---|
| Nick Pellecchia | The Giraffe | 27 | Mendham, New Jersey | Millionaire (Note: This Guest became the New Millionaire due to an Advantage by a previous Millionaire or Guest.) | Winner (Episode 8) |
| Lauren Gierth | The Boar | 43 | Richland, Washington | Guest | Runner-up (Episode 8) |
| Kaleb Moon | The Eagle | 44 | Lead Hill, Arkansas | Ex-Millionaire (Note: This Guest was previously the Millionaire before an Advantage was played.) | Runner-up (Episode 8) |
| Kat Ellis | The Bull | 26 | Boston, Massachusetts | Guest | Eliminated (Episode 8) |
| Kevin Moranz | The Sheep | 26 | Topeka, Kansas | Guest | Eliminated (Episode 7) |
| Daisy Macklin Skarning | The Frog | 50 | Edina, Minnesota | Guest | Eliminated (Episode 7) |
| Umeko Peterson | The Gazelle | 27 | Kapolei, Hawaii | Millionaire | Eliminated (Episode 6) |
| Hunter Call | The Snake | 25 | Los Angeles, California | Guest | Eliminated (Episode 6) |
| Melissa Austin-Weeks | The Bear | 61 | Fort Worth, Texas | Guest | Eliminated (Episode 5) |
| Kasey Coffey | The Rhinoceros | 33 | Brooklyn, New York | Guest | Eliminated (Episode 5) |
| Lauren Tennery | The Mouse | 25 | South Lake Tahoe, California | Guest | Eliminated (Episode 3) |
| Tarek Ahmed | The Wolf | 24 | Los Angeles, California | Guest | Eliminated (Episode 2) |
| Natalie Noisom | The Rabbit | 29 | Miami, Florida | Guest | Eliminated (Episode 2) |
| Altie Holcomb | The Tiger | 55 | Philadelphia, Pennsylvania | Millionaire (Note: This Guest was the original Millionaire at the start of the game.) | Eliminated (Episode 2) |

=== Future appearances ===
In 2026, Nick Pellecchia appeared on season four of Perfect Match.

== Season summary ==
Million Dollar Secret season summary
| Episode | | | Millionaire | Challenge winner(s) | | | Clue Reveal | Eliminated |
| No. | Title | Air date | Millionaire | Millionaire's Agenda | Guest Activity | Trophy Room | Clue Reveal | Eliminated |
|---|---|---|---|---|---|---|---|---|
| 1 | "Millionaire Mind Games" | April 15, 2026 | Altie | Success | Altie, Hunter, Kevin, Lauren T., Melissa, Natalie, Umeko | Hunter | The Millionaire is a firstborn (Note: Natalie received this clue in her box at the beginning of the game.) | Altie |
| 1 | "Millionaire Mind Games" | April 15, 2026 | Altie | Success | Altie, Hunter, Kevin, Lauren T., Melissa, Natalie, Umeko | Hunter | First Millionaire's Agenda Clue | Altie |
| 2 | "Million Dollar Hat Trick" | April 15, 2026 | Kaleb | Success | Daisy; Kaleb, Kevin, Lauren G., Melissa, Natalie | Melissa | First Guest Activity Clue | Natalie |
| 2 | "Million Dollar Hat Trick" | April 15, 2026 | Kaleb | Success | Daisy; Kaleb, Kevin, Lauren G., Melissa, Natalie | Melissa | First Guest Activity Clue | Tarek |
| 3 | "Troubled Waters" | April 15, 2026 | Kaleb | Success | Daisy, Hunter, Kasey, Kat, Kevin | Kat | The Millionaire's First Name Clue | Lauren T. |
| 4 | "1999 Problems" | April 22, 2026 | Nick | Success | Kasey, Kevin | Kevin | The Millionaire's Birth Year Clue | Kasey |
| 4 | "1999 Problems" | April 22, 2026 | Nick | Success | Kasey, Kevin | Kevin | The Millionaire's Birth Year Clue | Melissa |
| 5 | "A Silent Assassin" | April 22, 2026 | Nick | Success | Kaleb | None (Note: The Millionaire completed their secret mission and managed that No trophy room for this round) | | Hunter |
| 6 | "House of Dummies" | April 22, 2026 | Umeko | Success | Lauren G., Kevin, Umeko | Lauren G. | The Millionaire's Occupation Clue | Umeko |
| 7 | "Killer Croquet" | April 29, 2026 | Kaleb | Success | Kat, Kevin | Kat | The Millionaire's Occupation Clue | Daisy |
| 7 | "Killer Croquet" | April 29, 2026 | Kaleb | Success | Kat, Kevin | Kat | The Millionaire's Occupation Clue | Kevin |
| 8 | "Lie Hard" | April 29, 2026 | Kaleb | —N/a | Lauren G., Nick | —N/a | | Kat |
| 8 | "Lie Hard" | April 29, 2026 | Kaleb | —N/a | Nick | —N/a | | Kaleb |
| 8 | "Lie Hard" | April 29, 2026 | Kaleb | —N/a | Nick | —N/a | | Lauren G. |

Millionaire Secret Agenda
| Episode | Millionaire | Agenda | Reward | Penalty |
|---|---|---|---|---|
| 1 | Altie | Say the phrase "No Cap" (Note: other potential phrases were "See you later Aligator", "Give me some skin", "Sorry, not Sorry" or "Bye Felicia") 10 times with other Guest before activity | Kill shot (if they survive the elimination, they choose one person to be automatically eliminated) | Three votes against them |
| 2 | Kaleb | Put their hat on three different Guests before 10pm | Kill shot (if they survive the elimination, they choose one person to be automatically eliminated) | Three votes against them |
| 3 | Kaleb | Follow Kevin for 45 minutes (within 15 feet and time will be reset after 30 seconds of separation) before the elimination dinner | Move the money to another guest if they survive the elimination (chosen) or two extra votes | Three votes against them |
| 4 | Nick | Say to 4 guests who their celebrity doppelganger is before the winners of the previous activity are announced to go to the trophy room | Double Kill shot (if they survive the elimination, they choose two people to be automatically eliminated) | Four votes against them |
| 5 | Nick | Clip 3 clothespins to three different guest before the guest activity | No trophy room for this round & negate two votes against them | Four votes against them & trophy room clue is much simpler |
| 6 | Umeko | Say six foreign phrases (Note: "Konnichiwa", "Hasta La Vista", "Bonjour", "Mahalo" and "Ciao") to three guests before winning guest enters the next trophy room | Kill shot (if they survive the elimination, they choose one person to be automatically eliminated) | Three votes against them |
| 7 | Kaleb | Attempt to high five two guests and miss before the guest activity ends | Kill shot (if they survive the elimination, they choose one person to be automatically eliminated) | Two votes against them |

Guest Secret Agenda
| Episode | Guest | Agenda | Reward | Penalty |
|---|---|---|---|---|
| 5 | Umeko | Hit three guests in head with beach ball | They become new Millionaire (if they and the current millionaire survive the elimination) | Four votes against them |

== Voting history ==
Color key:

Winner
Runner-up
No Vote
Eliminated
Vote blocked

Voting history
| Round | 1 | 2 | | 3 | 4 | 5 | 6 | 7 | | Finale | |
|---|---|---|---|---|---|---|---|---|---|---|---|
| Millionaire | Altie | Kaleb (Note: A new Millionaire was selected after the previous Millionaire's elimination.) | | | Nick (Note: The Millionaire changed because the Move the Money advantage was used by a Millionaire or a Guest.) | | Umeko | Kaleb | | | Nick |
| Immunity | None | | Daisy; Kaleb; Kevin; Lauren G. Melissa; ~~Natalie~~ | None | | Kaleb | None | | | | |
| Eliminated | Altie | Natalie | Tarek | Lauren T. | Kasey; Melissa | Hunter | Umeko | Daisy | Kevin | Kat | None |
| Vote | 9–2–1–1–1 | Not published | Killshot (Note: The Millionaire won the Kill Shot, meaning their vote was the only vote that counts at this Elimination Dinner.) | Not published | Double; Killshot (Note: The Millionaire won the Double Deadly Shot, which means that all votes were canceled and his votes were the only ones that counted in this Elimination Dinner.) | 4–2 | 5–2 | 3–2–1 | Killshot | 2–0 | None |
| Nick | Altie | Not published | No; Vote | Not published | Kasey; Melissa | Hunter | Daisy | Daisy | No; Vote | Kat | Winner (Episode 8) |
| Kaleb | Altie | Tarek | No; Vote | Lauren T. | ~~Kat~~ | ~~Nick~~ | Umeko | Kevin | No; Vote | No; Vote | Runner-up (Episode 8) |
| Lauren G. | Natalie | Lauren T. | No; Vote | Not published | ~~Kat~~ | Hunter | Umeko | Daisy | No; Vote | Kat | Runner-up (Episode 8) |
| Kat | Altie | Not published | No; Vote | Lauren T. | ~~Nick~~ | Hunter | Umeko | Daisy | No; Vote | No; Vote | Eliminated (Episode 8) |
| Kevin | Altie | Not published | No; Vote | Not published | ~~Nick~~ | Nick | Umeko | Nick | No; Vote | Eliminated (Episode 7) | |
| Daisy | Altie | Not published | No; Vote | Not published | ~~Kat~~ | Nick | Umeko | Kevin | Eliminated (Episode 7) | | |
| Umeko | Kevin | Not published | No; Vote | Not published | ~~Kat~~ | Hunter | Daisy | Eliminated (Episode 6) | | | |
| Hunter | Altie | Natalie | No; Vote | Lauren T. | ~~Kat~~ | ~~Nick~~ | Eliminated (Episode 6) | | | | |
| Melissa | Altie | Not published | No; Vote | Kaleb | ~~Nick~~ | Eliminated (Episode 5) | | | | | |
| Kasey | Altie | Not published | No; Vote | Kaleb | ~~Nick~~ | Eliminated (Episode 5) | | | | | |
| Lauren T. | Altie | Not published | No; Vote | Kaleb | Eliminated (Episode 3) | | | | | | |
| Tarek | Umeko | Not published | No; Vote | Eliminated (Episode 2) | | | | | | | |
| Natalie | Daisy | Not published | Eliminated (Episode 2) | | | | | | | | |
| Altie | Natalie | Eliminated (Episode 2) | | | | | | | | | |

== Episodes ==
| No. overall | No. in season | Title | Original release date |
|---|---|---|---|
| 9 | 1 | "Millionaire Mind Games" | April 15, 2026 |
| 10 | 2 | "Million Dollar Hat Trick" | April 15, 2026 |
| 11 | 3 | "Troubled Waters" | April 15, 2026 |
| 12 | 4 | "1999 Problems" | April 22, 2026 |
| 13 | 5 | "A Silent Assassin" | April 22, 2026 |
| 14 | 6 | "House of Dummies" | April 22, 2026 |
| 15 | 7 | "Killer Croquet" | April 29, 2026 |
| 16 | 8 | "Lie Hard" | April 29, 2026 |
