= Mount Elizabeth =

Mount Elizabeth may refer to:

- Mount Elizabeth (Antarctica)
- Mount Elizabeth (Victoria)
- Mount Elizabeth Archeological Site, an archaeological site in Florida
- Mount Elizabeth Hospital, a private hospital in Singapore
- Mount Elizabeth Secondary School, a public school in British Columbia, Canada.
- Mount Elizabeth Station, a pastoral lease in Western Australia.
