= Mount Sacred Heart College =

College in Hamden, Connecticut

Coordinates: 41.366°N 72.9338°W

- Former name: Mount Sacred Heart Junior College
- Type: Sisters' college
- Active: 1946–1997
- Founder: Sister Mary Antonine Signorelli
- Affiliations: Apostles of the Sacred Heart of Jesus
- Religious affiliation: Roman Catholic
- Location: Hamden, Connecticut, United States
- Language: English and Latin

Mount Sacred Heart College was a small Catholic women's college in Hamden, Connecticut, United States. It was founded in 1946 as Mount Sacred Heart Junior College and closed in mid-1997 due to low enrollment.

The college was founded by Sister Mary Antonine Signorelli and operated by the Missionary Zelatrices of the Sacred Heart of Jesus, an Italian religious institute now known as the Apostles of the Sacred Heart of Jesus.

== Academics ==
Mount Sacred Heart was designed as a sisters' college, or a college primarily designed to educate nuns. In light of its mission, the curriculum focused on theology, although it was not limited to that area. Faculty members offered courses in Latin, education, writing, and other subjects.

Courses were initially offered on the traditional American two-semester system, but by 1966 the college had adopted a trimester system. Graduates received associate degrees.

== Legacy ==
The Mount Sacred Heart campus is now used by the Zelatrices' successor, the Apostles of the Sacred Heart, to operate Sacred Heart Academy, a preparatory school for high school-aged girls.

The only remaining sisters' college in the United States is the Assumption College for Sisters in Mendham Borough, New Jersey.

== See also ==
- List of current and historical women's universities and colleges
