= TTAG =

TTAG may refer to:

== Organizations ==
- The Truth About Guns
- Trinidad and Tobago Air Guard
