= The Truth About Guns =

Blog about firearms

- Website type: Blog
- Available in: English
- Owner: Carbon Media
- Website: thetruthaboutguns.com
- Registration: Optional
- Launched: 1 February 2010; 16 years ago

The Truth About Guns (TTAG) is an American blog about firearms which launched in February 2010. The site's articles and posts cover a wide range of topics including gun politics, firearms products and accessories, current events relating to firearms, firearms business, ethics relating to firearms, firearms culture, firearms technology, and other firearms-related articles. The staff updates the site with about five articles per day, with reduced updates on weekends.

== History ==
Robert Farago founded The Truth About Guns in February 2010 to "explore the ethics, morality, business, politics, culture, technology, practice, strategy, dangers and fun of guns". It claims to be the most popular firearms related blog in the world. In April 2013, the website was approaching nearly a million dollars in revenue per year.

In 2015, it conducted a recreation of the Paris Charlie Hebdo shooting to see if defensive gun use could have been effective. The simulations, using paintball guns instead of the real attackers' AK-47s, were repeated several times using different scenarios. Volunteers were used for civilians. The only survivor was the participant who fled immediately without trying to engage the attackers, and the defenders never succeeded in shooting both attackers. One unsuccessful defender said, "I still got killed but I did better than I thought I would." Volunteer participants played the civilians in the simulation. According to the organizers the simulated terrorists were trained firearms instructors. This contrasted with a previous recreation where trained defenders defeated untrained attackers, indicating that training was a factor in the results.

== Political activism ==
The website has been highly vocal in its opposition to gun control measures that have emerged since its founding such as the Assault Weapons Ban of 2013, the Connecticut assault weapons ban of 2013, the New York SAFE Act, and numerous other gun control measures on the local, state, and federal level. They held a campaign on their website called "Stand Strong Connecticut" in which readers of the website sent in pictures of themselves and a sign that said Stand Strong Connecticut in support of gun owners in Connecticut who were beginning to receive letters from the Connecticut State Police stating that they were no longer legally entitled to own some of their firearms which were banned under 2013 Gun Control Legislation.

== Features ==
The site's "Irresponsible Gun Owner of the Day" feature was mentioned by Dan Baum in a Wall Street Journal article on gun safety.

== Criticism ==
Since early 2013, the blog has been at odds with Moms Demand Action, which Farago refers to as "our most formidable adversary" — and whose founder Shannon Watts called the blog's members "Gun Bullies" after a commenter revealed her home address and the staff refused to remove it.
