= Tuckahoe (Jensen Beach, Florida) =

- U.S. National Register of Historic Places
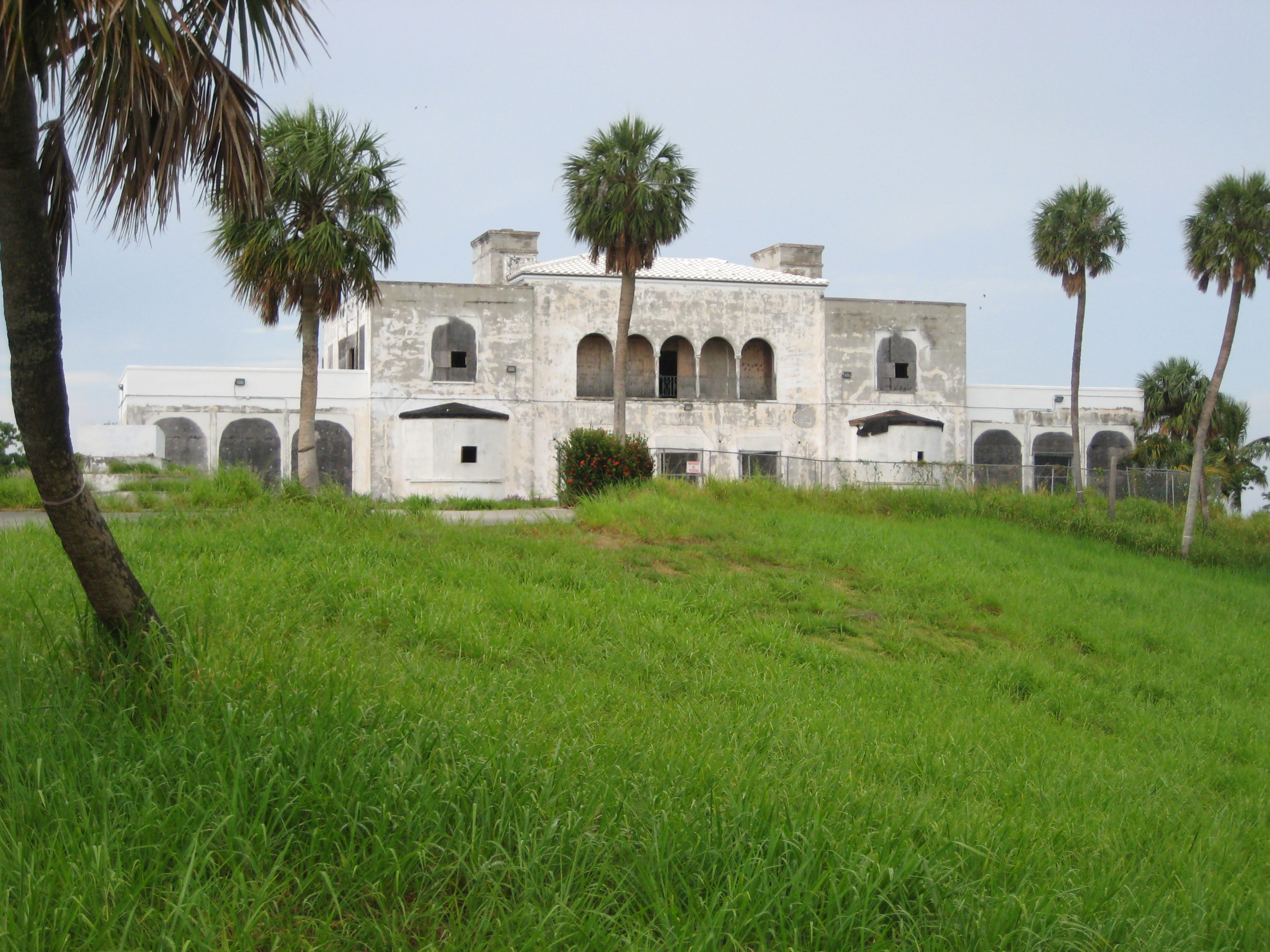
- Front View of Tuckahoe on Mount Elizabeth
- Location: 1707 N.E. Indian River Drive, Jensen Beach, Florida
- Coordinates: 27.22791°N 80.21279°W
- Built: 1938
- NRHP reference No.: 05001339
- Added to NRHP: November 30, 2005

Tuckahoe, also known as the Leach Mansion or as the Mansion at Tuckahoe, is an historic home located at 1921 North East Indian River Drive in Jensen Beach, Florida, United States. The name was thought to be a Native American word for "welcome". It is inside the present day Indian RiverSide Park and is atop the Mount Elizabeth Archeological Site, which was added to the National Register of Historic Places on September 14, 2002.

On November 30, 2005, Tuckahoe itself was added to the National Register of Historic Places. On November 4, 2010, the Halpatiokee Chapter Daughters of the American Revolution placed a plaque on the building.

== History ==
Tuckahoe was built in 1938 as the home of Willaford Ransom Leach (1899–1984) and his Coca-Cola heiress wife Anne Winship Bates Leach (1896–1977). Sitting on approximately 54 acres of riverfront woodland and rolling lawns, Tuckahoe was the hub of social life in Martin County and the setting for countless parties attended by the local social set and WWII soldiers from Camp Murphy. Mrs. Leach, who helped to start The Garden Club, also donated the funds necessary to build the original building for the well-known Bascomb Palmer Eye Institute in Miami. The Leaches lived in it until 1950 when they moved to Palm Beach and sold the property to the Sisters of St. Joseph based in St. Augustine. The Sisters of St. Joseph added two dormitory wings to the building and moved their novitiate and Saint Joseph College of Florida, which was then a sisters' formation college to the property. In 1957, the novitiate was moved to the end of Britt Road and the college was converted into a regular liberal arts college. The college closed in May 1972 and its campus including Tuckahoe was sold to Florida Institute of Technology for its Jensen Beach Campus.

Florida Institute of Technology, or FIT, as it was then known, used the Leach Mansion as its administration building. After FIT closed its Jensen Beach campus in 1986, the property was sold to a land developer and eventually was acquired by Martin County in 1997.

Tuckahoe remained unused and in disrepair until 2009 when its rehabilitation was completed by the Friends of Mount Elizabeth. Architect for the project was Bert Bender of Key West The mansion, as renovated, consists of eight floors in an art deco style which include a wedding suite with groom's room, a catering kitchen, and a banquet room. Renovations also added terraces alongside the building and an amphitheater for to accommodate performances. Since completion of the renovations in 2009, the site has become a popular location for weddings. The facility can be toured by appointment.

== See also ==
- Mount Elizabeth Archeological Site
- Saint Joseph College of Florida
- Jensen Beach Campus of F.I.T.
- National Register of Historic Places listings in Florida
