= Saint Joseph College of Florida =

Catholic college (1890–1972)

Coordinates: 27.2278°N 80.2127°W

St. Joseph College of Florida
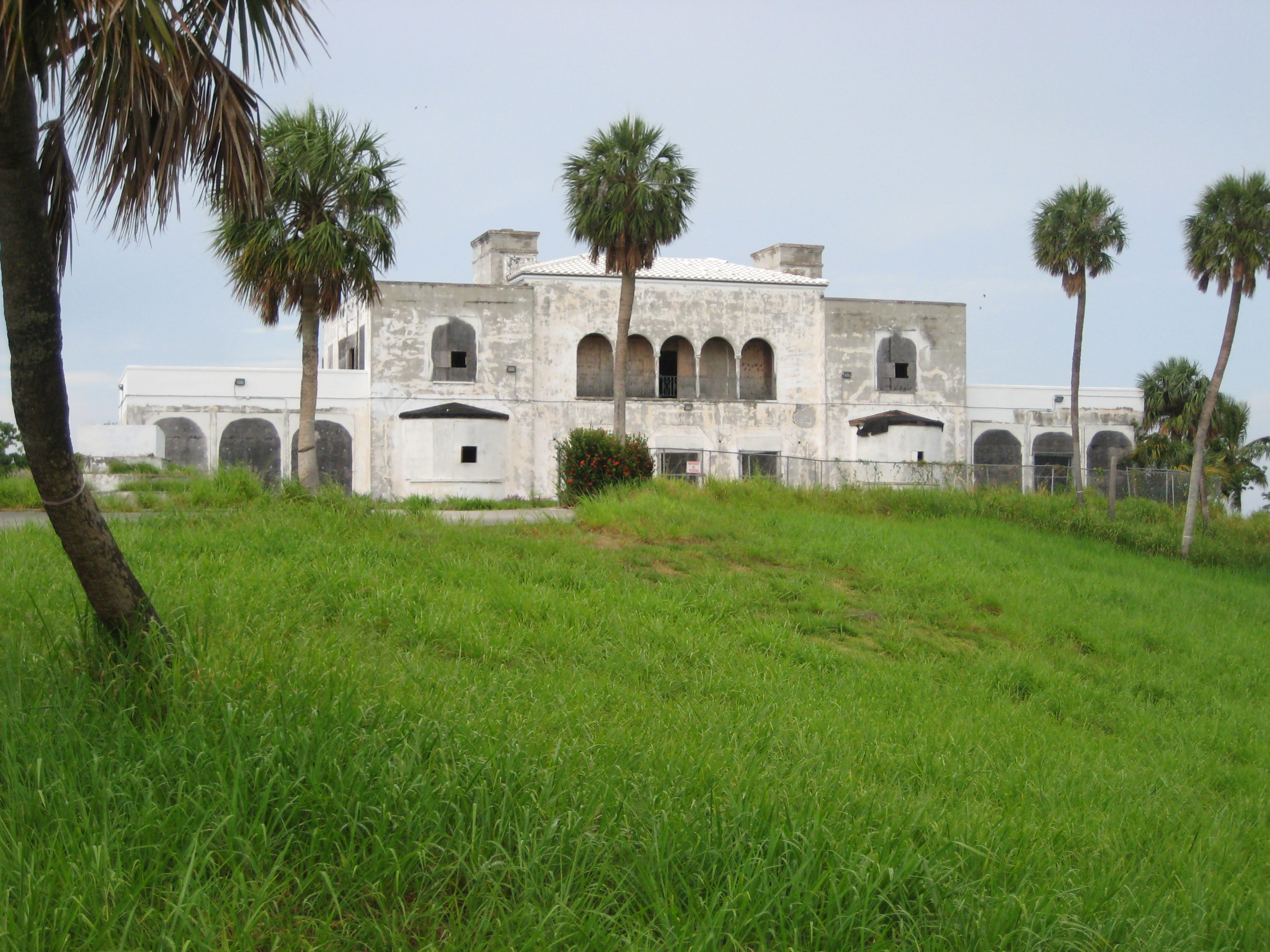
- The former Jensen Beach novitiate and college administration building: Tuckahoe atop Mount Elizabeth
- Type: began as sisters' college; became two-year junior college
- Active: 1890–1972
- Affiliations: Roman Catholic
- Location: St. Augustine and Jensen Beach, Florida, United States

Saint Joseph College of Florida (1890–1972) was a college operated by the Sisters of St. Joseph of Florida in St. Augustine and in Jensen Beach, Florida.

== History ==
=== 1890–1966 ===
Saint Joseph College of Florida was started in 1890 in St. Augustine as a sisters' college, or sisters' formation college, by the Sisters of St. Joseph, a Roman Catholic teaching order. In 1950, the order bought the Tuckahoe Mansion on Mount Elizabeth, an ancient Native American midden in Jensen Beach and, after adding two dormitory wings to the mansion, moved the college and their novitiate into it. In 1957, the Sisters of St. Joseph converted the college into a regular liberal arts college, but only offered a two-year curriculum even though it was chartered as a four-year institution. Admission was still limited to members or potential members of the order.

=== 1966–1972 ===
In the fall of 1966, lay men and women were admitted but only on a non-residential basis. In January of the following year, the Sisters of St. Joseph decided to admit lay residential students, Accordingly, they bought a large tract on the west side of Indian River Drive and started building on it two three-story dormitories for residential students, one for men and one for women. In between the two dorms they built a one-story cafeteria building.

The Sisters based their hopes for expansion on the determination that the Northeastern United States had a large Catholic population and exported large numbers of Catholic college students because its local Catholic institutions were not able to meet the demand. It was believed that Saint Joseph College would have no problems attracting these students. The Sisters moved their novitiate to property at the end of Britt Road in North Stuart before the first residential students arrived for the fall term of 1967, but the transition to a co-ed residential two-year college was not a smooth one. The new dorms were not finished and the residential students had to be housed in an old hotel building in downtown Stuart and bussed to the campus. The lack of adequate residential supervision resulted in disciplinary problems as well as friction with the local community. Also the haste of the conversion forced the college to operate on an 'open admissions' basis in order to fill its classes, since most of the students the Sisters had hoped to attract had already made commitments to attend other colleges. Having started off on the wrong foot, the college found that it was impossible to overcome the negative image it had acquired and was not able to break even financially and closed in May 1972. The campus was sold to Florida Institute of Technology for its Jensen Beach Campus.
