= Gerry Gallagher =

American football player and coach (born 1951)

Current position
- Title: Special teams coordinator
- Team: Delbarton School (NJ)

Biographical details
- Born: December 25, 1951 (age 74)

Playing career
- 1969–1972: William Paterson

Coaching career (HC unless noted)
- 1973–1976: Morris Catholic HS (NJ) (assistant)
- 1977–1983: Morris Catholic HS (NJ)
- 1984–1985: Edinboro (PA) (OC)
- 1986–1988: Saint Francis (PA)
- 1989–1996: William Paterson
- 1997–2010: Montville HS (NJ)
- 2011–2012: Boonton HS (NJ) (assistant)
- 2013–?: Parsippany HS (NJ) (OC)
- ?–present: Delbarton School (NJ) (ST)

Head coaching record
- Overall: 44–64–1 (college)
- Bowls: 0–1
- Tournaments: 1–1 (NCAA D-III playoffs)

Gerry Gallagher (born December 25, 1951) is an American football coach and former player. He is currently the offensive coordinator at Parsippany High School in Parsippany, New Jersey, a position he has held since 2013. Gallagher served as the head coach at Saint Francis University in Loretto, Pennsylvania from 1986 to 1988 and at William Paterson University from 1989 to 1996, compiling a career college football record of 44–64–1.

A native of Rockaway, New Jersey, Gallagher attended Morris Catholic High School, where he graduated in 1969. He then attended William Paterson University to play football for the school's first ever team. Gallagher would score the first two touchdowns in the program's history.

Gallagher began his coaching career at Morris Catholic High School, where he served as an assistant coach from 1973 to 1976. In 1977, he became the new head coach and held that position until 1983. Gallagher's first college football coaching job was spent at Edinboro University of Pennsylvania for the 1984 and 1985 seasons as an offensive coordinator, followed by three years at Saint Francis and eight at William Paterson. Since 1997 he has coached at Montville High School in New Jersey and in 2006 guided the Montville Mustangs to the State Championship Game at Giants Stadium.

Through the 2009 college football season, Gallagher is the only William Paterson coach to guide his team to any playoff appearances. In 1991, William Paterson made it to the first round of the ECAC playoffs, and in 1993 they made it to the second round of the NCAA Division III playoffs.

In 2015, Gallagher began coaching the defensive backs at the Delbarton School in Morristown, New Jersey. He was named Special Teams Coordinator at Delbarton in 2016.

In addition, Gallagher was inducted into the New Jersey Football Coaches Association Hall of Fame in 2011 following him being Coach of the Year in 2006.

== Head coaching record ==
=== College ===
Year	Team	Overall	Conference	Standing	Bowl/playoffs
Saint Francis Red Flash (NCAA Division III independent) (1986–1988)
1986	Saint Francis	5–4			
1987	Saint Francis	3–6			
1988	Saint Francis	1–8			
Saint Francis:		7–19			
William Paterson Pioneers (New Jersey Athletic Conference) (1989–1996)
1989	William Paterson	2–7	0–6	7th	
1990	William Paterson	5–5	1–5	6th	
1991	William Paterson	8–2–1	4–1–1	2nd	L ECAC Southwest Bowl
1992	William Paterson	8–2	4–2	3rd	
1993	William Paterson	8–4	3–2	T–2nd	L NCAA Division III Quarterfinal
1994	William Paterson	3–7	3–2	T–3rd	
1995	William Paterson	0–10	0–5	6th	
1996	William Paterson	1–9	0–5	6th	
William Paterson:		35–45–1	15–28–1		
Total:		44–64–1			
