= Million Dollar Secret season 1 =

Season of reality television series

Million Dollar Secret
- Season 1
- Promotional poster
- Hosted by: Peter Serafinowicz
- No. of contestants: 12
- Winner: Cara Kies
- Runners-up: Sam Hubbard; Corey Niles
- No. of episodes: 8

Release
- Original network: Netflix
- Original release: March 26 – April 9, 2025

Season chronology
- Next → Season 2

The first season of Million Dollar Secret was first released on Netflix on March 26, 2025, and concluded on April 9, 2025. Cara Kies won the season, defeating Sam Hubbard and Corey Niles.

== Format ==
Twelve contestants reside together in a luxurious lakeside estate known as "The Stag," located at Château Okanagan in Kelowna, British Columbia, Canada. On the first day, each player opens a box — one contains $1,000,000. The contestant who finds it becomes the "Millionaire" and must conceal their identity for the duration of the game.

The remaining contestants aim to determine who is secretly holding the prize money. At the end of each episode, players vote out the person they most suspect. If the Millionaire is eliminated, the money is re-hidden in a new box and the game continues.

== Contestants ==
The cast of Million Dollar Secret features twelve contestants from diverse professional and personal backgrounds, ranging in age from their 20s to their 60s. Each contestant brings a unique approach to the game, shaped by their real-world experiences — from law enforcement and education to hospitality and entrepreneurship. While only one player begins the game as the secret Millionaire, all contestants are tasked with navigating trust, deception, and psychological strategy to either protect or uncover the truth.

Name	Room Key	Age	Occupation	Hometown	Status	Result
Cara Kies	The Frog	29	In-N-Out Cook	Los Angeles, CA	Millionaire (Note: This Guest became the New Millionaire due to an Advantage by a previous Millionaire or Guest.)	Winner (Episode 8)
Sam Hubbard	The Mouse	41	Police Officer	Brooklyn, NY	Ex-Millionaire (Note: This Guest was previously the Millionaire before an Advantage was played.)	Runner-up (Episode 8)
Corey Niles	The Gazelle	38	Builder	Toronto, ON	Guest	Runner-up (Episode 8)
Sydnee Falkner	The Eagle	32	Medical Sales	Scottsdale, AZ	Guest	Eliminated (Episode 8)
Kyle Wimberley	The Boar	27	Construction Worker	Church Point, LA	Guest	Eliminated (Episode 7)
Jaimi Alexander	The Snake	42	Life Coach	Houston, TX	Guest	Eliminated (Episode 7)
Chris Allen	The Wolf	34	Beverage Brand CEO	New Jersey	Guest	Eliminated (Episode 6)
Lydia Blair	The Tiger	64	Retired Escrow Agent and Poker Player	Dallas, Texas	Guest	Eliminated (Episode 5)
Phil Roundtree	The Bear	41	College Professor and Therapist	Philadelphia, PA	Ex-Millionaire	Eliminated (Episode 5)
Lauren Trefethren	The Bull	35	Stay-at-Home Mother	Fargo, North Dakota	Ex-Millionaire (Note: This Guest was the original Millionaire at the start of the game.)	Eliminated (Episode 3)
Se Young Metzroth	The Rabbit	35	Systems VP	Portland, Oregon	Guest	Eliminated (Episode 2)
Harry Donenfeld	The Sheep	59	Photographer	Maui, Hawaii	Guest	Eliminated (Episode 2)

== Season summary ==
Million Dollar Secret season summary
Episode			Millionaire	Challenge winner(s)				Clue Reveal	Eliminated
No.	Title	Air date	Millionaire	Millionaire's Agenda	Guest Activity	Trophy Room		Clue Reveal	Eliminated
1	"Instant Millionaire"	March 26, 2025	Lauren	Success	Cara, Corey, Lauren, Lydia, Se Young, Sydnee	Lydia		Millionaire Confirmation (Corey, Harry, Lauren, Phillip, Sam, Se Young)	Harry
2	"The Five Suspects"	March 26, 2025	Lauren	Success	Chris, Jaimi, Kyle, Lauren, Sam, Sydnee	Chris		Second Millionaire's; Agenda Clue	Se Young
3	"Going to Hell on a Scholarship"	March 26, 2025	Phil	Failure	Corey, Kyle, Lauren, Phil, Sydnee	Corey		First Guest; Activity Clue	Lauren
4	"Hot Seat for Three"	April 2, 2025	Phil	Success	Kyle, Sydnee, Phil	Kyle		Fourth Millionaire's; Agenda Clue	Phil
5	"The Kill Shot"	April 2, 2025	Sam	Success	Chris, Jaimi, Kyle, Sam	Jaimi		The Millionaire's; Profession Lie	Lydia
6	"911, Misdemeanor, Handcuffs"	April 2, 2025	Sam	Success	Cara, Chris, Corey; Sam	Corey	Success	Check Guest's box (Jaimi)	Chris
7	"The Tale of Two Sisters"	April 9, 2025	Cara	Success	Sydnee, Jaimi	Sydnee	Success	Millionaire has two sisters (Note: Sam received this clue in her box after the swap.)	Jaimi
7	"The Tale of Two Sisters"	April 9, 2025	Cara	Success	Sydnee, Jaimi	Sydnee	Success	Millionaire has two sisters	Kyle
8	"Get Rich or Lie Trying"	April 9, 2025	Cara	—N/a	Corey, Sam	—N/a			Sydnee
8	"Get Rich or Lie Trying"	April 9, 2025	Cara	—N/a	Cara	—N/a			

Millionaire Secret Agenda
Episode	Millionaire	Agenda	Reward	Penalty
1	Lauren	Hug every guest before the activity	Two extra votes	—N/a
2	Lauren	Use five specific song titles in conversation before the end of breakfast	Move the money to another guest if they survive the elimination	—N/a
3	Phil	Get three guests to say no when asked "Do you believe me?"	Negate three votes	One vote against them
4	Phil	Get two guests to scream before the winners of the previous activity are announced to go to the trophy room	Move the money to another guest if they survive the elimination	—N/a
5	Sam	Ask three guests "Can you hear that ringing sound?" and get at least one of them agree before the elimination dinner	Kill shot (only their vote counts for elimination)	Three votes against them
6	Sam	Get three guests to say "Justin Timberlake" before the elimination dinner	One extra vote	One vote against them
7	Cara	Swap seats with three guests before the elimination dinner	Kill shot (if they survive the elimination, they choose one person to be automatically eliminated)	Two votes against them

Trophy Room Secret Agendas
Episode	Guest	Agenda	Reward	Penalty
6	Corey	Get all guests to say "911," "handcuffs," and "misdemeanor" before the elimination dinner	Move the money to another guest	Two votes against them
7	Sydnee	Get two guests to ask "Are you ok?" before the elimination dinner	Immunity (from both the vote and the millionaire's kill shot)	—N/a

== Voting history ==
Color key:

Winner
Runner-up
No Vote
Eliminated
Vote blocked
Extra Vote
Penalty Vote

Voting history
Round	1	2	3			4	5	6	7		Final	
Millionaire	Lauren		Phil (Note: The Millionaire changed because the Move the Money advantage was used by a Millionaire or a Guest.)				Sam (Note: A new Millionaire was selected after the previous Millionaire's elimination.)		Cara			
Eliminated	Harry	Se Young	Tie	Tie	Lauren	Phil	Lydia	Chris	Jaimi	Kyle	Sydnee	None
Vote	Not published	5–3–2–1	5–5–1	5–5	Millionaire's Choice (Note: After two rounds of voting led to a tie, the Millionaire's second vote broke the tie.)	Not published	Killshot (Note: The Millionaire won the Kill Shot, meaning their vote was the only vote that counts at this Elimination Dinner.)	5–3	3–2–1	Killshot	2–0	None
Cara	Not published	Lauren	Sydnee	Sydnee	No; Vote	Not published	~~Sydnee~~	Chris	Kyle	No; Vote	No Vote	Winner (Episode 8)
Corey	Not published	Se Young	Lauren	Lauren	No; Vote	Not published	~~Sydnee~~	Chris	Jaimi	No; Vote	Sydnee	Runner-up (Episode 8)
Sam	Lauren	Phil	Sydnee	Sydnee	No; Vote	Not published	Lydia	Chris	Jaimi	No; Vote	Sydnee	Runner-up (Episode 8)
Sam	Lauren	Phil	Sydnee	Sydnee	No; Vote	Not published	Lydia	Chris (Note: The Millionaire earned extra votes from completing their Secret Agenda.)	Jaimi	No; Vote	Sydnee	Runner-up (Episode 8)
Sydnee	Not published	Lauren	Lauren	Lauren	No; Vote	Phil	~~Lydia~~	Chris	Sam	No; Vote	No Vote	Eliminated (Episode 8)
Kyle	Not published	Se Young	Sydnee	Sydnee	No; Vote	Not published	~~Sydnee~~	Sam	Jaimi	No; Vote	Eliminated (Episode 7)	
Jaimi	Not published	Sam	Lauren	Lauren	No; Vote	Not published	~~Lydia~~	Sam	Sam	Eliminated (Episode 7)		
Chris	Not published	Se Young	Lauren	Lauren	No; Vote	Not published	~~Sam~~	Sam	Eliminated (Episode 6)			
Lydia	Not published	Phil	Sydnee	Sydnee	No; Vote	Sydnee	~~Sydnee~~	Eliminated (Episode 5)				
Phil	Not published	Se Young	Lauren	Lauren	No; Vote	Sydnee	Eliminated (Episode 5)					
Phil	Not published	Se Young	Phil (Note: Phil received a vote against himself for not completing a secret task.)	Lauren	No; Vote	Sydnee	Eliminated (Episode 5)					
Lauren	Harry	Se Young	Sydnee	Sydnee	No; Vote	Eliminated (Episode 3)						
Lauren	Harry	Se Young	Sydnee	Sydnee	No; Vote	Eliminated (Episode 3)						
Lauren	Harry	Se Young	Sydnee	Sydnee	No; Vote	Eliminated (Episode 3)						
Se Young	Not published	Lauren	Eliminated (Episode 2)									
Harry	Not published	Eliminated (Episode 2)										

== Episodes ==
No. overall	No. in season	Title	Original release date
1	1	"Instant Millionaire"	March 26, 2025
2	2	"The Five Suspects"	March 26, 2025
3	3	"Going to Hell on a Scholarship"	March 26, 2025
4	4	"Hot Seat for Three"	April 2, 2025
5	5	"The Kill Shot"	April 2, 2025
6	6	"911, Misdemeanor, Handcuffs"	April 2, 2025
7	7	"The Tale of Two Sisters"	April 9, 2025
8	8	"Get Rich or Lie Trying"	April 9, 2025
