= Robert Mulcahy =

American college athletics administrator (1932–2022)

Biographical details
- Born: 1932
- Died: February 7, 2022 (age 89-90)
- Education: Villanova University

Administrative career (AD unless noted)
- 1998–2009: Rutgers University

Robert Edward Mulcahy III (1932 – February 7, 2022) was an American college athletics administrator. He served as the athletic director at Rutgers University from 1998 to 2009.

== Early life and education ==
Mulcahy attended Millburn High School in Millburn, New Jersey, and graduated from Villanova University in 1958 with a Bachelor of Arts (A.B.) in History. In college, he was a member of the Naval ROTC. He served as an officer on the USS Leyte CVS-32 and USS Tarawa CVS-40.

== Career ==
At age 23, he ran successfully for Mendham Borough council about a year after moving to the borough, defeating an incumbent Republican and becoming the lone Democrat on the council. In 1970, he was elected Mayor of the predominately Republican town and served from 1971-1974. He resigned before the end of his term after being appointed by Governor Brendan Byrne to be deputy commissioner of New Jersey Department of Institutions and Agencies. In 1976, he was then appointed by Governor Byrne to the state's first Corrections Commission. He then spent 19 years (1978–1998) as president and CEO of the New Jersey Sports and Exposition Authority. In 1989, he was a finalist for the position of Commissioner of the National Football League, but he withdrew his name from the selection process.

After arriving at Rutgers on April 15, 1998, Mulcahy used personal contacts to raise the Athletic Department's endowment and New Jersey political contacts to obtain funding from the New Jersey legislature for a massive renovation of Rutgers athletic facilities. He also won increased television coverage for Rutgers football. In 2008, a series of scandals hit the press with investigative reporting by the Newark Star-Ledger leading to disclosures concerning the handling of Athletics Department finances. Mulcahy was fired in December 2008 by then-president Richard McCormick under pressure resulting from the Star-Ledger investigations, though he said he had done nothing wrong.

Mulcahy served as the chairman of the New Jersey Casino Reinvestment Development Authority from 2014 to June 2021.

In 2012, he joined the board of trustees of Georgian Court University. He served on the board until his death.

== Awards and honors ==
Mulcahy was made a knight of the Order of St. Gregory the Great by Pope John Paul II. He received the Ellis Island Medal of Honor.

In 2017, Mulcahy was inducted into the Rutgers Athletic Hall of Fame, in recognition of his 11 years as the school's athletic director and his role in securing state funding for a major renovation of its athletic facilities.

He was inducted into the New Jersey Hall of Fame in 2020.

== Personal life ==
Mulcahy was a longtime resident of Mendham Borough; after 37 years, he and his family moved to Basking Ridge. With his wife Marie "Terry" Mulcahy, he had seven children and 15 grandchildren. Terry died on May 1, 2021, at the age of 84.

Mulcahy died on February 7, 2022.

== Books ==
An Athletic Director's Story and the Future of College Sports in America (Rutgers University Press, 2020)
