= Morris Catholic High School =

Catholic high school in Morris County, New Jersey, US

Location
- 200 Morris Avenue; Denville Township, (Morris County), New Jersey 07834; United States; 40°54′20″N 74°29′26″W

Information
- Type: Private, Coeducational
- Motto: "Scientia Caritatis Christi" ("A Knowledge of the Love of Christ")
- Religious affiliations: Roman Catholic, Sisters of Christian Charity
- Established: 1957
- Founder: Diocese of Paterson and the Sisters of Christian Charity
- School district: Diocese of Paterson
- NCES School ID: 00866159
- President: Brian Vohden
- Principal: Brian Vohden
- Chaplain: Rev. Carmen Buono
- Faculty: 40.1 FTEs
- Grades: 9–12
- Enrollment: 394 (as of 2021–22)
- Student to teacher ratio: 9.8:1
- Campus size: 33 acres (130,000 m^{2})
- Colors: Navy blue and white
- Athletics conference: Northwest Jersey Athletic Conference (general); North Jersey Super Football Conference (football)
- Team name: Crusaders
- Accreditation: Cognia
- Publication: Scope (literary magazine)
- Yearbook: The Shield
- Tuition: $17,200 (2026–27)
- Website: www.morriscatholic.org

Morris Catholic High School is a four-year comprehensive Roman Catholic regional high school located in Denville Township, in Morris County, in the U.S. state of New Jersey. The school was founded in 1957 and operates as part of the Diocese of Paterson. Morris Catholic High School has been recognized by the National Blue Ribbon Schools Program, the highest award an American school can receive.

As of the 2021–22 school year, the school had an enrollment of 394 students and 40.1 classroom teachers (on an FTE basis), for a student–teacher ratio of 9.8:1. The school's student body was 64.5% (254) White, 11.4% (45) two or more races, 10.4% (41) Hispanic, 9.4% (37) Black and 4.3% (17) Asian.

The school has been accredited by Cognia since April 2010.

== Assumption College for Sisters ==
Assumption College for Sisters is a two-year Roman Catholic women's college. Founded in 1953 through an affiliation with Seton Hall University, Assumption is run by the Sisters of Christian Charity. Primarily designed to prepare women for work in religious vocations, Assumption specializes in theological studies and the liberal arts. It is the last remaining sisters' college, or college primarily designed to educate nuns, in the United States. In 2014, the school relocated to a convent on the Morris Catholic High School campus.

== Awards, recognition and rankings ==
During the 1984–85 school year, Morris Catholic High School was awarded the National Blue Ribbon School Award of Excellence by the United States Department of Education.

During the 2012–13 school year, students from Morris Catholic drama classes won first place at the New Jersey Thespian Festival. It was the school's second win after taking the top prize for the main stage category the previous year.

== Athletics ==
The Morris Catholic High School Crusaders compete in the Northwest Jersey Athletic Conference, which is comprised of 39 public and private high schools in Morris, Sussex and Warren counties, and was established by the New Jersey State Interscholastic Athletic Association (NJSIAA) following a reorganization of sports leagues in Northern New Jersey. Prior to the NJSIAA's 2010 realignment, the school had participated in the Colonial Hills Conference which included schools in Essex, Morris and Somerset counties in west Central Jersey. With 328 students in grades 10–12, the school was classified by the NJSIAA for the 2019–20 school year as Non-Public B for most athletic competition purposes, which included schools with an enrollment of 37 to 366 students in that grade range (equivalent to Group I for public schools). The interscholastic sports that Morris Catholic offers are men's and women's soccer, football, women's volleyball, men's and women's basketball, wrestling, ice hockey, winter and spring track and field, men's and women's lacrosse, baseball, softball, fencing, and golf. The football team competes in the United Blue division of the North Jersey Super Football Conference, which includes 112 schools competing in 20 divisions, making it the nation's biggest football-only high school sports league. The school was classified by the NJSIAA as Non-Public Group B (equivalent to Group I/II for public schools) for football for 2024–2026, which included schools with 140 to 686 students.

The school participates as the host school and lead agency for joint cooperative cross country running and ice hockey teams with the Academy of Saint Elizabeth, while the Academy of St. Elizabeth is the host school for a joint field hockey team. DePaul Catholic High School is the host school for a joint skiing team. All of these co-op programs operate under agreements scheduled to expire at the end of the 2023–24 school year.

The 1971 baseball team won the Parochial B state title with a 3–0 win against Gloucester Catholic High School in the playoff finals.

The 1974 and 1975 boys' cross country team won the New Jersey Meet of Champions and finished the season ranked #1 in the state becoming the first team to win back-to-back titles. They were Parochial B champions in the five consecutive years from 1974 to 1978.

The softball team won the Non-Public A state championship in 1982 (defeating Camden Catholic High School in the finals) and won the Non-Public B title in 1986 (vs. Gloucester Catholic High School), 2021 (vs. St. Joseph Academy) and 2022 (vs. Gill St. Bernard's School). The 1982 team ended their season at 17–7 after winning the Parochial A state title with a 2–1 walk-off win against Camden Catholic in the championship game.

The girls' soccer team was Group I state champion in 1988 (defeating Metuchen High School in the final game of the playoffs), 1989 (vs. Pitman High School), 1990 (vs. Metuchen), 1991 (vs. Bordentown Regional High School), 1992 (vs. Pingry School), 1993 (vs. Pitman), 1994 (vs. Montgomery High School), 1995 (vs Pitman) and 1997 (as co-champion with Haddonfield Memorial High School), and won the Non-Public B state title in 1999 (vs. St. Rose High School), 2001 (vs. Gloucester Catholic High School), 2003 (vs. Eustace Preparatory School), 2012 (vs. St. Rose High School), 2013 (vs. St. Rose) and 2016 (vs. Holy Spirit High School). The 15 state titles won by the program are the most of any school in New Jersey. The team won its first title in 1988 with a 6–1 win against Metuchen in the finals at Trenton State College. The 1990 team finished the season 20–1–1 and won its third consecutive Group III title with a 3–0 win against Metuchen in the finals. The 1990 team won a record fourth straight title and ended the season 24–1 after a 4–0 win against Bordentown in the championship game. A 1–0 win in 1993 against Pitman in the Group I final extended the program's streak to six consecutive state championships. The 2000 girls' soccer team won the Parochial North B state sectional championship, defeating Kent Place School in the tournament final. In 2012, the girls' soccer team won the NJSIAA Non-Public B state championship with a 1–0 win against St. Rose High School to give the program their 13th state championship, the most of any team in the state. In 2013, the team captured its second consecutive NJSIAA/Sports Authority Non-Public B state championship with a 3–1 victory over St. Rose.

The girls' spring / outdoor track team won the Non-Public B state championships in 1992-1994, 1999, 2017-2020 and 2022; the program's eight group titles are tied for fourth-most in the state. In 2010, the spring track and field team won the Non-Public B North state sectional title. The girls track team won the winter / indoor track Group I state championship in 1994 and 1995, and won the Non-Public B title in 2019, 2020 and 2022. The program's five state group titles are tied for seventh-most in the state.

The boys' soccer team won the 2005 NJSIAA North Group B state championship with a 1–0 win against St. Rose High School.

In 2007, the girls' basketball team won the NJSIAA North Group A state championship with a 53–32 win against Immaculata High School. In 2014, the team "captured their 3rd NJSIAA state sectional championship in a row, their 10th since 2002" in a 58–48 win over Immaculate Conception of Lodi.

== Notable alumni ==
- Dean DeNobile (born 2003), college football quarterback for the Florida State Seminoles
- John Fassel (born 1974), special teams coach and interim head coach of the Los Angeles Rams
- Gerry Gallagher (born 1951, class of 1969), head college football coach
- Stella Johnson (born 1998), professional basketball player who played in the WNBA for the Washington Mystics
- Al Krevis (born 1952), former American football offensive tackle who played in the NFL for the New York Jets and Cincinnati Bengals
- Marisa Lago (born 1955, class of 1973), New York City government official and former Assistant Secretary of the Treasury
- Joe McHale (born 1963), former American football linebacker who played in the NFL for the New England Patriots
- Peter and Paul JJ Payack (born 1950), authors Paul JJ Payack is founder of Global Language Monitor
- Michael Pitt (born 1981), actor
- Karen Ann Quinlan (1954–1985), figure in the history of the right to die debate in United States
- Roseann Quinn (1944–1973), schoolteacher whose murder inspired Judith Rossner's 1975 novel Looking for Mr. Goodbar as well as the 1977 film adaptation directed by Richard Brooks
- Erik Storz (born 1975), American football linebacker who played in the NFL for the Jacksonville Jaguars
