= Assumption College for Sisters =

Private Roman Catholic women's college in Mendham Borough, New Jersey

Coordinates: 40.7575°N 74.6023°W

- Type: Junior Catholic women's college
- Established: 1953
- Religious affiliation: Sisters of Christian Charity
- President: Sister Joseph Spring, S.C.C.
- Undergraduates: 38
- Location: Mendham Borough, New Jersey, United States
- Campus: Rural
- Website: www.acs350.org

The Assumption College for Sisters is a private two-year Catholic women's college formerly located in Mendham Borough, New Jersey, United States. Founded in 1953 through an affiliation with nearby Seton Hall University, Assumption is run by the Sisters of Christian Charity. It is the last remaining sisters' college, or college primarily designed to educate religious sisters, in the US. Since 2014, Assumption has shared a campus with Morris Catholic High School in Denville Township, New Jersey.

== Academics ==
Since it is primarily designed to prepare women for religious vocations, Assumption specializes in theological studies and the liberal arts. Religious courses are offered in doctrine, morality, catechetics, mariology, ecclesiology, and other areas of focus. More traditional subjects such as philosophy, art, literature, history, music, chemistry, biology, calculus, psychology, and computer literacy are also offered and required. Students at Assumption can receive the Associate of Arts and/or the Associate of Religious Arts upon graduation; a certificate option in Theological Studies is also available.

The student body at Assumption consists of women who have been accepted to religious institutes, women under spiritual advisement who are considering joining religious institutes, and lay people. As of 2013, enrollment was thirty-eight.

Assumption is accredited by the Middle States Commission on Higher Education and the Commission on Higher Education of the State of New Jersey; it has been continuously accredited since 1965. It is a member of the Association of Catholic Colleges and Universities and the National Catholic College Admission Association.
