= Gun laws in Connecticut =

Location of Connecticut in the United States

Gun laws in Connecticut regulate the sale, possession, and use of firearms and ammunition in the U.S. state of Connecticut. Gun laws in Connecticut are amongst the most restrictive in the country. Connecticut requires training, background check and permitting requirements for the purchase of firearms and ammunition; and a ban (with exceptions) on certain semi-automatic firearms defined as assault weapons and magazines that can hold more than 10 rounds. Connecticut's licensing system for concealed carry is relatively permissive.

== Summary table ==
Subject / law	Long guns	Handguns	Relevant statutes	Notes
State permit required to purchase?	Yes	Yes	CGS 29–33(b), CGS 29–36(f), CGS 29-38m(c)	Certificate of Eligibility for Pistol and Revolvers, or Long Guns, or Ammunition required to purchase handguns, long guns, or ammunition, respectively, or a State Permit to Carry Pistols and Revolvers to purchase any of the above. Applicants must complete an approved safety course, and pass a National Instant Criminal Background Check System (NICS) background check and mental health records check prior to issuance of certificate. Certificates of Eligibility are granted on a May-Issue basis to qualified applicants and are valid for five years. With the passing of Public Act 13-3, hunting licenses (which take approximately 12 hours to complete versus the eight hours the NRA Basic Pistol Course takes) may no longer be used to purchase ammunition or long rifles. Long guns and ammunition purchased outside of Connecticut are not subject to the long gun and ammunition eligibility requirements (even if one is a Conn. resident) other than the two-week waiting period must be observed for long gun transfers out of state, unless one has a valid hunting license or carry permit.
Firearm registration?	Partial	Partial	CGS 53–202	Registration required for assault weapons purchased between September 13, 1994 and April 1, 2014 and for machine guns obtained before January 1, 2014. There is a de facto registry of the sale (including the serial numbers) of handguns and long guns purchased in the state that is maintained by the Department of Emergency Services and Public Protection (DESPP). Any transfer, be it from a dealer or private party, must be accompanied by an authorization number issued by the DESPP and a form containing personal and weapon identification (DPS-3-C) must be submitted to DESPP and local police. This form is collected and maintained on all guns purchased from FFL dealers as well. The DPS-3-C form is not required for long gun transfers made out of state, and there is no legal requirement/penalty to register firearms purchased out of state or lawfully obtained before April 1, 2014.
Assault weapons law?	Yes	Yes	CGS 53–202	Selective fire weapons, numerous specifically named firearms, some .50 BMG variant firearms, and semiautomatic center-fire firearms with one defining cosmetic feature are banned; banned weapons lawfully possessed prior to April 4, 2013, must have been registered with DESPP prior to January 1, 2014. Registered weapons may only be sold or transferred to a licensed gun dealer, to the State Police or local police department, transferred to a recipient outside of Connecticut or willed to a designated heir when the original owner/registrant becomes deceased. Assault weapons that are not specifically named on the state's assault weapons ban and were manufactured and lawfully obtained prior to September 13, 1994 do not require registration with DESPP and may be sold or transferred to any non-prohibited person provided that they are at least 21 years old. Exceptions exist for active and retired law enforcement and military members.
Magazine capacity restriction?	Yes	Yes	53-202w	As of April 4, 2013, magazines holding more than 10 rounds are considered Large Capacity Magazines (LCM), and such magazines manufactured after that date may not be sold or transferred within the state. Existing owners of LCMs may possess such magazines if they declare and register them with the DESPP before January 1, 2014; Owners of registered LCMs may not load such magazines with more than 10 rounds except when inside the owner's home or on the premises of a licensed shooting range. Even if an individual has a permit to carry a pistol or revolver, they can never carry, other than at a shooting range, a pistol that has an LCM loaded with more than 10 bullets. Possessing an unregistered Large Capacity Magazine obtained prior to the ban's effective date is an infraction with a $90 fine for the first offense, and a Class D felony (punishable by up to 5 years in prison and/or a $5,000 fine) for subsequent offenses. Unlawfully possessing a LCM obtained after the effective date of the ban is a Class D felony.
Owner license required?	No	No	None	
Permit required for concealed carry?	N/A	Yes	CGS 29–28	Shall-Issue, with Limited Discretion. Connecticut's pistol permit law specifies that issuing authorities May-Issue pistol permits to qualified applicants, but the state's courts have generally ruled that permits must be granted on a Shall-Issue basis to applicants meeting the state's qualifications for a pistol permit, as Connecticut does not require an applicant to "show good cause" for needing a permit. Issuing local authorities have limited discretion to deny a permit when he or she has personal knowledge of the applicant's character that would not otherwise be reflected on a background check. Denial on this basis would have to be justified with supporting evidence showing that the applicant is not of "suitable" character to be granted a pistol permit, but virtually all cases are thrown out if the applicant is not otherwise barred from owning firearms. Connecticut has a two-step permitting process: a 60-day Temporary permit issued by local authorities and a 5-year Regular permit issued by the Department of Emergency Services and Public Protection (DESPP). Issuance of a Temporary permit is technically not a prerequisite to apply for a Regular permit, but in practice an applicant must await a decision from local authorities on the temporary permit application before applying to DESPP for the Regular permit. If the local permit is denied for any reason, instead one files an appeal to DESPP to have the state board re-examine the application. If the state board denies the permit (rare occurrence), a court appeal is possible. Permit needed to carry open or concealed. Exceptions for peace officers and Active-Duty military members. Out of state permits not valid in Connecticut, but non-residents may apply for a Connecticut non-resident carry permit through the mail. Non-residents must have a carry permit issued by a United States jurisdiction to apply.
Permit required for open carry?	Illegal	Illegal		Effective October 1, 2023, the open carry of handguns and long guns is generally prohibited in Connecticut, except on property owned or lawfully controlled by the person carrying openly, at a designated shooting range, or while hunting.
Vehicle carry permitted?	No	Yes		A valid Connecticut pistol permit is required to carry a loaded weapon in a vehicle. Otherwise, the weapon must be unloaded and the firearm and its ammunition must be stored in locked containers during transport. As of October 1, 2019, handguns left in unattended vehicles are required to be stored in the trunk, locked safe, or locked glove box.
Duty to inform?	No	No		Connecticut is not a duty to inform state. Those who are carrying a pistol or revolver must carry their permit with them.
Castle Doctrine?	Yes	Yes	sec_53a-20	A person in possession or control of premises, or a person who is licensed or privileged to be in or upon such premises, is justified in using reasonable physical force upon another person when and to the extent that he reasonably believes such to be necessary to prevent or terminate the commission or attempted commission of a criminal trespass by such other person in or upon such premises; but he may use deadly physical force under such circumstances only (1) in defense of a person as prescribed in section 53a-19, or (2) when he reasonably believes such to be necessary to prevent an attempt by the trespasser to commit arson or any crime of violence, or (3) to the extent that he reasonably believes such to be necessary to prevent or terminate an unlawful entry by force into his dwelling as defined in section 53a-100, or place of work, and for the sole purpose of such prevention or termination.
State preemption of local restrictions?	Partial	Yes	CGS 29–28	State pre-emption of local ordinances not explicitly specified in state law, but established by court precedence. Most municipalities have ordinances restricting or banning the discharge of firearms outside of firing ranges or designated hunting areas during hunting seasons. Some municipalities have restrictions or bans on carrying long guns in public places. The City of New London and the City of New Britain previously had ordinances that forbade concealed carry of handguns, which have since been repealed in both cities. Some localities have zoning ordinances restricting or banning gun stores and/or shooting ranges within their boundaries.
NFA weapons restricted?	No	No	CGS 53–202(c)	SBR, SBS, DD, suppressors are legal, provided they also comply with the assault weapons provisions, unless purchased before October 1, 1993. Machine guns are legal if purchased and registered with the state before January 1, 2014. Non-selective fire machine guns may be transferred to another resident within Connecticut.
Peaceable Journey laws?	No	No	CGS 29–38(d)	Federal rules observed.
Background checks required for private sales?	Yes	Yes	CGS 29-36l	Private party firearm transfers require that a NICS background check of the buyer be performed by the Department of Emergency Services and Public Protection – Special Licensing and Firearms Unit. This can be accomplished by the seller through a phone call to DESPP-SLFU.
Red flag law?	Yes	Yes		State law allows police, after investigating and determining probable cause, to get a court warrant and seize guns from anyone "posing an imminent risk of harming themselves or someone else".

== State constitutional provisions ==
Article I, Section 15 of the Constitution of Connecticut states:

"Every citizen has a right to bear arms in defense of himself and the state."

== Permitting system ==
Connecticut issues a Permit to Carry Pistols and Revolvers to both residents and non-residents, which allows concealed carry by the permit-holder. By law, Connecticut is a May-Issue state based on an applicant's suitability to be granted a pistol permit, but court precedence has established that issuing authorities must grant permits on a Shall-Issue basis for the vast majority of applicants who meet the state's statutory qualifications. State statutes specify that the issuing authority must determine the applicant is a "suitable person" before approving the application for a pistol permit, although no such definition exists in state law. However, the state's courts have established that a "suitable person" is one who generally meets all of the statutory criteria to qualify for a state pistol permit. Additionally, unlike other May-Issue states, Connecticut law does not require the applicant to provide a "necessary and proper reason" (or in other words, show "good cause") for needing a pistol permit. As such, the state courts have generally ruled that issuing authorities cannot deny an applicant a pistol permit either arbitrarily or for reasons that are unrelated to the applicant's qualifications for obtaining such a permit. This interpretation by the courts does afford the issuing authority some degree of discretion when he or she has personal knowledge of the applicant's character that may not be reflected in any official background check, although a denial on this basis would have to be strongly justified with substantiating evidence by the issuing authority. As of the end of 2012, there were 179,092 active pistol permits in Connecticut. The number of active pistol permits has increased to more than 250,000 as of early 2016, compared to a total population of 3.5 million. Of the more than 12,000 pistol permit applications received and processed by the Connecticut Department of Emergency Services and Public Protection (DESPP) in 2011, only 23 applicants were denied a pistol permit. Despite this, the application process for a Connecticut pistol permit can be quite lengthy depending on town, with some applicants reporting that the entire process for obtaining a pistol permit taking more than a year from the time the initial application is filed with the local issuing authority to when the Regular 5-year permit is issued by the DESPP.

Connecticut has a two-step permitting process: a 60-day Temporary permit issued by the local police chief, and a Regular 5-year permit issued by the Department of Public Safety Special Licensing and Firearms Unit (SLFU). The Temporary permit, issued by local authorities on a May-Issue basis, is a vestige of the pre-1965 pistol permitting system, when Connecticut permits were issued entirely by local authorities. The rewriting of the Connecticut State Constitution in 1965 intended to consolidate authority to issue pistol permits with the Department of Emergency Services and Public Protection (DESPP) and require permits to be issued on a Shall-Issue basis, but the transition to the uniform statewide permitting system was never fully completed, resulting in the two-step permitting system in Connecticut today. The initial step of obtaining a Temporary permit from local authorities only applies to an initial permit application; those renewing an expiring permit submit a renewal application directly to the DESPP.

Those desiring a pistol permit in Connecticut must first apply for a temporary permit (valid for 60 days from the date of issuance) from the local police department, or in some locations the town clerk's office, which conducts the background checks and fingerprinting. Temporary permits are issued on a May-Issue basis, and each town is different in its willingness to approve permits; some towns create their own requirements that go well beyond the State requirements (although state law does not require the applicant to fulfill any locally defined requirements to qualify for a pistol permit). It is typically much more difficult to obtain temporary pistol permits in larger cities, such as Bridgeport, Hartford, and New Haven. Other towns will automatically issue a permit as long as the individual does not meet any statutory criteria that would disqualify him or her from holding such a permit. State law technically does not require an applicant for a Temporary permit to be a resident of the town in which the application is filed. In practice, local issuing authorities will generally not accept permit applications from non-residents, although some towns will accept applications from non-residents who have a bona-fide place of business within such jurisdictions. While the town has 8 weeks per state law to approve the temporary permit, it may be several months before the local issuing authority makes a decision on a pistol permit application. If the temporary permit is granted, the applicant must apply to the SLFU for a regular pistol permit (valid for 5 years), which will generally grant the permit unless there is reason specified by law the individual should be denied. These include:

- Criminal possession of a narcotic substance;
- Criminally negligent homicide;
- Assault in the third degree;
- Reckless endangerment in the first degree;
- Unlawful restraint in the second degree;
- Riot in the first degree;
- Stalking in the second degree;
- Conviction as a delinquent for the commission of a serious juvenile offense;
- Discharge from custody within the preceding twenty (20) years after having been found not guilty of a crime by reason of mental disease or defect;
- Restraining or protective order issued by a court in a case involving the use, attempted use or threatened use of physical force against another person;
- Firearms seizure order issued for posing a risk of personal injury to self or others after a hearing; or
- The individual is explicitly prohibited from possessing a firearm for having been adjudicated as mentally incompetent under federal law.

When a temporary permit application is denied, the issuing authority must provide a detailed written explanation to the applicant as to why the application was denied. An applicant who is denied a temporary pistol permit from local authorities may appeal to the state Board of Firearms Permit Examiners (BFPE), which will generally grant the appeal and issue a Regular 5-year pistol permit, provided the applicant does not meet the statutory criteria prohibiting him or her from holding such permit. Applicants may appeal an unfavorable ruling by the BFPE through the state courts.

Connecticut residents are issued a "permit to carry pistols and revolvers", which permits concealed carry, and are valid statewide.

Connecticut also has a provision in the statute that if a carry permit holder loses a firearm and does not report it, they may lose the permit.

=== Post-Sandy Hook gun control legislation ===
On April 1, 2013, Connecticut lawmakers announced a deal on what they called some of the "toughest gun laws in the country." In retrospect however, Connecticut's gun laws still remain more permissive than in California, Hawaii, Maryland, Massachusetts, New York, and New Jersey (especially with respect to open and concealed carry), even after new gun control legislation following the Sandy Hook Elementary School shooting went into effect. This new legislation included a ban on new high-capacity ammunition magazines, although magazines lawfully owned prior to the ban may be kept. The proposal also called for background checks for private gun sales and a new registry for existing magazines that carry more than 10 rounds of ammunition. The package also creates what state lawmakers said is the nation's first statewide dangerous weapon offender registry, immediate universal background checks for all firearms sales and expansion of Connecticut's assault weapons ban. On April 3 the State Senate, followed shortly thereafter at midnight, April 4, the State House approved a bipartisan gun control legislation that would be "the toughest in the United States". It was signed into law by Governor Dannel Malloy on April 4. The law makes Connecticut the first state to establish a registry for people convicted of crimes involving dangerous weapons. It also requires background checks for all gun sales, restricts semiautomatic rifles, and limits the capacity of ammunition magazines.

One proposed provision that ultimately did not make it into the final bill would have eliminated the state-level board for approving pistol permit applications and reverted the sole authority for approving or denying pistol permits back to local officials, who would then have wide latitude in adjudicating permit applications by requiring the applicant to show "good cause" for needing a pistol permit. This proposal would have mirrored California's May-Issue permitting system, where the ability for one to obtain a pistol permit would vary widely from town-to-town, although permits would be valid statewide. A subsequent compromise included in the law adds a mental health expert to the Board of Firearms Permit Examiners and establishes a process for local authorities to challenge the appeal of any applications denied at the local level.

== Reciprocity ==
Connecticut does not recognize pistol permits from any other state, but residents of other states who hold a concealed weapons permit may apply to the Department of Emergency Services and Public Protection for a non-resident Connecticut permit through the mail. Nonresident pistol permits are generally granted on a Shall-Issue basis, provided the applicant meets Connecticut's statutory requirements and completes a weapons safety course that satisfies the state's training requirement.

== Assault weapons ==
Connecticut has bans on defined 'assault weapons', which includes selective fire firearms unless purchased before October 1, 1993, and a limited list of semiautomatic AR, AK, and SKS variants. Magazines holding more than 10 rounds are considered Large Capacity Magazines and are prohibited, with grandfathering for those possessed prior to April 4, 2013, provided they are registered with DESPP by January 1, 2014. On April 4, 2013, Governor Malloy signed a comprehensive gun control bill that expands the scope of the assault weapon ban by reducing the number of defined features from two to one, while adding 100 specific firearms to the existing assault weapons ban list. Such weapons that were lawfully owned prior to the enactment of the law are grandfathered, but must be registered with the DESPP. Exceptions to the ban also exist for law enforcement and military members, but these weapons too must be registered.

The transfer of registered assault weapons is generally not permitted, except in cases where the original owner becomes deceased; in which case the weapon may be transferred through inheritance to a designated heir. Additionally, registered assault weapons may be transferred to the State Police or local police department, a licensed firearms dealer, or to a recipient outside of Connecticut (assuming that federal law and the laws of the state in which the recipient is located are followed).

Connecticut allows all NFA firearms other than selective fire machine guns; however, guns of this type that existed in Connecticut before the ban are grandfathered. Selective fire means that a machine gun can fire semi or fully automatic. Machine guns that can only fire fully automatic are legal in Connecticut if they were possessed prior to April 4, 2013, and registered on or before January 1, 2014.

Firearms that meet Connecticut's assault weapon criteria that were manufactured and lawfully acquired prior to September 13, 1994, are no longer required to be registered with the DESPP and may be sold or transferred to any person who is not prohibited from owning firearms under state or federal law.

Persons moving into Connecticut with assault weapons (manufactured after September 13, 1994) must—within 90 days of arrival in the state—either surrender the weapons to the State Police or local police, transfer them to a licensed gun dealer or otherwise sell or transfer the weapons to a recipient outside of Connecticut. Such weapons may also be modified to eliminate "assault weapon" features as long as the receiver is not included on the list of specific makes and models banned by the assault weapons law.

In August 2025 the Second Circuit upheld the denial of a preliminary injunction against the rifle and magazine restrictions in National Association for Gun Rights v. Lamont and Grant v. Rovella. The court assumed for its decision that the rifles and magazines are in common use and concluded that the challengers were unlikely to succeed. It found that the laws are "targeted restrictions on unusually dangerous weapons" that are consistent with the nation's historical tradition of regulating such weapons. On June 30, 2026 the Supreme Court granted review in the Grant case, now captioned Grant v. Higgins, and consolidated it with Viramontes v. Cook County, a challenge to Cook County's ban, for one hour of oral argument.

== Seizure of weapons ==
Connecticut statutes allows police, after investigating and determining probable cause, to get a court warrant and seize guns from anyone posing an imminent risk of harming themselves or someone else. A judge must hold a hearing within 14 days after the seizure and order the police to hold the guns for up to one year or return them. The judge (1) must, when assessing probable cause, consider recent acts of violence, threatening, or animal cruelty and (2) may, when assessing imminent risk, consider such factors as reckless gun use or display, violent threats, alcohol abuse, illegal drug use, and prior involuntary psychiatric confinement. Connecticut's weapons seizure law does not require the individual to be compensated by authorities when weapons are permanently confiscated, as the seizure action falls within the purview of an "enforcement action", (and thus a civil forfeiture) rather than a "seizure of property for public benefit", thereby making the seizure outside of the scope of the Takings Clause of the Fifth Amendment of the United States Constitution requiring just compensation for property taken. Currently, only three other states (California, New York and Indiana) have weapons seizure laws similar to Connecticut's.

== Other laws ==
Connecticut law requires gun show organizers to obtain a Gun Show Permit from local authorities prior to the start of the event. Gun Show Permits are issued by the Police Chief (or Town Clerk in some locations) on a May-Issue basis.

In 2014, the Connecticut Supreme Court ruled that dirk knives and police batons are protected by the Second Amendment.

As of October 1, 2019, all manufactured guns will be required to have a serial number obtained from the Department of Emergency Services and Public Protection engraved. Plastic, undetectable guns are also banned.

As of October 1, 2019, all firearms are required to be stored securely if accessible by a minor (under 18), a resident who is ineligible to possess a firearm, or someone who poses a risk. Prior, the law only required loaded firearms to be stored securely and defined minor as anyone under 16.

== State preemption of local laws ==
State laws do not explicitly preempt local ordinances, but courts have found intent of preemption in regards to firearm sales, hunting and carrying (openly or concealed) with a state-issued permit. Most municipalities have enacted ordinances to restrict or ban the discharge of firearms within their jurisdictions.

== See also ==
- An Act Concerning Gun Violence Prevention and Children's Safety
