= Sisters' college =

Type of college

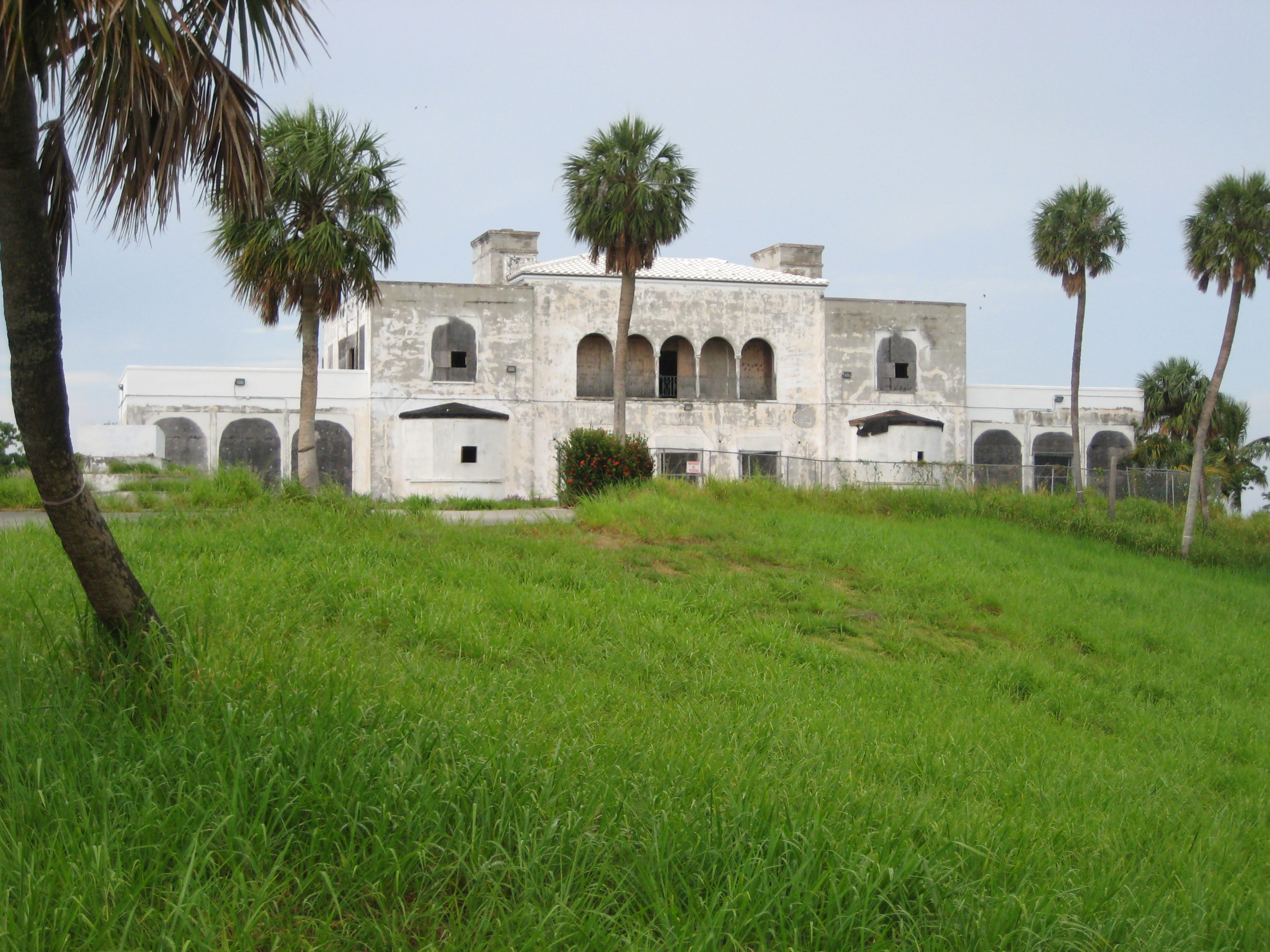
Tuckahoe, the novitiate campus of Saint Joseph College of Florida from 1950 to 1972

A sisters' college is a college that primarily serves as a place for the education of future and current sisters and nuns. They are not to be confused with Catholic women's colleges, which are designed for general education programs and do not consider the education of nuns to be their focus.

Also known as "sister formation colleges," sisters' colleges are operated by congregations of religious women, such as the Sisters of Christian Charity or the Apostles of the Sacred Heart of Jesus. Catholic Sisters' College was founded and operated by The Catholic University of America located in Washington, D.C. Historically, they have made at least some of their courses open to lay women, and also men in some cases. Most feature a convent on their premises.

Although previously prevalent across the United States, there is only one currently in operation there, that being the Assumption College for Sisters in Mendham, New Jersey. Catholic women's colleges now serve as the primary providers of education to nuns in the United States, while many of the former sisters' colleges provide campuses for convents and other religious institutions, or have been transitioned into K-12 schools.

== List of sisters' colleges ==
The following is a list of current and historical sisters' colleges. Ones listed in bold are still in operation:

=== Connecticut ===
- Diocesan Sisters College, Bloomfield (closed in 1969)
- Mount Sacred Heart College, Hamden (closed in 1997)

=== Florida ===
- Saint Joseph College of Florida, Jensen Beach (began admitting lay students in 1967; closed in 1972)

=== Massachusetts ===
- College of Saint Joseph, Boston (closed, date unknown)

=== Missouri ===
- Marillac College, St. Louis (closed in 1974)

=== Nebraska ===
- Servite College, Omaha (closed c. 1990s)

=== New Jersey ===
- **Assumption College for Sisters**, Mendham (still sisters' college)
- Englewood Cliffs College, Englewood Cliffs (closed in 1974)
- **Felician College**, Lodi - Opened in 1923; accepted lay students in 1964.

=== New York ===
- Catherine McAuley College, Rochester (closed in 1971)
- **Trocaire College**, Buffalo (began admitting lay women in 1965)

=== Pennsylvania ===
- **La Roche College**, Pittsburgh - Opened in 1963 as a sisters' college; accepted lay students in 1965.

=== Utah ===
- College of Saint Mary-of-the-Wasatch, Salt Lake City (closed in 1969)

=== Wisconsin ===
- Holy Family College, Manitowoc (began admitting lay women in 1957) - closed in 2020
- **Viterbo University**, La Crosse (began admitting lay women in 1934)

== See also ==
- List of current and historical women's universities and colleges
- Women's colleges in the United States
