= Mount Elizabeth Archeological Site =

- U.S. National Register of Historic Places
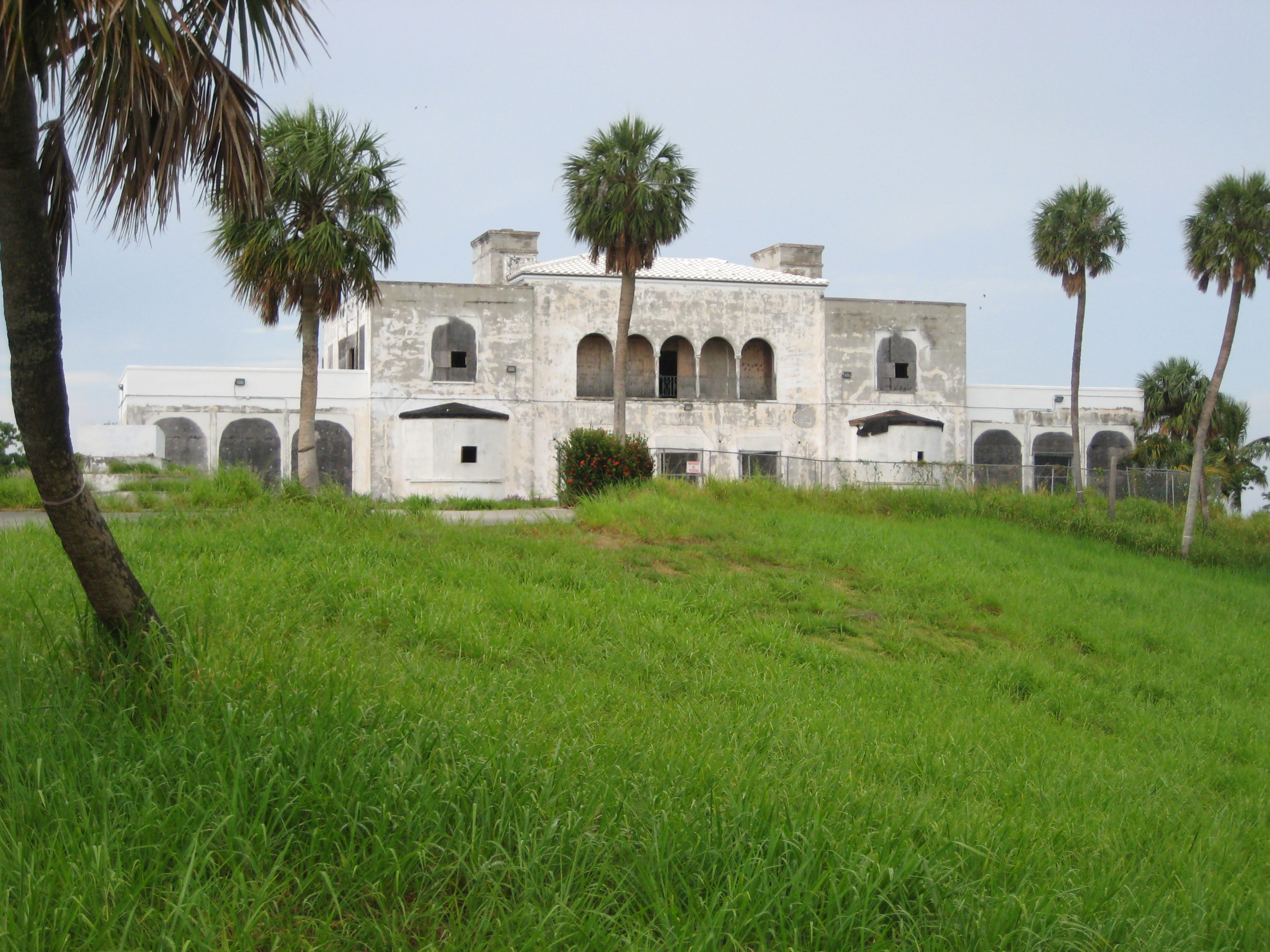
- Front view of Tuckahoe atop Mount Elizabeth

- Location within Florida Location within the United States
- Location: 1921 N.E. Indian River Drive, Jensen Beach, Florida
- Coordinates: 27°13′41″N 80°12′59″W
- Area: 39? acres
- Built: unknown
- NRHP reference No.: 02001011
- Added to NRHP: September 14, 2002

The Mount Elizabeth Archeological Site, also known as Racey's Tuckahoe, St. Joseph's Novitiate or the Mount Elizabeth Indian Mound is a prehistoric midden and an archaeological site in Jensen Beach, Florida. It is located in Martin County's Indian RiverSide Park, which includes the former Florida Institute of Technology (Jensen Beach Campus) east of Indian River Drive on the Indian River Lagoon. On September 14, 2002, it was added to the National Register of Historic Places.

== National Register listing ==
- Mount Elizabeth Archeological Site
- (added 2002 - Site - #02001011)
- Also known as Races (Racey's) Tuckahoe; St. Joseph's Novitiate
- 1707 NE Indian River Dr., Jensen Beach
- Historic Significance: Information Potential
- Area of Significance: Prehistoric
- Cultural Affiliation: Late Archaic, Orange III Period, East Okeechobee Cultural Area
- Period of Significance: 2000-2499 BC, 1500-1999 BC, 1000-1499 BC, 500-999 BC, 499-0 BC, 499-0 AD, 1000-500 AD
- Owner: Local Gov't
- Historic Function: Domestic, Religion
- Historic Sub-function: Religious Structure, Village Site
- Current Function: Landscape
- Current Sub-function: Park

== See also ==
- Tuckahoe (Florida)
- Saint Joseph College of Florida
- National Register of Historic Places listings in Florida
