= Mendham Borough, New Jersey =

Borough in Morris County, New Jersey, US

- Borough
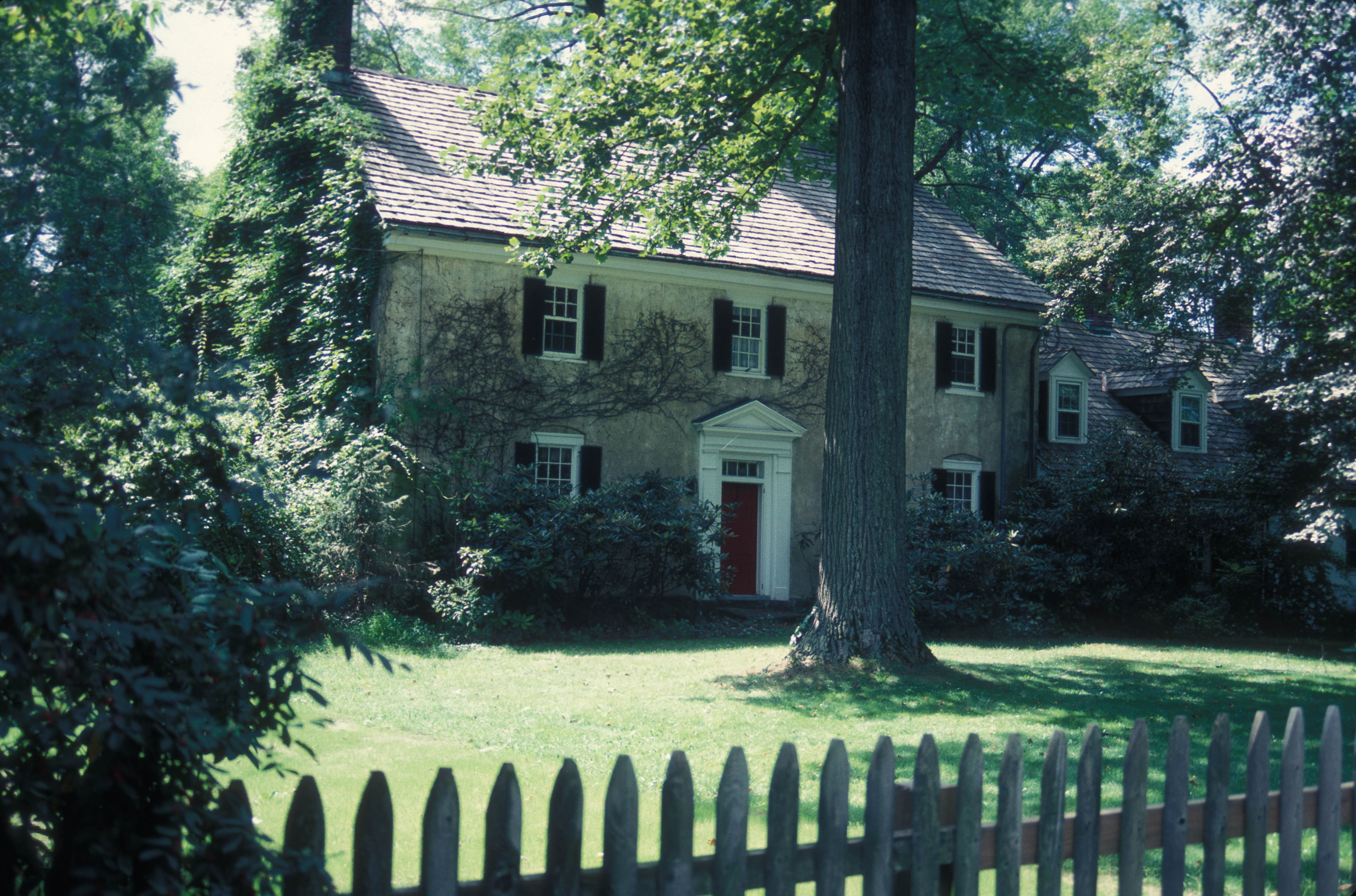
- Historic Thompson House c. 1970

- Seal

- Location of Mendham Borough in Morris County highlighted in red (right). Inset map: Location of Morris County in New Jersey highlighted in orange (left).

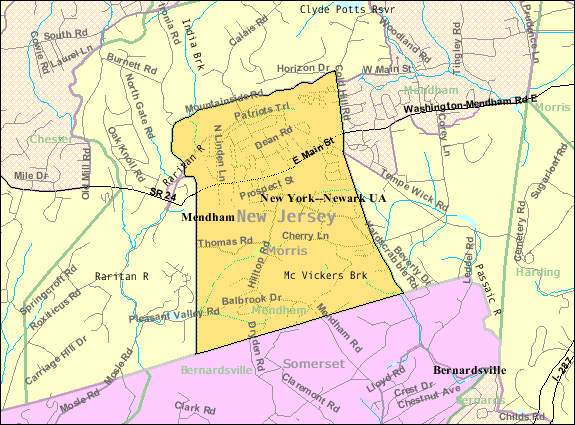
- Census Bureau map of Mendham Borough, New Jersey

- Location in Morris County Location in New Jersey Location in the United States
- Coordinates: 40.76729°N 74.597766°W
- Country: United States
- State: New Jersey
- County: Morris
- Incorporated: May 15, 1906

Government
  - Type: Borough
  - Body: Borough Council
  - Mayor: James R. Kelly (R, term ending December 31, 2026)
  - Administrator: Joyce Bushman
  - Municipal clerk: Lauren McBride (acting)

Area
  - Total: 5.98 sq mi (15.49 km^{2})
  - Land: 5.93 sq mi (15.36 km^{2})
  - Water: 0.050 sq mi (0.13 km^{2}) 0.84%
  - Rank: 257th of 565 in state 23rd of 39 in county
- Elevation: 522 ft (159 m)

Population (2020)
  - Total: 4,981
  - Estimate (2023): 4,970
  - Rank: 375th of 565 in state 31st of 39 in county
  - Density: 839.9/sq mi (324.3/km^{2})
  - Rank: 403rd of 565 in state 30th of 39 in county

Economics
  - Median income: $212,550 (±36,738) (2022)
- Time zone: UTC−05:00 (Eastern (EST))
  - Summer (DST): UTC−04:00 (Eastern (EDT))
- ZIP Code: 07945
- Area code: 908 and 973
- FIPS code: 34-45330
- GNIS feature ID: 0885296
- Website: www.mendhamnj.org

Mendham Borough is a borough in southwestern Morris County, in the U.S. state of New Jersey. As of the 2020 United States census, the borough's population was 4,981, unchanged from the 2010 census, which in turn reflected a decline of 116 (−2.3%) from the 5,097 counted in the 2000 census. Located in the Raritan Valley region within the New York metropolitan area, the North Branch of the Raritan River begins in Mendham Borough and flows in a southwest direction towards neighboring Somerset County.

Located on the northern end of the Somerset Hills region, the borough is known for its country homes and historic downtown.

The Mendham Historic District was listed on the National Register of Historic Places and the state register in 1985. Notable landmarks in the district include the Phoenix House, which serves as the borough's municipal building, along with the Black Horse Inn Tavern & Pub; New Jersey’s oldest continually operating restaurant, dating back to 1742.

New Jersey Monthly magazine ranked Mendham Borough as the number one place to live in the state in its 2013 rankings of the "Best Places to Live" in New Jersey.

In the Forbes magazine's 2006 (209th; median sale price of $835,000) and 2012 (356th; $800,672) rankings of the Most Expensive ZIP Codes in the United States, Mendham was listed among the top 500 nationwide. In 2018, New Jersey Business Magazine listed Mendham at 41st in its listing of "The Most Expensive ZIP Codes in New Jersey", with a median sale price 2017 of $650,000.

Along with Mendham Township, the Mendhams have been described by The New York Times as "both affluent". The borough is one of the state's highest-income communities. Based on data from the American Community Survey (ACS) for 2014–2018, Mendham Borough residents had a median household income of $158,542, almost double the statewide median of $79,363.

== History ==
Mendham Borough was incorporated by an act of the New Jersey Legislature on May 15, 1906, from portions of Mendham Township, because residents of what became the borough wanted sidewalks and street lights constructed while those that lived in what remained the township (including the communities of Brookside and Ralston) felt it was cost prohibitive in their more rural areas.

The formation of Mendham Borough from Mendham Township in 1906 began a series of new municipalities that were created in the Somerset Hills region.

Located on the borough's southern slope of Bernardsville Mountain in the Somerset Hills lies Wendover, the former estate of investment banker Walter Phelps Bliss (1870-1924). One of the largest mansions in the Mendhams, Wendover is now home to the Roxiticus Golf Club.

Phoenix House was purchased by Arthur Whitney of Mendham Township in 1919 and deeded to the borough in 1938 for use as its municipal building.

=== Name ===
The Mendhams may be named for Mendham, Suffolk, England, or the name may derive from the Native American word mendom (meaning "raspberry") or for an Earl of Mendham.

=== Historic district ===
- Mendham Historic District
- U.S. National Register of Historic Places
- U.S. Historic district
- New Jersey Register of Historic Places
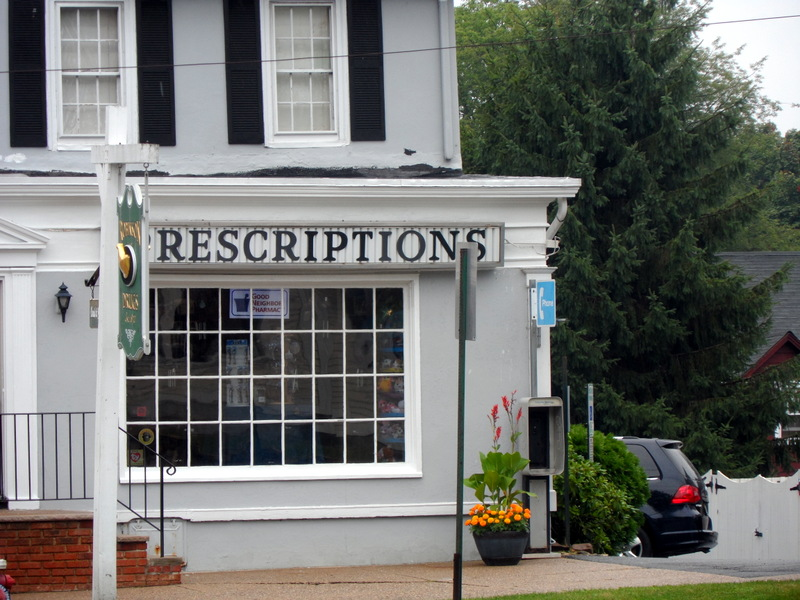
- Location: Roughly bounded by Halstead Street and Country Lane on West / East Main Street, Mountain Avenue, Hilltop Road and Prospect Street
- Area: 153 acres (62 ha)
- Architectural style: Bungalow/Craftsman, Late Victorian, Federal
- NRHP reference No.: 85000865 (original); 14000932 (increase)
- NJRHP No.: 2146

Significant dates
- Added to NRHP: April 18, 1985
- Boundary increase: November 19, 2014
- Designated NJRHP: February 5, 1985

The Mendham Historic District is a 153-acre (62 ha) historic district located along stretches of Route 24, known in Mendham as Main Street. This east-west roadway is well over 200 years old, and has been called the Washington Turnpike, the Mendham-Morristown Road, and the William Penn Highway at various times in its history. The district was added to the National Register of Historic Places on April 18, 1985, for its significance in agriculture, commerce, architecture, settlement, and religion from 1750 to 1924. The district includes 140 contributing buildings. Since 1999, Mendham Borough has had a Historic Preservation Ordinance designed and intended to enhance and preserve the district's historic character.

According to the National Park Service:

The Mendham Historic District consists of 140 properties, generally well preserved, that illustrate the history of the village from its eighteenth century founding through its 1906 incorporation as a borough, and into the first third of this century when infill building completed development within the historic bounds of the village. The District covers the central crossroads of the village, and extends as far as the area nineteenth century maps illustrate as "Mendham, P.O.", the village core containing the post office. The conjunction of religious, residential, and commercial buildings that have established Mendham's village character are well preserved today.

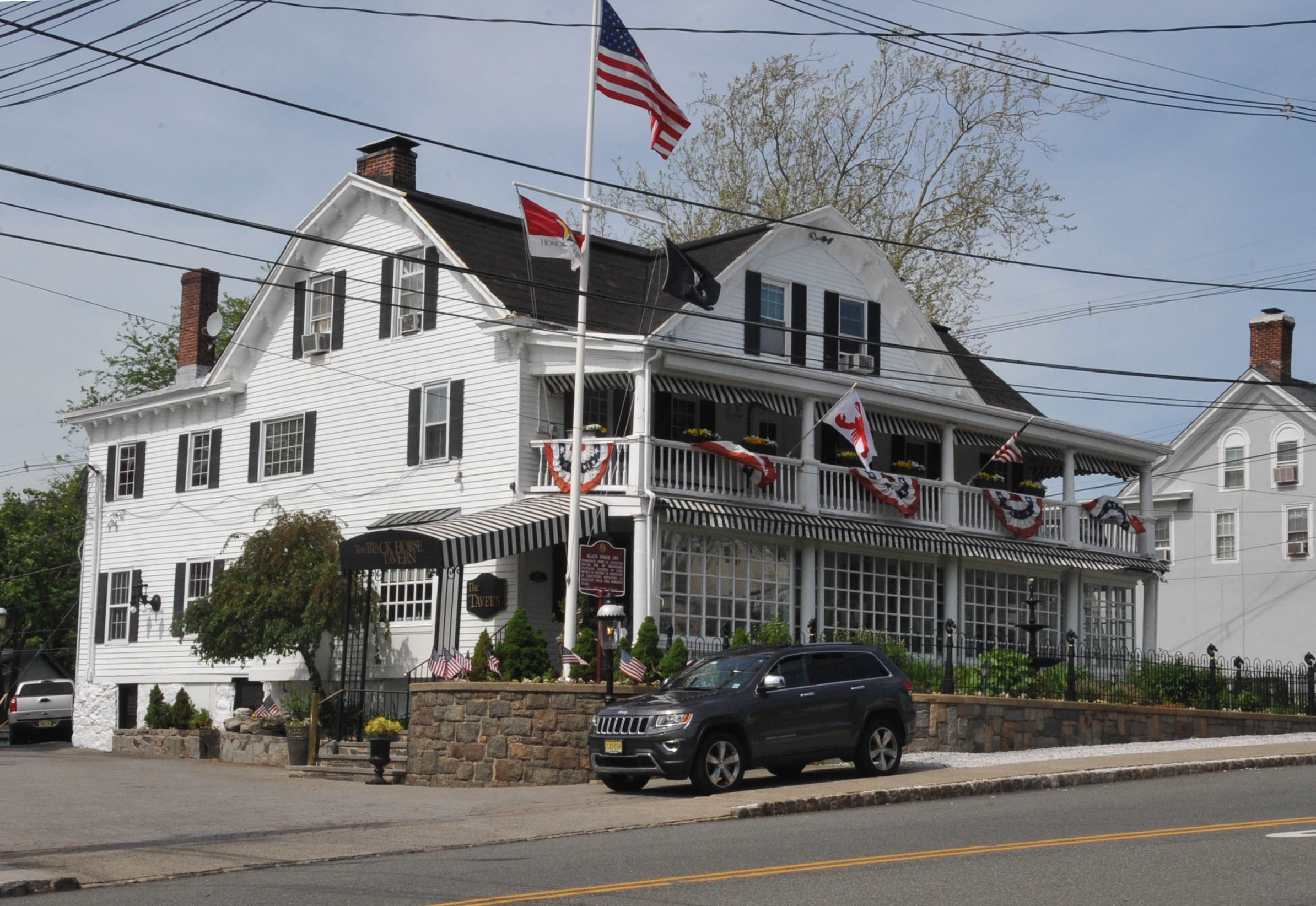
The Black Horse Tavern & Pub

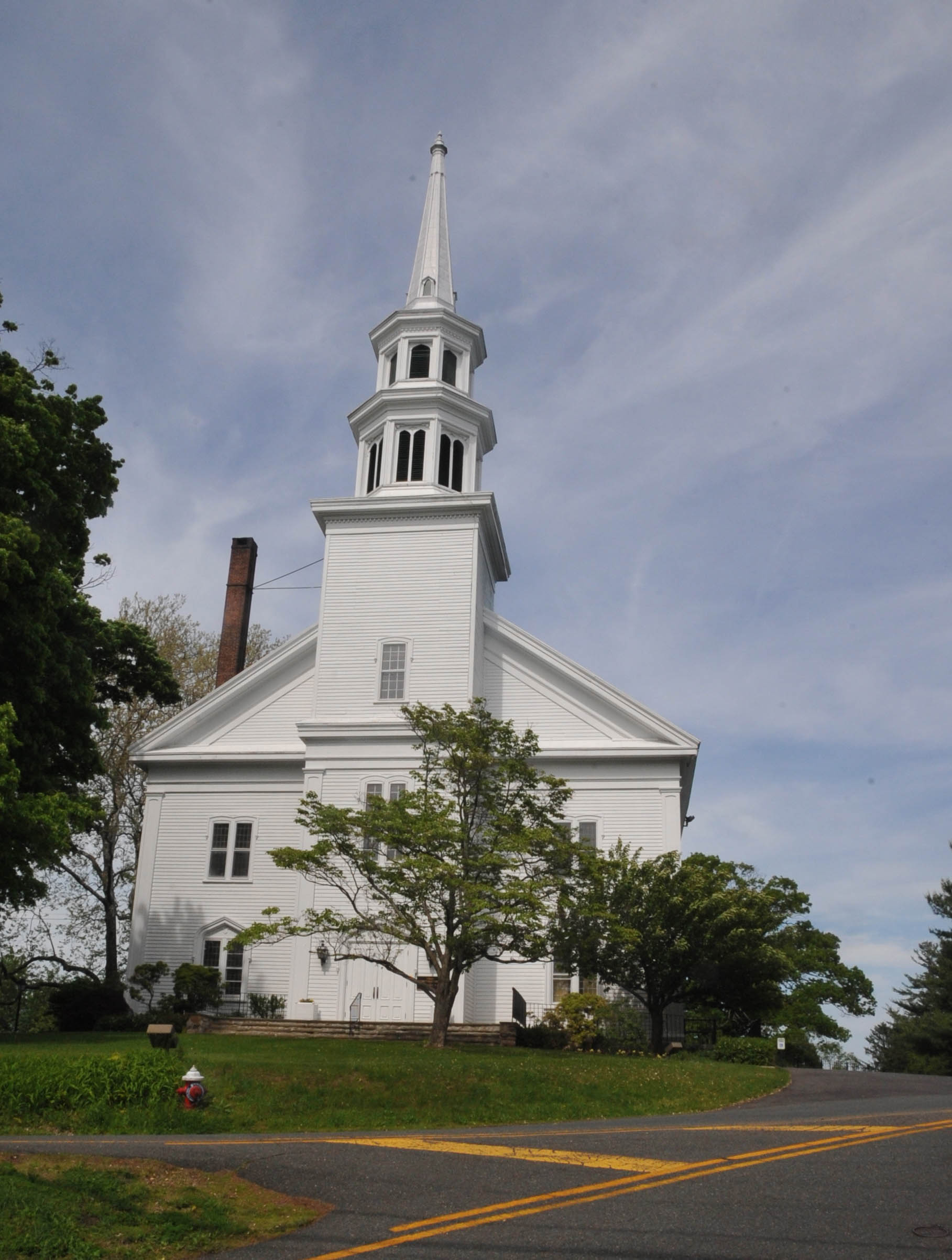
Hilltop Presbyterian Church

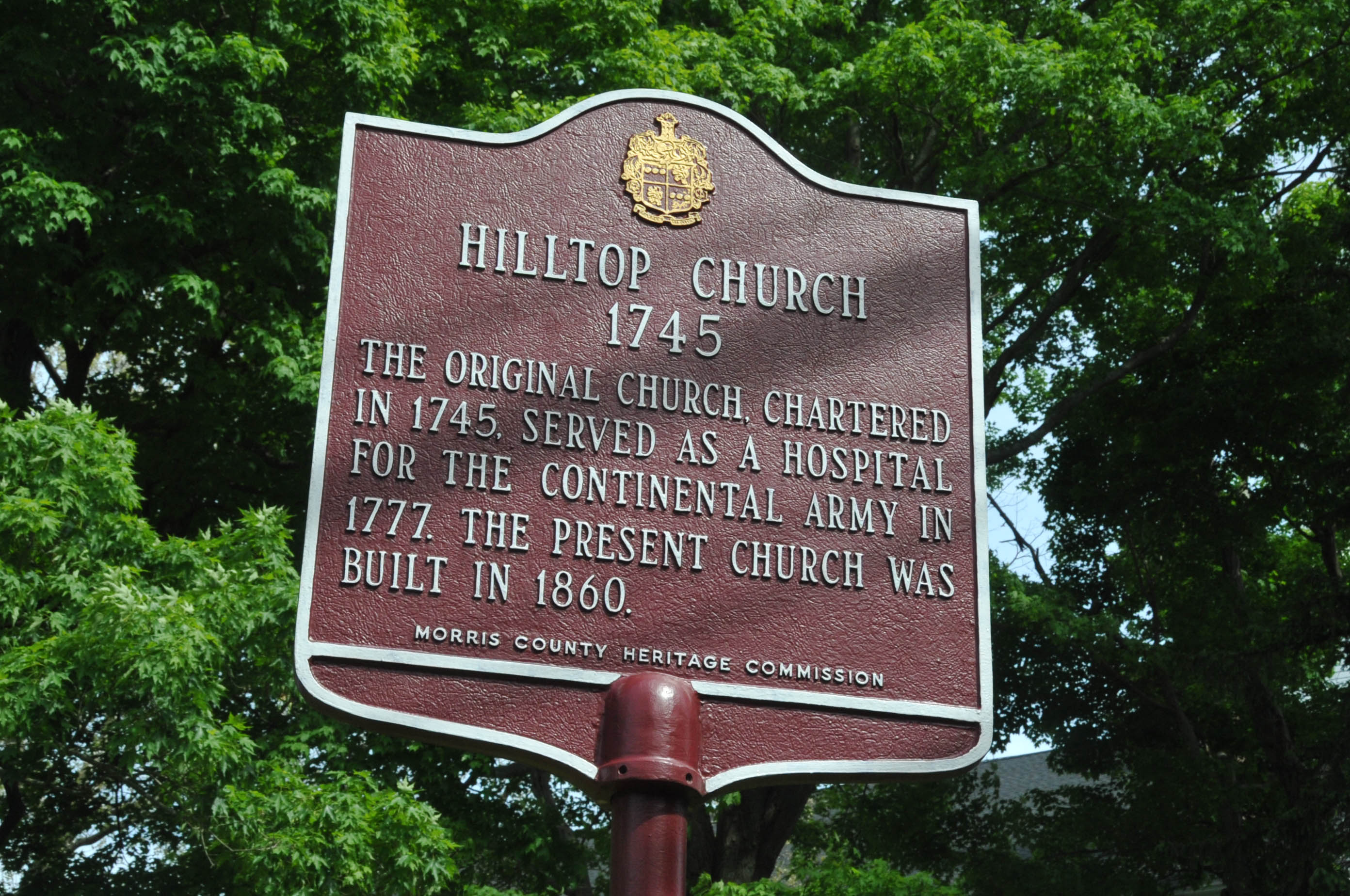
Morris County Heritage Commission sign for the Hilltop Church

== Geography ==
According to the United States Census Bureau, the borough had a total area of 5.98 square miles (15.49 km^{2}), including 5.93 square miles (15.36 km^{2}) of land and 0.05 square miles (0.13 km^{2}) of water (0.84%).

Nestled on the northern end of the Somerset Hills, the borough is completely surrounded by the larger Mendham Township along with Bernardsville in Somerset County to the south.

An unnamed pond in the borough is the source of the Passaic River. The North Branch Raritan River also originates in the borough.

As of 2026, the borough is a member of Local Leaders for Responsible Planning in order to address the borough's Mount Laurel doctrine-based housing obligations.

== Demographics ==
Historical population
Census	Pop.	Note	%±
1910	1,129		—
1920	969		−14.2%
1930	1,278		31.9%
1940	1,343		5.1%
1950	1,724		28.4%
1960	2,371		37.5%
1970	3,729		57.3%
1980	4,899		31.4%
1990	4,890		−0.2%
2000	5,097		4.2%
2010	4,981		−2.3%
2020	4,981		0.0%
2023 (est.)	4,970		−0.2%
Population sources: 1910–1920; 1910 1910–1930; 1940–2000 2000; 2010 2020

=== 2010 census ===
The 2010 United States census counted 4,981 people, 1,722 households, and 1,326 families in the borough. The population density was 837.1 per square mile (323.2/km^{2}). There were 1,798 housing units at an average density of 302.2 per square mile (116.7/km^{2}). The racial makeup was 95.70% (4,767) White, 1.02% (51) Black or African American, 0.04% (2) Native American, 2.05% (102) Asian, 0.08% (4) Pacific Islander, 0.18% (9) from other races, and 0.92% (46) from two or more races. Hispanic or Latino of any race were 2.71% (135) of the population.

Of the 1,722 households, 38.6% had children under the age of 18; 66.7% were married couples living together; 8.0% had a female householder with no husband present and 23.0% were non-families. Of all households, 20.3% were made up of individuals and 11.2% had someone living alone who was 65 years of age or older. The average household size was 2.74 and the average family size was 3.19.

28.4% of the population were under the age of 18, 4.5% from 18 to 24, 16.8% from 25 to 44, 31.3% from 45 to 64, and 19.0% who were 65 years of age or older. The median age was 45.1 years. For every 100 females, the population had 91.7 males. For every 100 females ages 18 and older there were 83.5 males.

The Census Bureau's 2006–2010 American Community Survey showed that (in 2010 inflation-adjusted dollars) median household income was $119,787 (with a margin of error of +/− $28,685) and the median family income was $155,139 (+/− $15,546). Males had a median income of $145,739 (+/− $16,687) versus $82,813 (+/− $42,257) for females. The per capita income for the borough was $51,875 (+/− $16,636). About 2.5% of families and 2.8% of the population were below the poverty line, including 2.1% of those under age 18 and 6.0% of those age 65 or over.

Based on data from the 2006–2010 American Community Survey, the borough had a per-capita income of $51,875, ranked 89th in the state.

=== 2000 census ===
As of the 2000 United States census there were 5,097 people, 1,781 households, and 1,380 families residing in the borough. The population density was 846.2 inhabitants per square mile (326.7/km^{2}). There were 1,828 housing units at an average density of 303.5 per square mile (117.2/km^{2}). The racial makeup of the borough was 97.14% White, 0.45% African American, 0.02% Native American, 1.41% Asian, 0.06% Pacific Islander, 0.27% from other races, and 0.65% from two or more races. Hispanic or Latino of any race were 2.45% of the population.

There were 1,781 households, out of which 36.6% had children under the age of 18 living with them, 69.3% were married couples living together, 6.7% had a female householder with no husband present, and 22.5% were same-sex couples. 18.6% of all households were made up of individuals, and 10.0% had someone living alone who was 65 years of age or older. The average household size was 2.72 and the average family size was 3.13.

In the borough the population was spread out, with 26.8% under the age of 18, 4.3% from 18 to 24, 24.1% from 25 to 44, 28.0% from 45 to 64, and 16.8% who were 65 years of age or older. The median age was 42 years. For every 100 females, there were 89.7 males. For every 100 females age 18 and over, there were 83.4 males.

The median income for a household in the borough was $110,348, and the median income for a family was $129,812. Males had a median income of $96,672 versus $48,542 for females. The per capita income for the borough was $48,629. About 2.6% of families and 4.1% of the population were below the poverty line, including 1.3% of those under age 18 and 13.5% of those age 65 or over.

In 2000, Mendham Borough had the 44th-highest per capita income in the state.

== Parks and recreation ==
Mendham is home to the Roxiticus Golf Club, which was used for a qualifying round for the New Jersey Open Championship in 2022. Mendham is also home to Borough Park in the center of town with basketball courts, baseball fields, tennis courts, and a playground.

== Government ==
=== Local government ===
Mendham Borough is governed under the borough form of New Jersey municipal government, one of 218 municipalities (of the 564) statewide that use this form, the most commonly used form of government in the state. The governing body is comprised of a mayor and a borough council, with all positions elected at-large on a partisan basis as part of the November general election. A mayor is elected directly by the voters to a four-year term of office. The borough council is comprised of six members elected to serve three-year terms on a staggered basis, with two seats coming up for election each year in a three-year cycle. The borough form of government used by Mendham Borough is a "weak mayor / strong council" government in which council members act as the legislative body with the mayor presiding at meetings and voting only in the event of a tie. The mayor can veto ordinances subject to an override by a two-thirds majority vote of the council. The mayor makes committee and liaison assignments for council members, and most appointments are made by the mayor with the advice and consent of the council.

The mayor is the head of the municipal government and as chief executive is responsible to see that all state laws and borough ordinances are faithfully executed. The mayor, presides over the borough council meetings and only votes in order to break a tie. The mayor can veto ordinances and appoint subordinate officials, ad hoc committees and certain other officials to boards, committees and commissions.

As of 2026, Republican James R. Kelly is serving as Mayor. Members of the Borough Council are Council President Neil Sullivan (R, 2028), Dr. Marilyn Althoff (R, 2026), Matthew Bruin (R, 2027), Chris Neff (D, 2028), Will Russo (R, 2026), and Alexandra Henry Traut (R, 2027).

=== Federal, state, and county representation ===
Mendham Borough is located in the 7th Congressional District and is part of New Jersey's 25th State Legislative District.

For the 119th United States Congress, New Jersey's 7th congressional district is represented by Thomas Kean Jr. (R, Westfield). New Jersey is represented in the United States Senate by Democrats Cory Booker (Newark, term ends 2027) and Andy Kim (Moorestown, term ends 2031).

For the 2026–2027 session, the 25th legislative district of the New Jersey Legislature is represented in the State Senate by Anthony M. Bucco (R, Boonton Township) and in the General Assembly by Aura K. Dunn (R, Mendham Borough) and Marisa Sweeney (D, Morristown).

Morris County is governed by a Board of County Commissioners comprised of seven members who are elected at-large in partisan elections to three-year terms on a staggered basis, with either one or three seats up for election each year as part of the November general election. Actual day-to-day operation of departments is supervised by County Administrator Deena Leary.

As of 2026, Morris County's Commissioners (with all terms ending December 31) are Director Stephen H. Shaw (R, Mountain Lakes, 2027), Deputy Director John Krickus (R, Washington Township, 2027), Douglas Cabana (R, Boonton Township, 2028), Thomas J. Mastrangelo (R, Montville, 2028), Christine Myers (R, Harding Township, 2028), Tayfun Selen (R, Chatham Township, 2026), and Deborah Smith (R, Denville Township, 2027).

The county's constitutional officers are County Clerk Ann F. Grossi (R, Parsippany–Troy Hills, 2028), Sheriff James M. Gannon (R, Boonton Township, 2025) and Surrogate Heather Darling (R, Roxbury, 2029).

=== Politics ===
United States presidential election results for Mendham Borough 2024 2020 2016 2012 2008 2004
Year	Republican		Democratic		Third party(ies)	
Year	No.	%	No.	%	No.	%
2024	1,539	47.53%	1,633	50.43%	66	2.04%
2020	1,622	46.68%	1,812	52.14%	41	1.18%
2016	1,445	50.02%	1,283	44.41%	161	5.57%
2012	1,666	64.40%	906	35.02%	15	0.58%
2008	1,726	57.78%	1,243	41.61%	18	0.60%
2004	1,810	61.29%	1,113	37.69%	30	1.02%

As of March 2011, there were a total of 3,701 registered voters in Mendham, of which 739 (20.0%) were registered as Democrats, 1,615 (43.6%) were registered as Republicans and 1,346 (36.4%) were registered as Unaffiliated. There was one voter registered to another party.

In the 2012 presidential election, Republican Mitt Romney received 64.4% of the vote (1,666 cast), ahead of Democrat Barack Obama with 35.0% (906 votes), and other candidates with 0.6% (15 votes), among the 2,598 ballots cast by the borough's 3,889 registered voters (11 ballots were spoiled), for a turnout of 66.8%. In the 2008 presidential election, Republican John McCain received 57.4% of the vote (1,726 cast), ahead of Democrat Barack Obama with 41.3% (1,243 votes) and other candidates with 0.6% (18 votes), among the 3,009 ballots cast by the borough's 3,854 registered voters, for a turnout of 78.1%. In the 2004 presidential election, Republican George W. Bush received 61.1% of the vote (1,810 ballots cast), outpolling Democrat John Kerry with 37.6% (1,113 votes) and other candidates with 0.8% (30 votes), among the 2,964 ballots cast by the borough's 3,885 registered voters, for a turnout percentage of 76.3.

Gubernatorial election results for Mendham Borough
Year	Republican		Democratic		Third party(ies)	
Year	No.	%	No.	%	No.	%
2025	1,382	50.62%	1,336	48.94%	12	0.44%
2021	1,252	55.74%	980	43.63%	14	0.62%
2017	1,125	59.30%	744	39.22%	28	1.48%
2013	1,695	79.99%	399	18.83%	25	1.18%
2009	1,541	66.39%	562	24.21%	218	9.39%
2005	1,208	63.85%	646	34.14%	38	2.01%

In the 2013 gubernatorial election, Republican Chris Christie received 80.0% of the vote (1,695 cast), ahead of Democrat Barbara Buono with 18.8% (399 votes), and other candidates with 1.2% (25 votes), among the 2,143 ballots cast by the borough's 3,851 registered voters (24 ballots were spoiled), for a turnout of 55.6%. In the 2009 gubernatorial election, Republican Chris Christie received 66.2% of the vote (1,541 ballots cast), ahead of Democrat Jon Corzine with 24.1% (562 votes), Independent Chris Daggett with 9.1% (213 votes) and other candidates with 0.2% (5 votes), among the 2,328 ballots cast by the borough's 3,735 registered voters, yielding a 62.3% turnout.

United States Senate election results for Mendham Borough1
Year	Republican		Democratic		Third party(ies)	
Year	No.	%	No.	%	No.	%
2024	1,537	49.12%	1,551	49.57%	41	1.31%
2018	1,508	58.95%	1,004	39.25%	46	1.80%
2012	1,573	64.23%	850	34.71%	26	1.06%
2006	1,296	63.22%	730	35.61%	24	1.17%

United States Senate election results for Mendham Borough2
Year	Republican		Democratic		Third party(ies)	
Year	No.	%	No.	%	No.	%
2020	1,735	50.76%	1,669	48.83%	14	0.41%
2014	976	61.97%	587	37.27%	12	0.76%
2013	830	58.29%	583	40.94%	11	0.77%
2008	1,766	63.48%	986	35.44%	30	1.08%

== Education ==
Public school students in pre-kindergarten through eighth grade attend the Mendham Borough Schools. As of the 2020–21 school year, the district, comprised of two schools, had an enrollment of 485 students and 53.4 classroom teachers (on an FTE basis), for a student–teacher ratio of 9.1:1. Schools in the district (with 2020–21 enrollment data from the National Center for Education Statistics) are Hilltop Elementary School with 241 students in grades PreK-4 and Mountain View Middle School with 241 students in grades 5–8.

Students in public school for ninth through twelfth grades attend West Morris Mendham High School, which is located in Mendham Borough and serves students from Chester Borough, Chester Township, Mendham Borough and Mendham Township. The school is part of the West Morris Regional High School District, which also serves students from Washington Township at West Morris Central High School. As of the 2020–21 school year, the high school had an enrollment of 1,142 students and 91.9 classroom teachers (on an FTE basis), for a student–teacher ratio of 12.4:1. The high school district's board of education is comprised of nine members who are elected directly by voters to serve three-year terms of office on a staggered basis. The nine seats on the board of education are allocated based on the populations of the constituent municipalities, with one seat assigned to Mendham Borough.

Saint Joseph School was a Catholic school established in 1963 and operated under the auspices of the Roman Catholic Diocese of Paterson that serves students in preschool through eighth grade. Founded in 1963, the school was recognized in 2012 by the National Blue Ribbon Schools Program.

The Westmont Montessori School, established in 1964, is the second-oldest Montessori school in New Jersey. It has served approximately 2,500 children ages 15 months to 6 years old in its 50-year history. Westmont is dually accredited by the American Montessori Society and the Middle States Association of Colleges and Schools.

Until 2005, Mendham was home to the Assumption College for Sisters, a two-year women's college that is open to lay students as well as those pursuing religious lives, operated by the Sisters of Christian Charity; the school has moved to the Morris Catholic High School campus in Denville Township.

== Transportation ==
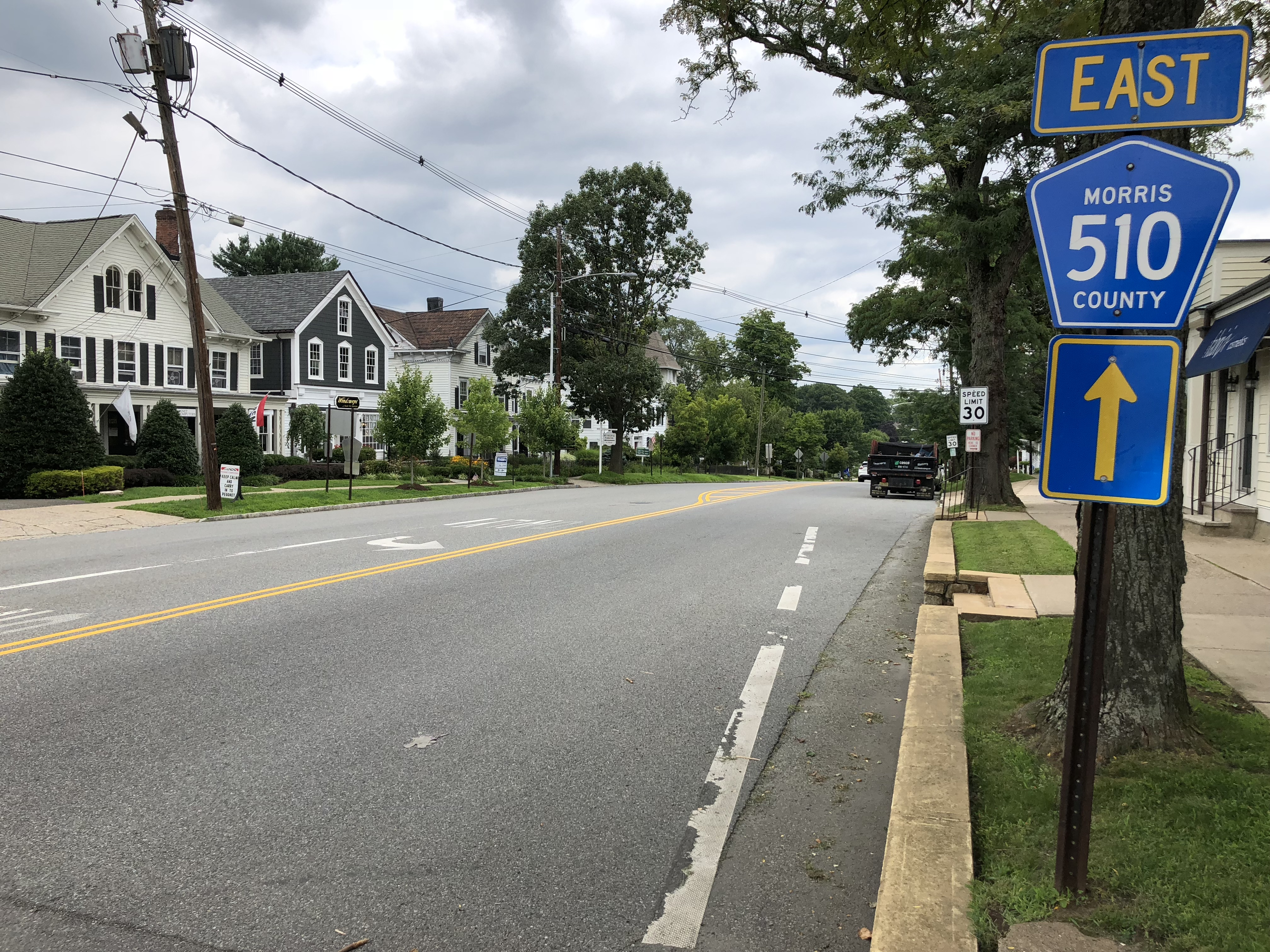
County Route 510 eastbound in Mendham

=== Roads and highways ===
As of May 2010, the borough had a total of 28.40 miles (45.71 km) of roadways, of which 22.76 miles (36.63 km) were maintained by the municipality and 5.64 miles (9.08 km) by Morris County.

No Interstate, U.S. or state highways pass through Mendham. The most significant roadways directly serving the borough are County Route 510 and County Route 525.

=== Public transportation ===
NJ Transit offered service on the MCM4 and MCM5 routes until 2010, when subsidies to the local provider were eliminated as part of budget cuts.

Midtown Direct express train line service into New York Penn Station in Midtown Manhattan and to Hoboken Terminal is available at the Morristown station.

== Notable people ==
People who were born in, residents of, or otherwise closely associated with Mendham Borough include:

- Jack Alexy (born 2003), competitive swimmer
- George Dod Armstrong (1813–1899), Presbyterian minister and author
- Adam Boyd (1746–1835), politician who represented New Jersey in Congress from 1803 to 1805, and again from 1808 to 1813
- Neil Cavuto (born 1958), Fox News network host
- Abner Doubleday (1819–1893), Union Army General during the American Civil War and the subject of a myth regarding his supposed founding of baseball
- Maggie Doyne (born c. 1986), philanthropist recognized for her work developing an orphanage and school in the Kopila Valley of Nepal after spending time in that country during a gap year after completing high school
- Aura K. Dunn (born 1971), politician who has represented the 25th Legislative District in the New Jersey General Assembly
- William Hillcourt (1900–1992), Dane who founded Boy Scouts of America Troop 1 of Mendham in 1935 to test his theories of Scouting
- Robert Mulcahy (1932–2022), former athletic director at Rutgers University and former mayor
- Rosie Napravnik (born 1988), thoroughbred racehorse jockey

== Notable businesses ==
- Van Dessel Sports, bicycle brand.

== See also ==
- National Register of Historic Places listings in Morris County, New Jersey
