= Washington Township Schools =

School district in Morris County, New Jersey, US

Address
- 53 West Mill Road Long Valley, Morris County, New Jersey, 07853; United States
- Coordinates: 40.783359°N 74.784265°W

District information
- Grades: PreK-8
- Superintendent: Marybeth Kopacz (interim)
- Business administrator: Katherine Deriso
- Schools: 4

Students and staff
- Enrollment: 1,938 (as of 2020–21)
- Faculty: 196.9 FTEs
- Student–teacher ratio: 9.8:1

Other information
- District Factor Group: I
- Website: www.wtschools.org
Ind.	Per pupil	District spending	Rank (*)	K-8 average	%± vs. average
1A	Total Spending	$18,672	64	$18,891	−1.2%
1	Budgetary Cost	14,751	55	14,159	4.2%
2	Classroom Instruction	9,319	66	8,659	7.6%
6	Support Services	2,572	71	2,167	18.7%
8	Administrative Cost	1,253	12	1,547	−19.0%
10	Operations & Maintenance	1,529	43	1,612	−5.1%
13	Extracurricular Activities	79	34	104	−24.0%
16	Median Teacher Salary	66,158	71	61,136
Data from NJDoE 2014 Taxpayers' Guide to Education Spending. *Of K-8 districts with more than 750 students. Lowest spending=1; Highest=84

The Washington Township Schools are a community public school district that serves students in pre-kindergarten through eighth grade from Washington Township, in Morris County, in the U.S. state of New Jersey.

As of the 2020–21 school year, the district, comprising four schools, had an enrollment of 1,938 students and 196.9 classroom teachers (on an FTE basis), for a student–teacher ratio of 9.8:1.

The district is classified by the New Jersey Department of Education as being in District Factor Group "I", the second-highest of eight groupings. District Factor Groups organize districts statewide to allow comparison by common socioeconomic characteristics of the local districts. From lowest socioeconomic status to highest, the categories are A, B, CD, DE, FG, GH, I and J.

Students in public school for ninth through twelfth grades attend West Morris Central High School, which is located in the township, but has a Chester mailing address. The school is part of the West Morris Regional High School District, which also serves students from the surrounding Morris County school districts of Chester Borough, Chester Township, Mendham Borough, Mendham Township, who attend West Morris Mendham High School. As of the 2020–21 school year, the high school had an enrollment of 1,098 students and 94.5 classroom teachers (on an FTE basis), for a student–teacher ratio of 11.6:1.

== Schools ==
Schools in the district (with 2020–21 enrollment data from the National Center for Education Statistics) are:

Elementary schools

- Benedict A. Cucinella Elementary School with 451 students in grades PreK-5
  - Christopher Perruso, principal
- Flocktown-Kossmann School with 442 students in grades PreK-5
  - Michael Craver, principal
- Old Farmers Road School with 310 students in grades K-5
  - Jenna Hawkswell, principal

Middle school

- Long Valley Middle School with 720 students in grades 6-8
  - Mark Ippolito, principal

== Administration ==
Core members of the district's administration are:

- Marybeth Kopacz, interim superintendent
- Katherine Deriso, business administrator and board secretary

== Board of education ==
The district's board of education is comprised of nine members who set policy and oversee the fiscal and educational operation of the district through its administration. As a Type II school district, the board's trustees are elected directly by voters to serve three-year terms of office on a staggered basis, with three seats up for election each year held (since 2012) as part of the November general election. The board appoints a superintendent to oversee the district's day-to-day operations and a business administrator to supervise the business functions of the district.
