= Mendham Borough Schools =

School district in Morris County, New Jersey, US

Address
- 12 Hilltop Road Mendham Borough, Morris County, New Jersey, 07945; United States
- Coordinates: 40.7747°N 74.5990°W

District information
- Grades: PreK-8
- Superintendent: Mitzi N. Morillo
- Business administrator: Vanessa Wolsky
- Schools: 2

Students and staff
- Enrollment: 485 (as of 2020–21)
- Faculty: 53.4 FTEs
- Student–teacher ratio: 9.1:1

Other information
- District Factor Group: J
- Website: www.mendhamboro.org
Ind.	Per pupil	District spending	Rank (*)	K-8 average	%± vs. average
1A	Total Spending	$17,274	23	$18,891	−8.6%
1	Budgetary Cost	13,661	26	14,159	−3.5%
2	Classroom Instruction	8,027	22	8,659	−7.3%
6	Support Services	2,128	29	2,167	−1.8%
8	Administrative Cost	1,767	39	1,547	14.2%
10	Operations & Maintenance	1,602	34	1,612	−0.6%
13	Extracurricular Activities	137	37	104	31.7%
16	Median Teacher Salary	60,555	35	61,136
Data from NJDoE 2014 Taxpayers' Guide to Education Spending. *Of K-8 districts with 401-750 students. Lowest spending=1; Highest=64

The Mendham Borough Schools are a community public school district that serves students in pre-kindergarten through eighth grade from Mendham Borough, in Morris County, in the U.S. state of New Jersey.

As of the 2020–21 school year, the district, comprising two schools, had an enrollment of 485 students and 53.4 classroom teachers (on an FTE basis), for a student–teacher ratio of 9.1:1.

Students in public school for ninth through twelfth grades attend West Morris Mendham High School, which is located in Mendham Borough and serves students from Chester Borough, Chester Township, Mendham Borough and Mendham Township. The school is part of the West Morris Regional High School District, which also serves students from Washington Township at West Morris Mendham High School. As of the 2020–21 school year, the high school had an enrollment of 1,142 students and 91.9 classroom teachers (on an FTE basis), for a student–teacher ratio of 12.4:1.

The district is classified by the New Jersey Department of Education as being in District Factor Group "J", the highest of eight groupings. District Factor Groups organize districts statewide to allow comparison by common socioeconomic characteristics of the local districts. From lowest socioeconomic status to highest, the categories are A, B, CD, DE, FG, GH, I and J.

== History ==
Mendham Borough Schools made news in February 2014 when former superintendent Janie Edmonds received a $124,593 annual pension after having served in her role for 7 1/2 years, making her among the highest-paid retired public employees in New Jersey.

== Awards and recognition ==
In 2023, Hilltop Elementary School was one of nine schools in New Jersey that was recognized as a National Blue Ribbon School by the United States Department of Education.

== Schools ==
Schools in the district (with 2020–21 enrollment data from the National Center for Education Statistics) are:

Elementary school

- Hilltop Elementary School with 241 students in grades PreK-4
  - Christopher Mucha, principal

Middle school

- Mountain View Middle School with 241 students in grades 5–8
  - Aimee Toth, principal

== Administration ==
Core members of the district's administration are:

- Mitzi N. Morillo, superintendent
- Vanessa Wolsky, business administrator and board secretary

== Board of education ==
The district's board of education is comprised of nine members who set policy and oversee the fiscal and educational operation of the district through its administration. As a Type II school district, the board's trustees are elected directly by voters to serve three-year terms of office on a staggered basis, with three seats up for election each year held (since 2012) as part of the November general election. The board appoints a superintendent to oversee the district's day-to-day operations and a business administrator to supervise the business functions of the district.
