= West Morris High School =

West Morris High School may refer to:

- West Morris Central High School in Washington Township, Morris County, New Jersey
- West Morris Mendham High School in Mendham Borough, Morris County, New Jersey
