= Chester School District =

School district in Morris County, New Jersey, US

Address
- 415 Route 24 (Chester Township), (Morris County), (New Jersey), 07930; United States
- Coordinates: 40.7781°N 74.6670°W

District information
- Grades: PreK-8
- Superintendent: Christina VanWoert
- Business administrator: Tanya Dawson
- Schools: 3

Students and staff
- Enrollment: 1,047 (as of 2020–21)
- Faculty: 106.1 FTEs
- Student–teacher ratio: 9.9:1

Other information
- District Factor Group: J
- Website: www.chester-nj.org
Ind.	Per pupil	District spending	Rank (*)	K-8 average	%± vs. average
1A	Total Spending	$19,582	74	$18,891	3.7%
1	Budgetary Cost	14,783	57	14,159	4.4%
2	Classroom Instruction	8,836	52	8,659	2.0%
6	Support Services	2,442	62	2,167	12.7%
8	Administrative Cost	1,678	54	1,547	8.5%
10	Operations & Maintenance	1,699	58	1,612	5.4%
13	Extracurricular Activities	110	55	104	5.8%
16	Median Teacher Salary	62,735	54	61,136
Data from NJDoE 2014 Taxpayers' Guide to Education Spending. *Of K-8 districts with more than 750 students. Lowest spending=1; Highest=84

The Chester School District is a fully accredited elementary public school district responsible for the education of students in pre-kindergarten through eighth grades from Chester Borough and Chester Township, two municipalities in Morris County, in the U.S. state of New Jersey.

As of the 2020–21 school year, the district, comprising three schools, had an enrollment of 1,047 students and 106.1 classroom teachers (on an FTE basis), for a student–teacher ratio of 9.9:1.

The district is classified by the New Jersey Department of Education as being in District Factor Group "J", the highest of eight groupings. District Factor Groups organize districts statewide to allow comparison by common socioeconomic characteristics of the local districts. From lowest socioeconomic status to highest, the categories are A, B, CD, DE, FG, GH, I and J.

Students in public school for ninth through twelfth grades in both communities attend West Morris Mendham High School, which serves students from the surrounding Morris County school districts of Chester Borough, Chester Township, Mendham Borough and Mendham Township. The high school is part of the West Morris Regional High School District, which also serves students from Washington Township, who attend West Morris Central High School As of the 2020–21 school year, the high school had an enrollment of 1,142 students and 91.9 classroom teachers (on an FTE basis), for a student–teacher ratio of 12.4:1.

== History ==
In June 2015, a feasibility study was released that discussed potential changes to the West Morris Regional High School District. In one scenario, West Morris Mendham High School would be stripped away from the district to become a standalone regional high school for the Chesters and Mendhams. In the second scenario, the existing PreK-8 districts would be dissolved and combined with West Morris Mendham to create a consolidated PreK-12 district. In either scenario, Washington Township would take over West Morris Central High School and become its own PreK-12 district. Significant tax savings would have been achieved for the Chesters and Mendhams under both scenarios, with equivalent tax increases for Washington Township.

== Schools ==
Schools in the district (with 2020–21 enrollment data from the National Center for Education Statistics) are:

Elementary schools

- Dickerson Elementary School with 317 students in grades PreK-2
  - Melissa Fair, principal
- Bragg Elementary School with 325 students in grades 3-5
  - Michele Stanton, principal

Middle school

- Black River Middle School with 402 students in grades 6-8
  - Andrew White, principal

Dickerson and Bragg Schools are located on County Route 510, east of Chester Borough; Black River Middle School is on County Route 513 (North Road), north of Chester Borough.

== Administration ==
Core members of the district's administration are:

- Christina VanWoert, superintendent
- Tanya Dawson, business administrator and board secretary

== Board of education ==
The district's board of education is comprised of nine members who set policy and oversee the fiscal and educational operation of the district through its administration. As a Type II school district, the board's trustees are elected directly by voters to serve three-year terms of office on a staggered basis, with three seats up for election each year held (since 2012) as part of the November general election. The board appoints a superintendent to oversee the district's day-to-day operations and a business administrator to supervise the business functions of the district. As a consolidated school district, all residents in the two constituent municipalities vote for board members who represent the entire district, not just the municipality in which they reside.
