= Larison's Turkey Farm =

Restaurant information
- Established: Original structure 1800; notable restaurant in 1950
- Closed: 2000 and 2009
- City: Chester Borough
- State: New Jersey
- Coordinates: 40°47′2″N 74°41′56″W

Larison’s Turkey Farm was a restaurant in Chester Borough, New Jersey.

The initial structure was a farmhouse from 1800, which Isaac Corwin built on farmland purchased from Benjamin Luse.

In an interview of his childhood, Chester resident Herman Rademacher attests there were 100 turkeys circa 1936. Children of the Chester community would make noises (e.g., "gobble gobble") to the hundred turkeys to elicit a response.

According to its signage in a circa 1940 postcard, it sold turkeys, turkey livers, frozen turkeys, and turkey eggs.

In 1945, Willis Larison purchased the farm and converted it to “Larison’s Turkey Farm Inn.”

It opened as a family restaurant around 1950, becoming a tourist attraction in Chester. In 1974, restaurateur Arthur McGreevy purchased the property. The restaurant was decorated with antiques including Tiffany lamps and taxidermy. Dinners were served family style with platters of meats and sides passed around the table.

The Daily Record claimed the restaurant "closed in 2000, and has been unsuccessfully revived three times since, the last one closing in 2009."

On December 4, 2021, realtor Robert Berlant conducted a site visit for the former farm while dressed as a turkey. While in costume, Berlant toured the general public as well as members of the Chester Land Use Board, including facilitating entry to the former restaurant.
