= Ralph Barkman =

American football player (1907–1998)

- Barkman c. 1930

Profile
- Position: Back

Personal information
- Born: September 22, 1907; Chester Township, New Jersey
- Died: December 9, 1998 (aged 91); Chester, New Jersey
- Listed height: 5 ft 8 in (1.73 m)
- Listed weight: 165 lb (75 kg)

Career information
- High school: Roxbury (NJ)
- College: Schuylkill

Career history
- Orange Tornadoes (1929)

Career NFL statistics
- Games: 8

Ralph S. "Mose" Barkman (September 22, 1907 – December 9, 1998) was an American football player.

A New Jersey native, he played prep football at Roxbury High School. He then played college football as a halfback for Schuylkill College from 1925 to 1928 and was the captain of the school's 1928 football team. Known as "the boy with the ball-bearing hips", he reportedly gained over 1,000 yards for Schuylkill in nine games during the 1927 season.

He also played professional football in the National Football League (NFL) as a back for the Orange Tornadoes. He appeared in eight NFL games, four as a starter, during the 1929 season.
