= William Segal =

William Segal (1904–2000) was an American magazine publisher and self-taught artist whose work often reflected his interest in Eastern philosophies and religions. Segal is known for his self-portraits and his belief in self-discovery through art.

== Early life ==
Born in 1904, Segal came from Macon, Georgia but moved to New York on an athletic scholarship and began to study art at the Art Students League at New York University. Before World War II, he became involved in the magazine industry, beginning in Germany where his clientele were based in the new plastics industry at the time. His later ventures introduced him to men's fashion, creating a newsletter and in 1946 helped establish the American Fabrics magazine. With the introduction of synthetic fabrics, American Fabrics, along with his later publications such as Gentry magazine, along with the International Color Authority, helped establish him in the business. By the age of 30, Segal became a millionaire.

== Paintings ==
Since his days at New York University, Segal had enjoyed painting. After frequent visits to Japan, Segal began to study Zen Buddhism, studying with D.T. Suzuki. It is then that Segal began to paint more, particularly self-portraits. Finding solace in creating his works, his self-portraits, among his other works, often served as a vehicle for self-reflection and self-discovery. In the mid-1970s Segal attended a drawing class at a church in Dorchester, Massachusetts and met a young Ken Burns, whose friendship grew over time. In 1992, their relationship was solidified when Segal asked Burns to help him create a thirteen-minute film, on his life and work to showcase at an upcoming exhibition in Japan. Burns agreed and spent time documenting Segal's life and philosophy on his farm in Chester Township, New Jersey. Though one of his lesser known works, Burns's William Segal, along with his two addition films, Vézelay (1995) and In the Marketplace (1999) about the artist, were well received.

== Later life ==
Segal was a long-time student of the Armenian/Greek spiritual teacher George Gurdjieff.

Segal was the subject of three short documentary films made by his friend, Ken Burns.

Segal died May 16, 2000, at the age of 95.

== Bibliography ==
=== Books ===
- A Voice at the Borders of Silence by William Segal, Marielle Bancou-Segal
- Opening: Collected Writings of William Segal, 1985-1997 by William Segal, edited by Jon Pepper

=== Videos ===
- Seeing, Searching, Being: William Segal - Three Films By Ken Burns
