= Adam Zeis =

American writer and podcaster (born 1978)

- Born: November 14, 1978 (age 47); Morristown, New Jersey
- Occupations: Managing Editor, The Streamable
- Known for: Writer, Editor, Podcaster

Adam Zeis is an American writer and podcaster born in Morristown, New Jersey, on November 14, 1978, who currently serves as the Managing Editor of The Streamable.

== Journalism ==
Zeis graduated West Morris Mendham High School in 1997 and attended Fairleigh Dickinson University with a major in Computer Science. Zeis completed two years at FDU before dropping out to work as a full-time manager of a local video store, where he had been working part-time since 1997. In 2008, Zeis began writing for the BlackBerry fansite CrackBerry.com as a part-time contributor. In late 2008, he left his retail job to pursue blogging at CrackBerry.com full-time. Working under editor-in-chief Kevin Michaluk, Zeis ran the day-to-day on CrackBerry as Managing Editor.

In January 2014, Zeis was also named Editor-in-Chief of Smartwatch Fans, a fan site that was focused purely on smartwatches and wearable devices. As part of the Mobile Nations network, Smartwatch Fans was the first non-mobile site under the Mobile Nations name. In April 2014, Smartwatch Fans was rebranded to Connectedly.com, a site focused on connected devices, wearables, and the Internet of Things. Zeis left his position at CrackBerry.com in June 2014 to take on Connectedly full-time. In March 2019, Mobile Nations was acquired by Future PLC. Zeis was the editorial director of High Yield content at Future until September 2024, working with brands such as Tom's Guide and TechRadar. He now serves as Managing Editor of The Streamable.

== Podcasting ==
Zeis is best known for his hosting role on the CrackBerry.com podcast alongside Kevin Michaluk and Chris (Bla1ze) Parsons. As of July 2014, the CrackBerry Podcast has over 100 shows in total.
