= West Morris Regional High School District =

School district in Morris County, New Jersey, US

Address
- 10 South Four Bridges Road Chester Township, New Jersey, Morris County, New Jersey, 07930; United States
- Coordinates: 40.80851°N 74.730149°W

District information
- Grades: 9-12
- Superintendent: Steve Ryan
- Business administrator: Sharon Krizko
- Schools: 2

Students and staff
- Enrollment: 2,110 (as of 2023–24)
- Faculty: 168.0 FTEs
- Student–teacher ratio: 12.6:1

Other information
- District Factor Group: I
- Website: www.wmrhsd.org
Ind.	Per pupil	District spending	Rank (*)	9-12 average	%± vs. average
1A	Total Spending	$23,500	13	$21,866	7.5%
1	Budgetary Cost	17,656	16	16,599	6.4%
2	Classroom Instruction	9,775	17	9,724	0.5%
6	Support Services	2,953	28	2,701	9.3%
8	Administrative Cost	1,841	24	1,774	3.8%
10	Operations & Maintenance	1,851	8	1,985	−6.8%
13	Extracurricular Activities	1,213	33	331	266.5%
16	Median Teacher Salary	77,890	23	72,376
Data from NJDoE 2019 Taxpayers' Guide to Education Spending. *Of 9-12 districts with any number of students. Lowest spending=1; Highest=47

The West Morris Regional High School District is a limited purpose regional public high school district in New Jersey that serves students from the surrounding Morris County communities of Chester Borough, Chester Township, Mendham Borough, Mendham Township and Washington Township. Elementary school students of the constituent municipalities attend separate K-8 school districts maintained by four of the five municipalities; Chester Borough and Chester Township schools are consolidated under the Chester School District and the remaining three municipalities each have their own districts (Mendham Borough Schools, Mendham Township Public Schools and Washington Township Schools).

As of the 2023–24 school year, the district, comprised of two schools, had an enrollment of 2,110 students and 168.0 classroom teachers (on an FTE basis), for a student–teacher ratio of 12.6:1.

Both schools in the district are accredited by the New Jersey Department of Education, the Gilder Lehrman Institute of American History and the International Baccalaureate program. In August 2015, West Morris Central (ranked 151st) and Mendham (18th) were ranked among "America's Top High Schools 2015" by Newsweek magazine.

West Morris Mendham High School was ranked as the seventh-most challenging public, non-magnet, non-charter high school in 2017 by The Washington Post and the most challenging such school in New Jersey.

== History ==
The district was established in March 1956 and the "West Morris" name was adopted the following month. The district's first school opened in September 1958, at what is now West Morris Central, with 531 students in grades 9-11 in a building with 39 classrooms designed to accommodate a maximum enrollment of 1,200.

Mount Olive Township was one of the original constituent municipalities of the regional district. Students from Mount Olive Township attended West Morris Central High School until 1972. West Morris Mount Olive High School, in Flanders, opened in 1972 and was operated by the regional district until the 1978–79 school year, with the West Morris Mount Olive High School class of 1978 being the last graduating class from this facility under the regional administration. The high school building and remaining faculty became part of the Mount Olive Township School District and has operated since then as Mount Olive High School.

In June 2015, a feasibility study requested by Chester Borough, Chester Township, Mendham Borough and Mendham Township was released that discussed potential restructuring of the West Morris Regional High School District, considering two different options. In one scenario, West Morris Mendham High School would be stripped away from the district to become a standalone regional high school for the Chesters and Mendhams. In the second scenario, the existing PreK-8 districts would be dissolved and combined with West Morris Mendham to create a consolidated PreK-12 district. In either scenario, Washington Township would take over West Morris Central High School and become its own PreK-12 district. Significant tax savings would have been achieved for the Chesters and Mendhams under both scenarios, with equivalent tax increases for Washington Township.

The district had been classified by the New Jersey Department of Education as being in District Factor Group "I", the second-highest of eight groupings. District Factor Groups organize districts statewide to allow comparison by common socioeconomic characteristics of the local districts.

== Schools ==
Schools in the district (with 2023–24 enrollment data from the National Center for Education Statistics) are:

- West Morris Central High School was built in 1958 with 173,210 square feet (16,092 m^{2}) of space, is located in—and serves students from—Washington Township. with 1,023 students in grades 9–12
  - Timothy Rymer, principal
- West Morris Mendham High School was built in 1970 with 171,025 square feet (15,889 m^{2}) of space, is located in Mendham Borough and serves Chester Borough, Chester Township, Mendham Borough and Mendham Township. with 1,044 students in grades 9–12
  - Anne Meagher, principal

== Administration ==
Core members of the district's administration are:

- Stephen Ryan, superintendent. Ryan was appointed effective April 1, 2025, to fill the vacancy left following the resignation of Barbara Sargent, and was given a five-year contract at a starting salary of $248,000.
- Sharon Krizko, business administrator and board secretary

== Board of education ==
The district's board of education, comprised of nine members, sets policy and oversees the fiscal and educational operation of the district through its administration. As a Type II school district, the board's trustees are elected directly by voters to serve three-year terms of office on a staggered basis, with three seats up for election each year held (since 2012) as part of the November general election. The board appoints a superintendent to oversee the district's day-to-day operations and a business administrator to supervise the business functions of the district. The nine seats on the board of education are allocated based on the populations of the constituent municipalities, with four seats assigned to Washington Township, two to Chester Township and one each to Chester Borough, Mendham Borough and Mendham Township.
