= Molly Creamer =

American basketball player (born 1981)

Personal information
- Born: September 25, 1981 (age 45) Ridgewood, New Jersey, U.S.
- Listed height: 5 ft 10 in (1.78 m)
- Listed weight: 163 lb (74 kg)

Career information
- High school: West Morris Mendham (Mendham, New Jersey)
- College: Bucknell (1999–2003)
- WNBA draft: 2003: 1st round, 10th overall pick
- Drafted by: New York Liberty
- Position: Guard

Career highlights
- 3× Patriot League Player of the Year (2001–2003); 3× First-team All-Patriot League (2001–2003)
- Stats at Basketball Reference

Mary Margaret “Molly” Creamer (born September 25, 1981) is a current Andover High School history teacher and a former professional basketball player who was drafted in the first round of the 2003 WNBA draft by the New York Liberty. She is the first player from the Patriot League to be drafted into the WNBA.

A resident of Mendham Borough, New Jersey, Cramer played at West Morris Mendham High School.

== College ==
Creamer helped Bucknell University women's basketball team qualify for its first ever NCAA Division I tournament in 2002. In her final college season she averaged 27.1 points per game (ppg), a then-Patriot League season record. When she left Bucknell, she had broken or shared 19 Patriot League records.

== Career statistics ==
Legend
GP	Games played	GS	Games started	MPG	Minutes per game	RPG	Rebounds per game
APG	Assists per game	SPG	Steals per game	BPG	Blocks per game	PPG	Points per game
TO	Turnovers per game	FG%	Field-goal percentage	3P%	3-point field-goal percentage	FT%	Free-throw percentage
**Bold**	Career best	°	League leader

=== College ===
Year	Team	GP	GS	MPG	FG%	3P%	FT%	RPG	APG	SPG	BPG	TO	PPG
1999–00	Bucknell	30	-	-	41.2	31.6	82.4	3.3	3.6	2.1	**0.5**	-	15.8
2000–01	Bucknell	28	-	-	**46.4**	36.3	82.1	4.1	5.0	2.5	**0.5**	-	19.0
2001–02	Bucknell	**31**	-	-	44.4	**37.3**	**87.4**	**5.0**	5.8	2.8	0.4	-	22.4
2002–03	Bucknell	28	-	-	39.0	31.3	86.6	4.6	**6.0**	**3.1**	0.4	5.6	**27.1**
**Career**		117	-	-	39.0	34.2	85.1	4.3	5.1	2.6	0.5	5.6	21.0
Statistics retrieved from Sports-Reference.

== Post-basketball career ==
After playing basketball, Creamer co-created Find the Courage, an educational and inspirational program for youth. She then became a high school history teacher.

== Honors and awards ==
- All-time leading scorer in Patriot League history
- 2003 NCAA Division I Kodak/Women's Basketball Coaches Association (WBCA) All-America
- Patriot league women's basketball player of the year
