= Matt Flanagan (American football) =

American football player (born 1995)

No. 88
- Position: Tight end

Personal information
- Born: March 26, 1995 (age 31); Chester, New Jersey, U.S.
- Listed height: 6 ft 6 in (1.98 m)
- Listed weight: 260 lb (118 kg)

Career information
- High school: West Morris Mendham (Mendham Borough, New Jersey)
- College: Pittsburgh
- NFL draft: 2018: undrafted

Career history
- Washington Redskins (2018); Jacksonville Jaguars (2020)*
- * Offseason or practice squad member only

Career NFL statistics
- Receptions: 1
- Receiving yards: 14
- Stats at Pro Football Reference

Matt Flanagan (born March 26, 1995) is an American former professional football player who was a tight end in the National Football League (NFL). He played college football for the Pittsburgh Panthers, and was signed as an undrafted free agent by the Washington Redskins in 2018.

== Early life ==
Flanagan grew up in Chester, New Jersey and attended West Morris Mendham High School. For three years, he played varsity football and was on the varsity track team for the Minutemen, competing in shot put, discus, and javelin. During his senior year in 2012, Flanagan was an all-conference tight end, catching 22 passes for 273 yards and two touchdowns.

== College career ==
=== Rutgers ===
Flanagan spent the first four years of his collegiate career playing for the Rutgers Scarlet Knights, redshirting his freshman season. He began as a walk-on but eventually earned a scholarship. Over three seasons, Flanagan appeared in 33 games with 17 starts, recording 18 receptions for 145 yards and three touchdowns.

=== Pittsburgh ===
After his redshirt junior season, Flanagan transferred to the University of Pittsburgh for his final season of eligibility as a graduate transfer. He started nine games for the Panthers before a season-ending injury, catching 17 passes for 160 yards.

== Professional career ==
=== Washington Redskins ===
Flanagan signed with the Washington Redskins as an undrafted free agent on April 29, 2018. He was cut at the end of training camp and subsequently re-signed to the team's practice squad on September 2, 2018. Flanagan was promoted to the Redskins' active roster on December 15, 2018. He made his NFL debut on December 16, 2018, in a 16–13 win against the Jacksonville Jaguars. He made his first career catch, a 14-yard reception, in the Redskins' final game of the season against the Philadelphia Eagles. He appeared in three games as a rookie, playing primarily as a blocking tight end.

Flanagan was waived/injured during final roster cuts on August 31, 2019, and reverted to the team's injured reserve list the next day. He was waived from injured reserve with an injury settlement on September 5.

=== Jacksonville Jaguars ===
Flanagan was brought in for workouts by several teams during 2019 NFL season, but was not signed by any team. Flanagan had a tryout with the Jacksonville Jaguars on August 20, 2020. He was signed on August 22, 2020. He was waived on September 5, 2020 and signed to the practice squad the next day. He was released on September 18.
