= West Morris Central High School =

High school in Morris County, New Jersey, US

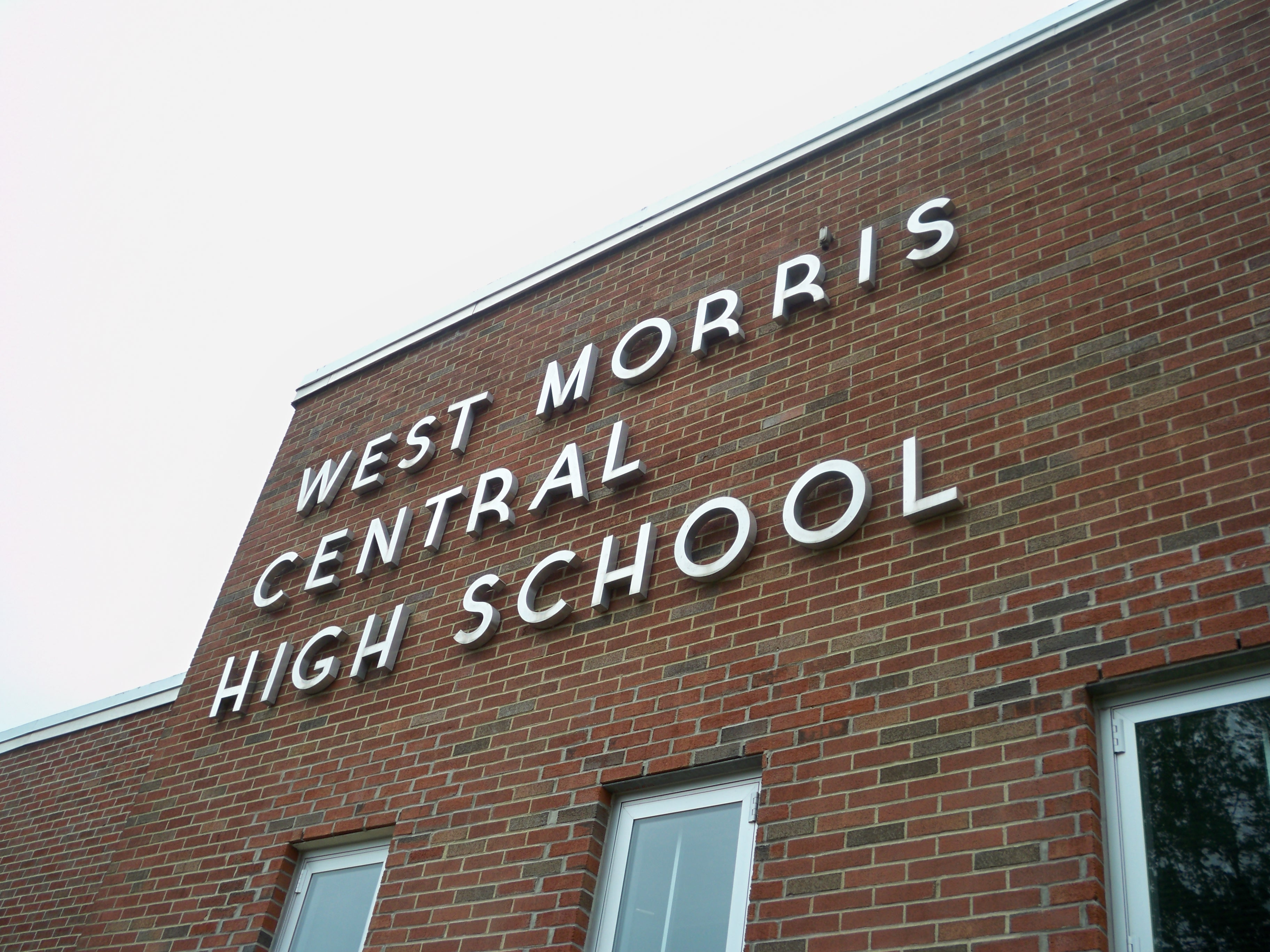

Location
- 259 Bartley Road; Chester Township, Morris County, New Jersey 07930; 40°48′36″N 74°43′40″W

Information
- Type: Public high school
- Established: 1958
- School district: West Morris Regional High School District
- NCES School ID: 341755004550
- Principal: Timothy Rymer
- Faculty: 82.8 FTEs
- Grades: 9-12
- Enrollment: 1,015 (as of 2024–25)
- Student to teacher ratio: 12.3:1
- Colors: Columbia Blue; Navy Blue; Gray
- Athletics conference: Northwest Jersey Athletic Conference (general); North Jersey Super Football Conference (football)
- Team name: Highlanders and Wolfpack
- Rival: West Morris Mendham High School
- Newspaper: The Paw
- Website: www.wmchs.org

West Morris Central High School (WMCHS) is a four-year comprehensive public high school that serves students in ninth through twelfth grades from Washington Township, Morris County, in the U.S. state of New Jersey. It is one of two high schools in the West Morris Regional High School District.

As of the 2024–25 school year, the school had an enrollment of 1,015 students and 82.8 classroom teachers (on an FTE basis), for a student–teacher ratio of 12.3:1. There were 14 students (1.4% of enrollment) eligible for free lunch and none eligible for reduced-cost lunch.

== History ==
The constituent municipalities—the Chester School District (Chester Borough / Township), Mendham Borough / Township, Mount Olive and Washington Township—approved a referendum in 1956 by a better than 7–1 margin for the construction of a high school to cost $1,961,000 (equivalent to $23.2 million in 2025).

The school opened in September 1958, with 531 students in grades 9–11 in a building with 39 classrooms designed to accommodate 1200 people. The school's first hire was a biology teacher named Maria Young.

== Academics ==
=== Programs ===
The school is accredited by the New Jersey Department of Education. The school has offered the IB Diploma Programme, as part of the International Baccalaureate Organization, since January 1998 The school was one of 17 high schools in New Jersey to offer the IB diploma program in 2021; along with its sister school West Morris Mendham, it is one of the two high schools in New Jersey to offer both the IB Diploma and Career Programs.

=== Awards ===
History Teacher Rosanne Lichatin, was named the 2005 Preserve America History Teacher of the Year, and was recognized with the honor by First Lady Laura Bush.

== Extracurricular activities ==
=== Athletics ===
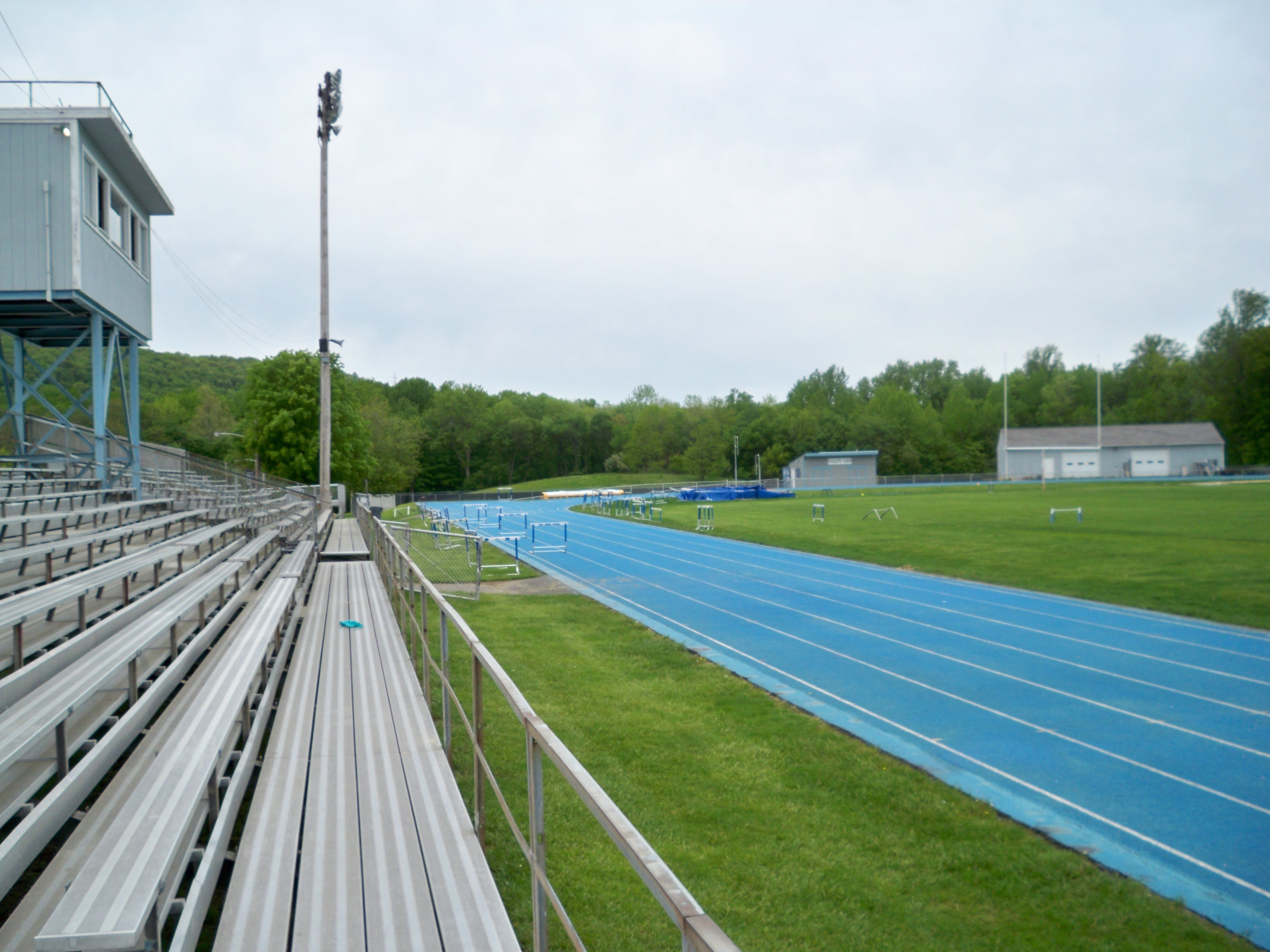
The school track surrounds the football field.

The school offers programs in baseball, basketball, cheerleading, fencing, women's field hockey, football, men's ice hockey, lacrosse, soccer, softball, swimming, tennis, unified sports, volleyball, wrestling, and track and field.

The school's mascots are either the Highlanders or the Wolfpack depending on the team. School colors are Columbia blue, navy blue and gray.

Teams compete in the Northwest Jersey Athletic Conference, an athletic conference comprised of high schools located in Morris, Sussex and Warren counties, which was established following a reorganization of sports leagues in Northern New Jersey by the New Jersey State Interscholastic Athletic Association (NJSIAA). Prior to the NJSIAA's 2009 realignment, the school had been a member of the Iron Hills Conference. With 919 students in grades 10–12, the school was classified by the NJSIAA for the 2019–20 school year as Group III for most athletic competition purposes, which included schools with an enrollment of 761 to 1,058 students in that grade range. The football team competes in the Freedom Blue division of the North Jersey Super Football Conference, which includes 112 schools competing in 20 divisions, making it the nation's biggest football-only high school sports league. The school was classified by the NJSIAA as Group III North for football for 2024–2026, which included schools with 700 to 884 students.

Football

The football team has won 11 sectional championships. The team won the North II Group III state sectional championship in 1982, 1991, 1995, 2001, 2004, 2009, 2021, 2022, 2023, and 2025 and won a North II Group IV title in 2012.

Ice hockey

The ice hockey team won the Halvorsen Cup in 2009, 2013 and 2014, and won the Haas Cup in 2010, 2022 and 2023.

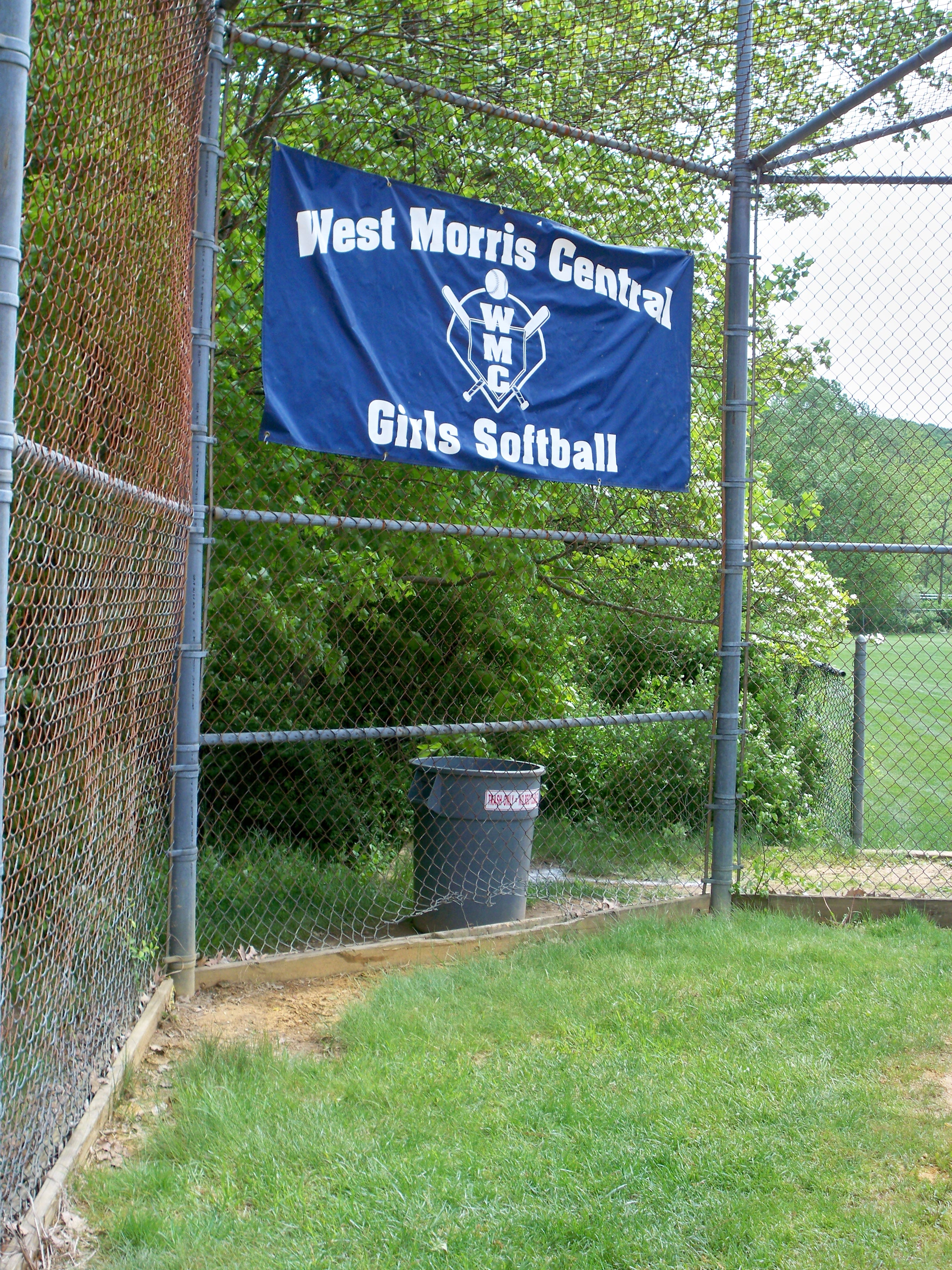
Girls Softball

=== Clubs ===
The clubs at West Morris Central have included: three a capella singing groups, Academy of Science, Archery Club, Art/Photography Club, Astronomy Club, Band Front, Book Club, Bowling Club, Volleyball Club, Chess Club, Chinese Club, Choral Club, Debate Club, Diversity Club, Fall Cheerleader, Fashion Design Club, FBLA, Film Club, Future Educators, Fishing Club, Gardening Club, Highlanders for Humanity, International/Cultural Arts Club, Intramurals, Investment Club, Jam Club, Kick Boxing, Literary Magazine, Marching Band, Math League, National History Club, National Honor Society, Newspaper, Project Peace Anti-Bullying Club, Reach (Peer Leadership), Red Cross, Relay for Life, School Store, Science League, Self-Defense Club, Service Learning Club, Ski Club, Sound/Lighting, Spikeball, Stage Craft, STARS, STEM (Technology Club), Student Council, Technology Club, Unified Sports Club, World Language Honor Society and Yearbook.

West Morris participates in the National Honor Society, as well as the French National Honor Society, Spanish National Honor Society and Chinese National Honor Society.

WMCHS is home to Central Theatre, West Morris' theatre troupe. Since 2016, many productions have been nominated or won theater awards presented by the Paper Mill Playhouse and Montclair State University.

== Notable alumni ==
- Tashy Bohm (born 1978/79), former backstroke, freestyle and butterfly competition swimmer
- Michael Burton (born 1992), American football fullback for the Denver Broncos of the National Football League
- Kyleigh D'Alessio (1990–2006), student at the school whose death in an auto accident inspired Kyleigh's Law
- Larry W. Maysey (1946–1967), United States Air Force pararescueman who was posthumously awarded the Air Force Cross, the Air Force's second-highest decoration (after the Medal of Honor)
- Tyler Muszelik (born 2004), professional ice hockey goaltender for the Charlotte Checkers of the American Hockey League
- Andrew Politi (born 1996), professional baseball pitcher
- Carley Shimkus (born 1986, class of 2005), news anchor and reporter who serves as a co-host on Fox Nation, headlines reporter for Fox & Friends and co-anchor for Fox & Friends First
- Jamie Smith (1972–1993), US Army corporal killed during the Battle of Mogadishu, subject of Black Hawk Down
- Bill Stepien (born 1978), former Deputy Chief of Staff for Governor Chris Christie, former political director for President Donald Trump and former campaign manager for the Donald Trump 2020 presidential campaign

== Sister school ==
- West Morris Mendham High School, which serves students from Chester Borough, Chester Township, Mendham Borough and Mendham Township.
