= Chester Township, New Jersey =

Township in Morris County, New Jersey, US

- Township
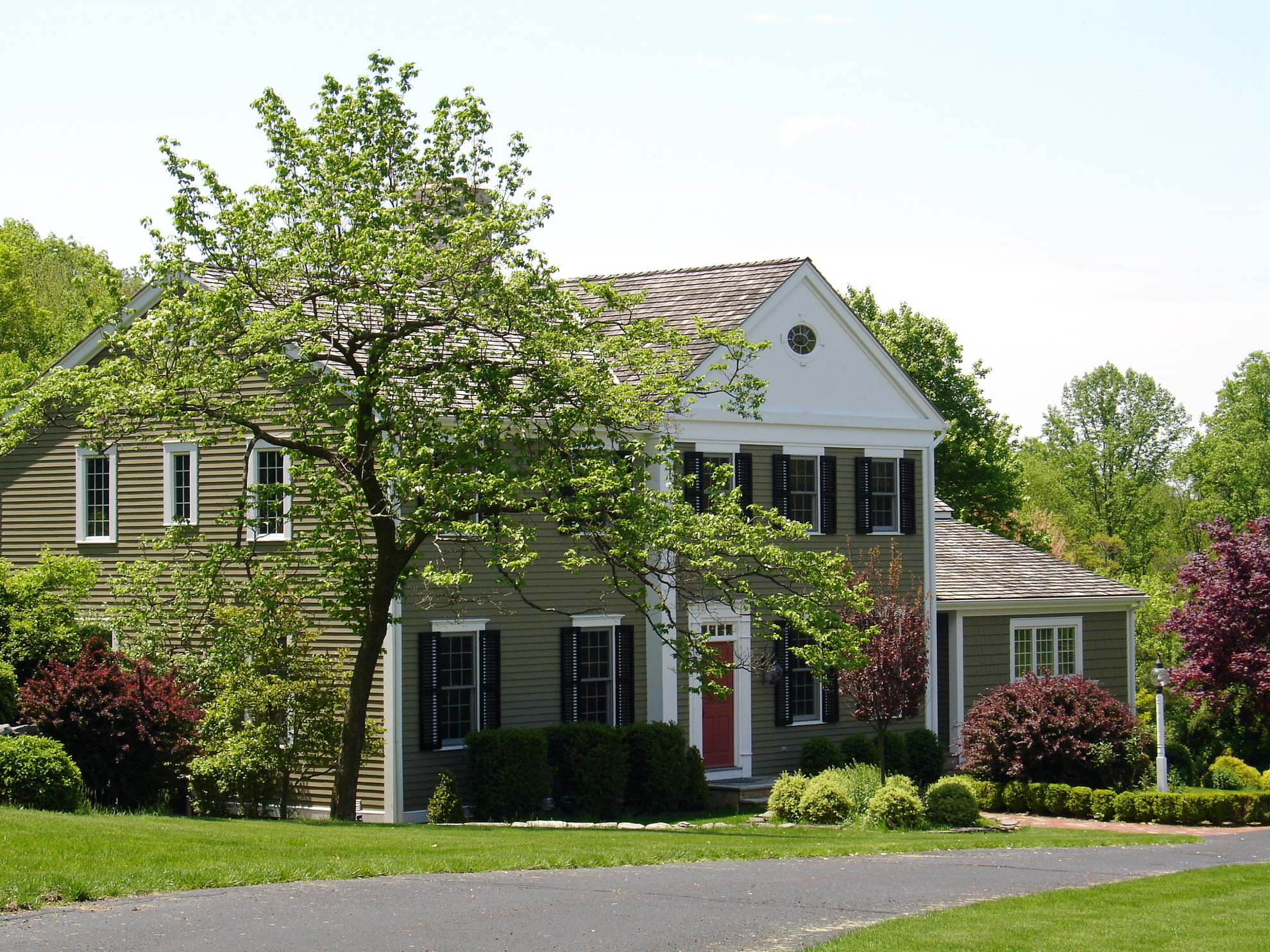
- A Federal-style Colonial home in Chester

- Seal

- Location of Chester Township in Morris County highlighted in red (right). Inset map: Location of Morris County in New Jersey highlighted in orange (left).

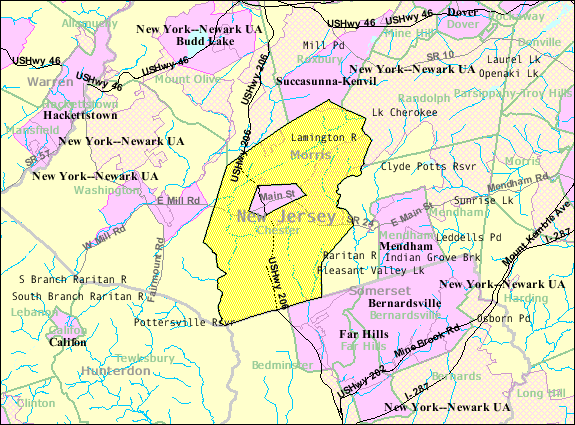
- Census Bureau map of Chester Township, New Jersey

- Location in Morris County Location in New Jersey Location in the United States
- Coordinates: 40.776758°N 74.686512°W
- Country: United States
- State: New Jersey
- County: Morris
- Incorporated: April 1, 1799
- Named after: Chester, England

Government
  - Type: Faulkner Act (small municipality)
  - Body: Township Council
  - Mayor: Timothy Drag (R, term ends December 31, 2028)
  - Administrator/Municipal clerk: Robin Collins

Area
  - Total: 29.22 sq mi (75.67 km^{2})
  - Land: 29.13 sq mi (75.45 km^{2})
  - Water: 0.085 sq mi (0.22 km^{2}) 0.29%
  - Rank: 93rd of 565 in state 5th of 39 in county
- Elevation: 787 ft (240 m)

Population (2020)
  - Total: 7,713
  - Estimate (2023): 7,706
  - Rank: 303rd of 565 in state 25th of 39 in county
  - Density: 264.8/sq mi (102.2/km^{2})
  - Rank: 487th of 565 in state 38th of 39 in county
- Time zone: UTC−05:00 (Eastern (EST))
  - Summer (DST): UTC−04:00 (Eastern (EDT))
- ZIP Codes: 07930: Chester; 07931: Far Hills; 07934: Gladstone
- Area code: 908
- FIPS code: 3402712610
- GNIS feature ID: 0882199
- Website: www.chestertownship.org

Chester Township is a township in southwestern Morris County, in the U.S. state of New Jersey. As of the 2020 United States census, the township's population was 7,713, a decrease of 125 (−1.6%) from the 2010 census count of 7,838, which in turn reflected an increase of 556 (+7.6%) from the 7,282 counted in the 2000 census. The township's name is derived from Chester in England.

Periodically recognized as part of the Somerset Hills, Chester Township is located in the Raritan Valley region within the New York Metropolitan area. It is known as the "doughnut" around Chester Borough since it completely surrounds it, making it part of 21 pairs of "doughnut towns" in the state, where one municipality entirely surrounds another.

Located about 40 miles (64 km) west of New York City, Chester Township is a semi-rural residential community known for its agricultural and equestrian farms along with its country estates. The township is characterized by undeveloped, residentially zoned areas that largely contain vast amounts of open space comprised of farmland — much of which is preserved — in addition to public parks.

The township has been one of the state's highest-income communities. Based on data from the 2014–2018 American Community Survey, the township residents had a median household income of $160,625, more than double the statewide median of $79,363. In 2010, Forbes ranked Chester Township at 321st in its listing of "America's Most Expensive ZIP Codes," with a median home price of $823,691.

== History ==
The earliest records of individuals settling in the area date back to deeds dated in 1713, for properties located near a point where two Lenape Native American trails crossed at an area called Black River. With the arrival of the Rogerenes in 1730, the area developed as an agricultural community, producing applejack, flax and wool, as well as raising cattle. The Township was created from portions of Roxbury Township and Washington Township on April 1, 1799, following a local referendum. A burst of economic activity occurred starting in 1875 with the discovery of iron ore in the area, which led to the construction of dozens of mines, a blast furnace and many of the commercial and residential structures in the township date to that era. The discovery of far more abundant and productive mining sites in Minnesota's Mesabi Range ended that boom after nearly 15 years. Chester returned to its farming roots in the 20th Century.

The township was established by an act of the New Jersey Legislature on April 1, 1799, from portions of both Roxbury and Washington Townships, based on the results of a referendum held that day. Additional territories were acquired from Randolph Township (in 1806) and Washington Township (1840 and 1853). Portions of the township were taken on April 3, 1930, to form Chester Borough, a separate municipality surrounded entirely by Chester Township.

== Geography ==
According to the United States Census Bureau, the township had a total area of 29.22 square miles (75.67 km^{2}), including 29.13 square miles (75.45 km^{2}) of land and 0.09 square miles (0.22 km^{2}) of water (0.29%).

Unincorporated communities, localities and place names located partially or completely within the township include Hacklebarney, Horton, Milldale, Milltown, Mount Paul, Pleasant Hill and Upper Ironia.

The township completely surrounds Chester Borough, making it part of 21 pairs of "doughnut towns" in the state, where one municipality entirely surrounds another. The township borders Mendham Township to the east, Randolph and Roxbury to the northeast, Mount Olive to the northwest, and Washington Township to the west, all of which are located in Morris County, while the Somerset County municipalities of Bedminster and Peapack-Gladstone, located in the Somerset Hills lie to the south and Tewksbury Township in Hunterdon County to the southwest.

== Demographics ==
Historical population
| Census | Pop. | Note | %± |
|---|---|---|---|
| 1810 | 1,175 | | — |
| 1820 | 1,212 | | 3.1% |
| 1830 | 1,334 | | 10.1% |
| 1840 | 1,328 | | −0.4% |
| 1850 | 1,334 | | 0.5% |
| 1860 | 1,558 | | 16.8% |
| 1870 | 1,743 | | 11.9% |
| 1880 | 2,337 | | 34.1% |
| 1890 | 1,625 | | −30.5% |
| 1900 | 1,409 | | −13.3% |
| 1910 | 1,251 | | −11.2% |
| 1920 | 1,195 | | −4.5% |
| 1930 | 1,453 | | 21.6% |
| 1940 | 874 | * | −39.8% |
| 1950 | 1,297 | | 48.4% |
| 1960 | 2,107 | | 62.5% |
| 1970 | 4,265 | | 102.4% |
| 1980 | 5,198 | | 21.9% |
| 1990 | 5,958 | | 14.6% |
| 2000 | 7,282 | | 22.2% |
| 2010 | 7,838 | | 7.6% |
| 2020 | 7,713 | | −1.6% |
| 2023 (est.) | 7,706 | | −0.1% |
Population sources:1810–1920 1850–1870 1850; 1870 1880–1890; 1890–1910 1910–1930; 1940–2000 2000; 2010 2020 * = Lost territory in previous decade.

=== 2010 census ===
The 2010 United States census counted 7,838 people, 2,592 households, and 2,201 families in the township. The population density was 266.8 per square mile (103.0/km^{2}). There were 2,697 housing units at an average density of 91.8 per square mile (35.4/km^{2}). The racial makeup was 93.31% (7,314) White, 1.05% (82) Black or African American, 0.03% (2) Native American, 3.50% (274) Asian, 0.01% (1) Pacific Islander, 0.54% (42) from other races, and 1.57% (123) from two or more races. Hispanic or Latino of any race were 4.35% (341) of the population.

Of the 2,592 households, 43.4% had children under the age of 18; 76.5% were married couples living together; 5.6% had a female householder with no husband present and 15.1% were non-families. Of all households, 11.6% were made up of individuals and 5.4% had someone living alone who was 65 years of age or older. The average household size was 3.00 and the average family size was 3.27.

30.0% of the population were under the age of 18, 4.9% from 18 to 24, 16.3% from 25 to 44, 35.6% from 45 to 64, and 13.2% who were 65 years of age or older. The median age was 44.4 years. For every 100 females, the population had 100.0 males. For every 100 females ages 18 and older there were 96.6 males.

The Census Bureau's 2006–2010 American Community Survey showed that (in 2010 inflation-adjusted dollars) median household income was $162,188 (with a margin of error of +/− $17,186) and the median family income was $168,942 (+/− $15,109). Males had a median income of $147,109 (+/− $13,523) versus $67,647 (+/− $9,800) for females. The per capita income for the township was $77,787 (+/− $8,389). About 3.1% of families and 6.2% of the population were below the poverty line, including 11.0% of those under age 18 and 0.9% of those age 65 or over.

Based on data from the 2006–2010 American Community Survey, Chester Township had a per capita income of $77,787 (ranked 16th in the state), compared to per capita income in Morris County of $47,342 and statewide of $34,858.

=== 2000 census ===
As of the 2000 United States census there were 7,282 people, 2,323 households, and 2,014 families residing in the township. The population density was 248.3 inhabitants per square mile (95.9/km^{2}). There were 2,377 housing units at an average density of 81.1 per square mile (31.3/km^{2}). The racial makeup of the township was 95.12% white, 1.15% African American, 0.01% Native American, 2.39% Asian, 0.05% Pacific Islander, 0.26% from other races, and 1.00% from two or more races. Hispanic or Latino of any race were 2.58% of the population.

Of the 2,323 households, 46.0% feature children under the age of 18, 79.6% were married couples living together, 4.9% had a female householder with no husband present, and 13.3% were non-families. Of all households, 10.3% were made up of individuals, and 3.0% had someone living alone who was 65 years of age or older. The average household size was 3.05 and the average family size was 3.29.

In the township the population was spread out, with 30.5% under the age of 18, 4.1% from 18 to 24, 26.5% from 25 to 44, 29.8% from 45 to 64, and 9.1% who were 65 years of age or older. The median age was 40 years. For every 100 females, there were 97.0 males. For every 100 females age 18 and over, there were 93.8 males.

The median income for a household in the township was $117,298, and the median income for a family was $133,586. Males had a median income of $91,841 versus $52,076 for females. The per capita income for the township was $55,353. About 2.4% of families and 2.3% of the population were below the poverty line, including 1.8% of those under age 18 and 2.8% of those age 65 or over.

== Parks and recreation ==
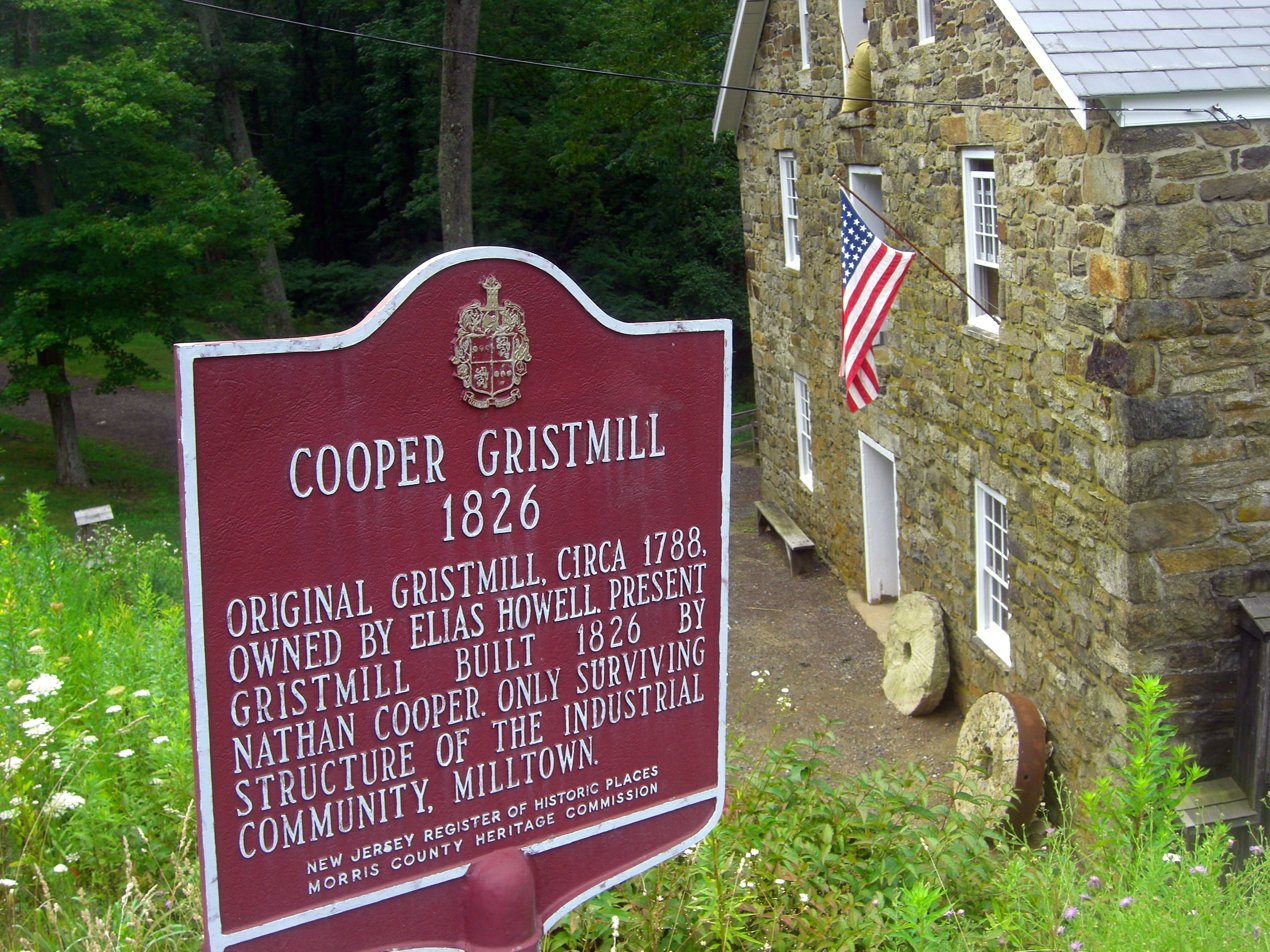
Nathan Cooper Gristmill

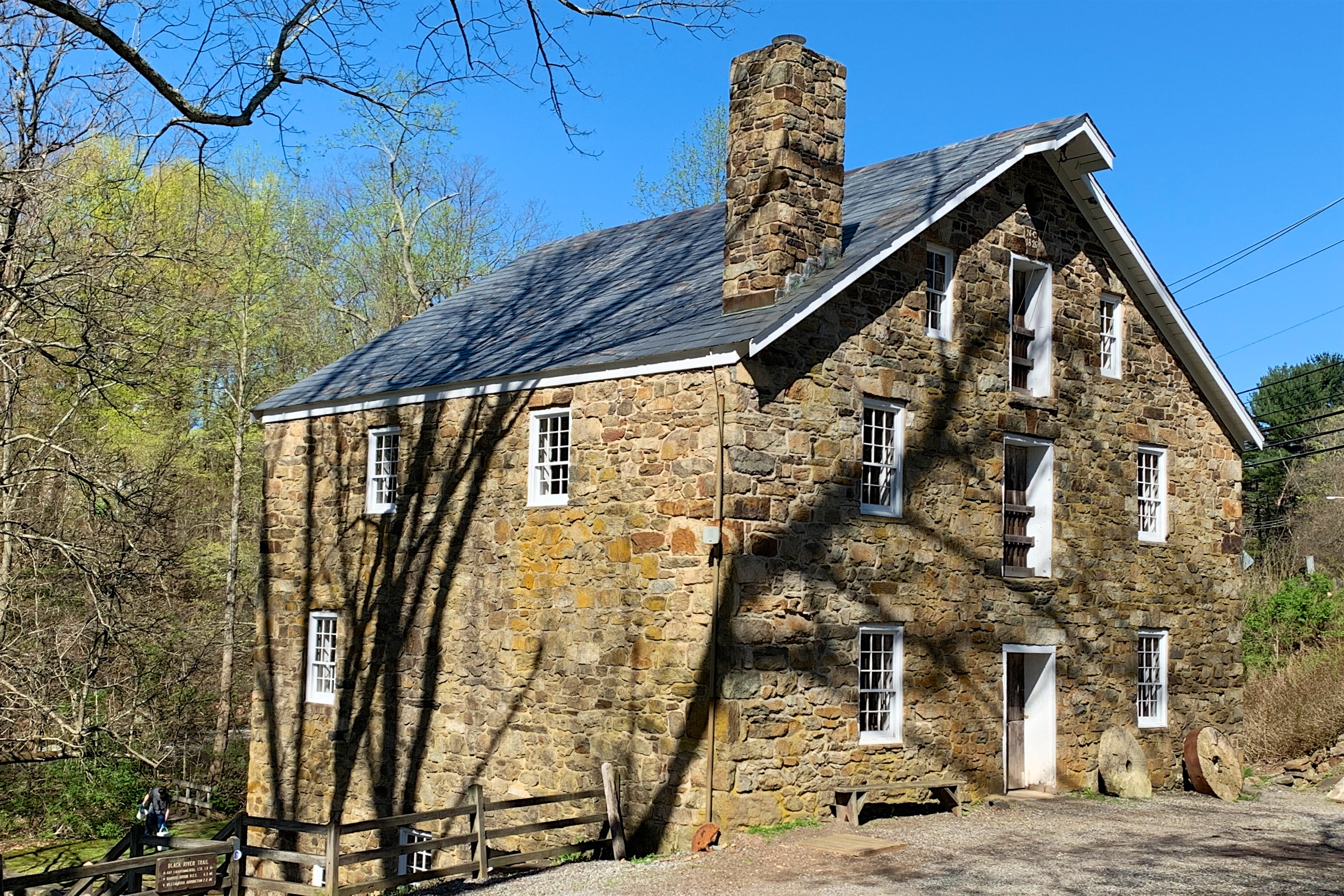
Looking west at Cooper Gristmill at Black River County Park

Of the township's 29.8 square miles (77 km^{2}), 42%, or about 12 square miles (31 km^{2}), is permanently protected from development. There are nature reserves and parkland, but also agricultural property that is deed restricted under the state Farmland Preservation Program, which buys the development rights while allowing the farmer to retain title and continue working the land.

Chester has been described as a rural environment that caters to "agritourism." The township has developed this reputation by preserving farmland through public investment in open spaces.

The township's parks and preserves are free and open to the public. Parks include:

- Chubb Park: An 85-acre (34 ha) area with playing fields, skating, ponds, and sledding.
- Tiger Brook Park: Purchased with the assistance of the New Jersey Green Acres Program in 1980, this 270-acre (1.1 km^{2}) preserve contains a 10-acre (40,000 m^{2}) reservoir.
- Hacklebarney State Park: This 890-acre (360 ha) park was established in 1924 with the donation of 32 acres (130,000 m^{2}). The Black River, which bisects the park, is one of the premier trout fishing streams in New Jersey.
- Black River Fish and Wildlife Management Area: This area consists of 3,020 acres (1,220 ha; 4.72 sq mi) in the northern portion of the Township. It was purchased under the Green Acres Acquisition Program for recreational activities, including fishing, hunting, canoeing, cross-country skiing and hiking.
- Highlands Ridge Park: Former Bell Laboratories Outdoor Research Lab. Site of the 'Telephone Pole Farm' and current headquarters of the New Jersey Highlands Council, a 15-member appointed body tasked with implementation of the New Jersey Highlands Water Protection and Planning Act of 2004.

Development is highly constrained due to state and township ordinances. The entire township is located in the New Jersey Highlands with approximately 86% of the land area designated as part of the more highly constrained Highlands Preservation Area. This environmentally sensitive area supplies drinking water to two-thirds of the state's residents. In 2004, the state passed the Highlands Preservation Act to limit development. In 2005, 27 new homes were built and 16 in 2006.

== Government ==
=== Local government ===
In 1958, Chester Township changed its form of government from the Township form to a Faulkner Act form, Small Municipality, Plan C. The township is one of 18 municipalities (of the 564) statewide that use this form of government, which is available to municipalities with fewer than 12,000 residents at the time of adoption. The governing body is comprised of the mayor and four councilmembers, all elected at-large for three-year terms on a staggered basis as part of the November general election, with two seats coming up for election in consecutive years followed by the mayoral seat in the third year of the cycle. The candidates run on a partisan basis at regular primary and general election times. Independent candidates, having declared their intentions at primary time, run only in the general election.

Chester Township's form of government features a strong mayor, who acts as the township's executive, overseeing the creation of a budget, preparing an annual financial report and the enforcement of state and local laws, and is responsible for hiring most township officials (with approval of the council). The council, which is the township's legislative body, selects one of its members to serve as president to preside when the mayor is not present. The mayor participates and votes in Council sessions and makes committee assignments to Councilmembers. The mayor and a member of the Council serve on the Planning Board.

As of 2026, the Mayor of Chester Township is Republican Timothy Drag, whose term of office ends December 31, 2028. Members of the Chester Township Council are Joseph DiPaolo (R, 2026), Andrew Judd (R, 2026), Tara Schellhorn (R, 2026) and Veronica Heinlein Wood (R, 2028).

==== Merger discussion with Chester Borough ====
In 2007, New Jersey Governor Jon Corzine created incentives for municipalities with less than 10,000 inhabitants to combine with other communities. The goal was to reduce the overall cost of government and thereby offer some tax relief. "New Jersey has 21 counties, 566 municipalities and 616 school districts, and property taxes average $6,800 per homeowner, or twice the national average."

Chester Borough split from Chester Township in 1930 over the creation of sewer and water infrastructure in the more densely settled center of the municipality. The residents of the rural portions of the Township did not wish to financially support the construction and maintenance of a public sewer or water utility. Since that time rural Chester Township has relied upon individual private wells for water and septic systems for wastewater treatment while the Borough is primarily, although not entirely, served by public sewer and water. Concerns over the extension of utilities into the more rural Township with the resultant potential for large scale growth served as an impediment to consolidation. The prohibition of utility extensions supported by the NJ State Plan and codified in the Highlands Water Protection Act, along with the development restrictions contained in the Highlands Act have lessened those concerns. Additionally, an aggressive land conservation program in the Township has resulted in over 40% of the 29-square-mile (75 km^{2}) Township being placed into permanent preservation, further lessening worries about potential overdevelopment. The two municipalities currently share a common K–8 school district, volunteer fire department, library, first aid squad and other municipal services.

Governor Corzine's plan to reduce or eliminate state aid had residents considering recombining towns. The two mayors publicly endorsed a cost/benefit analysis of a merger. However, a merger vote planned for November 2, 2010, was delayed until 2011 due to Governor Christie's elimination of equalization funds that would ensure some taxpayers do not pay more due to the merger, as an analysis by the New Jersey Department of Community Affairs estimated that township residents would see an annual increase of $128 on their property taxes while those in the borough would see an average decline of $570 in their taxes.

=== Federal, state and county representation ===
Chester Township is located in the 7th Congressional District and is part of New Jersey's 24th state legislative district.

For the 119th United States Congress, New Jersey's 7th congressional district is represented by Thomas Kean Jr. (R, Westfield). New Jersey is represented in the United States Senate by Democrats Cory Booker (Newark, term ends 2027) and Andy Kim (Moorestown, term ends 2031).

For the 2026–2027 session, the 24th legislative district of the New Jersey Legislature is represented in the State Senate by Parker Space (R, Wantage Township) and in the General Assembly by Dawn Fantasia (R, Franklin) and Mike Inganamort (R, Chester Township).

Morris County is governed by a Board of County Commissioners comprised of seven members who are elected at-large in partisan elections to three-year terms on a staggered basis, with either one or three seats up for election each year as part of the November general election. Actual day-to-day operation of departments is supervised by County Administrator Deena Leary.

As of 2026, Morris County's Commissioners (with all terms ending December 31) are Director Stephen H. Shaw (R, Mountain Lakes, 2027), Deputy Director John Krickus (R, Washington Township, 2027), Douglas Cabana (R, Boonton Township, 2028), Thomas J. Mastrangelo (R, Montville, 2028), Christine Myers (R, Harding Township, 2028), Tayfun Selen (R, Chatham Township, 2026), and Deborah Smith (R, Denville Township, 2027).

The county's constitutional officers are County Clerk Ann F. Grossi (R, Parsippany–Troy Hills, 2028), Sheriff James M. Gannon (R, Boonton Township, 2025) and Surrogate Heather Darling (R, Roxbury, 2029).

=== Politics ===
United States presidential election results for Chester Township 2024 2020 2016 2012 2008 2004
| Year | Republican | | Democratic | | Third party(ies) | |
| Year | No. | % | No. | % | No. | % |
|---|---|---|---|---|---|---|
| 2024 | 2,650 | 53.97% | 2,180 | 44.40% | 80 | 1.63% |
| 2020 | 2,725 | 52.29% | 2,411 | 46.27% | 75 | 1.44% |
| 2016 | 2,436 | 56.09% | 1,732 | 39.88% | 175 | 4.03% |
| 2012 | 2,579 | 67.18% | 1,235 | 32.17% | 25 | 0.65% |
| 2008 | 2,821 | 62.93% | 1,623 | 36.20% | 39 | 0.87% |
| 2004 | 2,840 | 65.71% | 1,445 | 33.43% | 37 | 0.86% |

As of March 2011, there were a total of 5,435 registered voters in Chester Township, of which 807 (14.8%) were registered as Democrats, 2,608 (48.0%) were registered as Republicans and 2,018 (37.1%) were registered as Unaffiliated. There were 2 voters registered as either Libertarians or Greens.

In the 2012 presidential election, Republican Mitt Romney received 67.2% of the vote (2,579 cast), ahead of Democrat Barack Obama with 32.2% (1,235 votes), and other candidates with 0.7% (25 votes), among the 3,854 ballots cast by the township's 5,757 registered voters (15 ballots were spoiled), for a turnout of 66.9%. In the 2008 presidential election, Republican John McCain received 62.7% of the vote (2,821 cast), ahead of Democrat Barack Obama with 36.1% (1,623 votes) and other candidates with 0.9% (39 votes), among the 4,499 ballots cast by the township's 5,748 registered voters, for a turnout of 78.3%. In the 2004 presidential election, Republican George W. Bush received 65.5% of the vote (2,840 ballots cast), outpolling Democrat John Kerry with 33.3% (1,445 votes) and other candidates with 0.7% (37 votes), among the 4,336 ballots cast by the township's 5,654 registered voters, for a turnout percentage of 76.7.

Gubernatorial election results for Chester Township
| Year | Republican | | Democratic | | Third party(ies) | |
| Year | No. | % | No. | % | No. | % |
|---|---|---|---|---|---|---|
| 2025 | 2,262 | 56.63% | 1,719 | 43.04% | 13 | 0.33% |
| 2021 | 2,136 | 62.93% | 1,232 | 36.30% | 26 | 0.77% |
| 2017 | 1,618 | 62.93% | 905 | 35.20% | 48 | 1.87% |
| 2013 | 2,280 | 81.17% | 488 | 17.37% | 41 | 1.46% |
| 2009 | 2,381 | 70.38% | 628 | 18.56% | 374 | 11.06% |
| 2005 | 1,809 | 68.99% | 752 | 28.68% | 61 | 2.33% |

In the 2013 gubernatorial election, Republican Chris Christie received 81.2% of the vote (2,280 cast), ahead of Democrat Barbara Buono with 17.4% (488 votes), and other candidates with 1.5% (41 votes), among the 2,848 ballots cast by the township's 5,714 registered voters (39 ballots were spoiled), for a turnout of 49.8%. In the 2009 gubernatorial election, Republican Chris Christie received 72.1% of the vote (2,381 ballots cast), ahead of Democrat Jon Corzine with 19.0% (628 votes), Independent Chris Daggett with 8.0% (264 votes) and other candidates with 0.3% (10 votes), among the 3,302 ballots cast by the township's 5,601 registered voters, yielding a 59.0% turnout.

United States Senate election results for Chester Township1
| Year | Republican | | Democratic | | Third party(ies) | |
| Year | No. | % | No. | % | No. | % |
|---|---|---|---|---|---|---|
| 2024 | 2,682 | 56.40% | 2,011 | 42.29% | 62 | 1.30% |
| 2018 | 2,359 | 62.16% | 1,337 | 35.23% | 99 | 2.61% |
| 2012 | 2,459 | 67.48% | 1,151 | 31.59% | 34 | 0.93% |
| 2006 | 1,811 | 66.36% | 858 | 31.44% | 60 | 2.20% |

United States Senate election results for Chester Township2
| Year | Republican | | Democratic | | Third party(ies) | |
| Year | No. | % | No. | % | No. | % |
|---|---|---|---|---|---|---|
| 2020 | 2,937 | 57.01% | 2,169 | 42.10% | 46 | 0.89% |
| 2014 | 1,482 | 67.46% | 675 | 30.72% | 40 | 1.82% |
| 2013 | 1,180 | 68.25% | 537 | 31.06% | 12 | 0.69% |
| 2008 | 2,828 | 68.33% | 1,257 | 30.37% | 54 | 1.30% |

== Education ==
Students in public school for pre-kindergarten through eighth grade attend the Chester School District, together with children from Chester Borough. As of the 2020–21 school year, the district, comprised of three schools, had an enrollment of 1,047 students and 106.1 classroom teachers (on an FTE basis), for a student–teacher ratio of 9.9:1. Schools in the district (with 2020–21 enrollment data from the National Center for Education Statistics) are Dickerson Elementary School with 317 students in grades PreK–2, Bragg Elementary School with 325 students in grades 3–5 and Black River Middle School with 402 students in grades 6–8. Dickerson and Bragg Schools are located on County Route 510, east of Chester Borough; Black River Middle School is on County Route 513 (North Road), north of Chester Borough. As a consolidated school district, all residents in the two constituent municipalities vote for board of education members who represent the entire district, not just the municipality in which they reside.

Students in public school for ninth through twelfth grades in both communities attend West Morris Mendham High School, which serves students from the surrounding Morris County school districts of Chester Borough, Chester Township, Mendham Borough and Mendham Township. The high school is part of the West Morris Regional High School District, which also serves students from Washington Township, who attend West Morris Central High School. As of the 2020–21 school year, the high school had an enrollment of 1,142 students and 91.9 classroom teachers (on an FTE basis), for a student–teacher ratio of 12.4:1. The district's board of education is comprised of nine members who are elected directly by voters to serve three-year terms of office on a staggered basis. The nine seats on the board of education are allocated based on the populations of the constituent municipalities, with two seats assigned to Chester Township.

Gill St. Bernard's School, established in 1900, is a private, nonsectarian, coeducational, college preparatory day school, serving students in pre-kindergarten through twelfth grade, located on a 200-acre (81 ha) campus along the Somerset-Morris county line between Peapack-Gladstone and Chester Township.

== Transportation ==
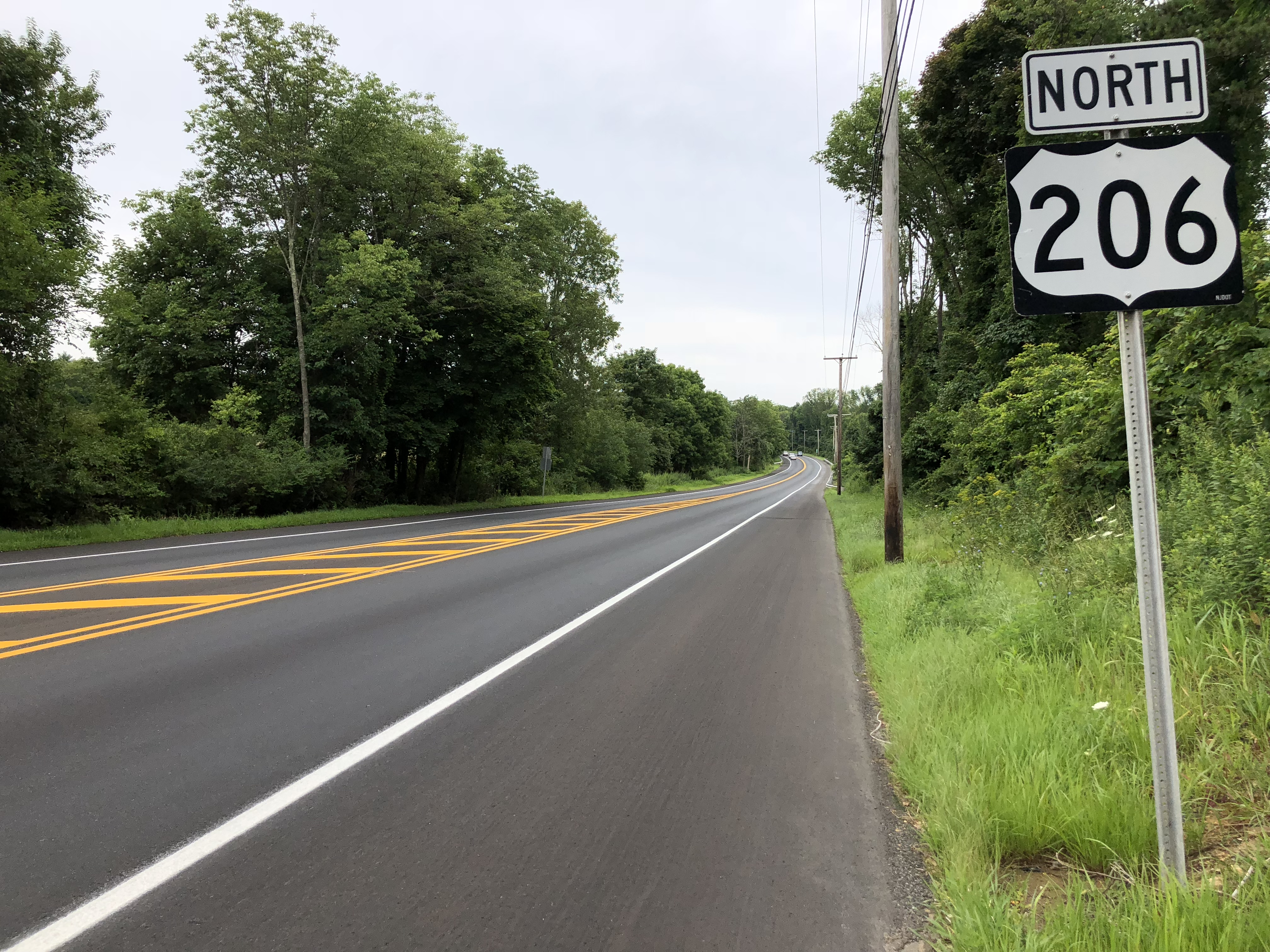
U.S. Route 206 northbound in Chester Township

=== Roads and highways ===
As of May 2010, the borough had a total of 12.06 miles (19.41 km) of roadways, of which 8.37 miles (13.47 km) were maintained by the municipality, 2.58 miles (4.15 km) by Morris County and 1.11 miles (1.79 km) by the New Jersey Department of Transportation.

U.S. Route 206 and CR 513 (otherwise known as Old Route 24 or North Road depending on the area) are the main north–south roads through the township while CR 510 (usually referred to as Old Route 24) acts as the east–west road.

No limited access roads run through Chester, but they are accessible in neighboring communities, such as Interstate 80 in Roxbury and Mount Olive, and both Interstate 287 and Interstate 78 in Bedminster.

=== Public transportation ===
NJ Transit local bus service was provided on the MCM4 and MCM5 routes until June 2010, when NJ Transit pulled the subsidy.

== Notable people ==
People who were born in, residents of, or otherwise closely associated with Chester Township include:

- Ralph Barkman (1907–1998), American football player who played in the NFL for the Orange Tornadoes
- Jim Breuer (born 1967), comedian who resided in the town from 2005 to 2021
- Alex Buzbee (born 1985), defensive end for the Washington Redskins of the NFL
- Robert L. Clifford (1924–2014), associate justice of the New Jersey Supreme Court
- Nathan A. Cooper (1802–1879), landowner and businessman, owner of the Nathan Cooper Gristmill and the General Nathan Cooper Mansion
- John J. Degnan (born 1944), former Attorney General of New Jersey who became Chairman of the Port Authority of New York and New Jersey in 2014
- Louise Fatio (1904–1993), writer of children's books, best known for her picture book The Happy Lion, with her illustrator husband Roger Duvoisin
- James Gandolfini (1961–2013), actor
- Martha Brookes Hutcheson (1871–1959), landscape architect, lecturer and author
- Dave Levey, finalist on Hell's Kitchen
- Rick Porcello (born 1988), pitcher who played for the New York Mets
- William Segal (1904–2000), magazine publisher and self-taught artist whose work often reflected his interest in Eastern philosophies and religions
- Peter Stroud (born 2002), professional soccer player who plays as a midfielder for Major League Soccer club New York Red Bulls
- Michael Yamashita (born 1949), National Geographic photographer and documentary filmmaker
