= West Morris Mendham High School =

High school in Morris County, New Jersey, US

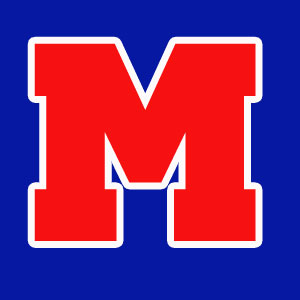

Location
- 65 East Main Street; Mendham Borough, Morris County, New Jersey 07945; United States; 40.7777°N 74.5913°W

Information
- Type: Public high school
- Established: 1970
- Sister school: West Morris Central High School
- School district: West Morris Regional High School District
- Superintendent: Stephen Ryan
- CEEB code: 303850
- NCES School ID: 341755004552
- Principal: Anne Meagher
- Faculty: 82.6 FTEs
- Grades: 9-12
- Enrollment: 1,012 (as of 2024–25)
- Student to teacher ratio: 12.3:1
- Colors: Red; White and Navy Blue
- Athletics conference: Northwest Jersey Athletic Conference (general); North Jersey Super Football Conference (football)
- Team name: Minutemen
- Rivals: West Morris Central High School; Delbarton School; Chatham High School
- Website: www.wmmhs.org

West Morris Mendham High School (also known as Mendham High School) is home of the Minutemen, and is a four-year comprehensive regional public high school that serves students in ninth though twelfth grades as part of the West Morris Regional High School District. Established in 1970, the school is located in the heart of Mendham Borough, in the U.S. state of New Jersey. Students who attend the school come from the Morris County municipalities of Chester Borough, Chester Township, Mendham Borough and Mendham Township.

As of the 2024–25 school year, the school had an enrollment of 1,012 students and 82.6 classroom teachers (on an FTE basis), for a student–teacher ratio of 12.3:1. There were 11 students (1.1% of enrollment) eligible for free lunch and none eligible for reduced-cost lunch.

Its sister school, West Morris Central High School, is located in Washington Township. Students from Washington Township attend West Morris Central. The two schools maintain an athletic rivalry, which has survived decades of conference and schedule changes for all sports. Mount Olive High School was broken off from the original three-school district in 1977.

Mendham was certified to offer the International Baccalaureate (IB) diploma in January 1998. The school was one of 17 high schools in New Jersey to offer the IB diploma program in 2021; along with its sister school West Morris Central, it is one of the two high schools in New Jersey to offer both the IB Diploma and Career Programs.

== Awards, recognition and rankings ==
In its 2013 report on "America's Best High Schools", The Daily Beast ranked the school 284th in the nation among participating public high schools and 22nd among schools in New Jersey. In the 2011 "Ranking America's High Schools" issue by The Washington Post, the school was ranked 5th in New Jersey and 246th nationwide. The school was ranked 562nd, the 13th-highest in New Jersey, in Newsweek magazine's 2010 rankings of America's Best High Schools, with 2.224 AP/IB tests taken per graduating senior. The school was ranked 474th in Newsweek's 2009 ranking of the top 1,500 high schools in the United States and was the 11th-ranked school in New Jersey; The school was ranked 751st nationwide in 2008. In Newsweek's 2007 ranking of the country's top 1,200 high schools, Mendham High School was listed in 390th place, the fourteenth-highest ranked school in New Jersey while Central was ranked 117th in the nation and 3rd in the state. The school was listed in 148th place, the fifth highest ranked school in New Jersey, in Newsweek magazine's May 8, 2006, issue, listing the Top 1,200 High Schools in The United States.

In New Jersey Monthly's September 2018 rankings, West Morris Mendham was ranked 7th public high school in New Jersey out of 305 schools statewide in New Jersey Monthly magazine's September 2018 cover story on the state's "Top Public High Schools", using a new ranking methodology. The school had been ranked 45th in the state of 328 schools in 2012, after being ranked 26th in 2010 out of 322 schools listed. The magazine ranked the school 38th in 2008 out of 316 schools. The school was ranked 29th in the magazine's September 2006 issue, which included 316 schools across the state.

In 2017, the Washington Post ranked West Morris Mendham High School as the most challenging public, non-charter high school in New Jersey and ranked 217th in the nation. Schooldigger.com ranked the school 61st out of 409 public high schools statewide in its 2017 rankings (a decrease of 5 positions from the 2010 ranking) which were based on the combined percentage of students classified as proficient or above proficient on the mathematics (93.4%) and language arts literacy (98.3%) components of the High School Proficiency Assessment (HSPA). Newsweek named the school #180 overall among the nearly 30,000 public high schools in the U.S. in their rankings of "America's Top High Schools 2015" released in August 2015; The school was ranked 38th in New Jersey and 22nd among comprehensive schools in the state.

== Athletics ==
West Morris Mendham High School offers over 30 athletic teams ranging in level from freshman to varsity, competing in the Northwest Jersey Athletic Conference (NJAC), which is comprised of public and private high schools in Morris, Sussex and Warren counties, and was established following a reorganization of sports leagues in Northern New Jersey by the New Jersey State Interscholastic Athletic Association. Prior to the NJSIAA's 2010 realignment, the school had competed as part of the Iron Hills Conference, which included public and private high schools in Essex Morris and Union counties. With 927 students in grades 10-12, the school was classified by the NJSIAA for the 2019–20 school year as Group III for most athletic competition purposes, which included schools with an enrollment of 761 to 1,058 students in that grade range. The football team competes in the Patriot White division of the North Jersey Super Football Conference, which includes 112 schools competing in 20 divisions, making it the nation's biggest football-only high school sports league. The school was classified by the NJSIAA as Group III North for football for 2024–2026, which included schools with 700 to 884 students.

=== Softball ===
The 1985 softball team finished the season with a 26-0 record after winning the Group III state championship by defeating Collingswood High School in the tournament final by a score of 6-0. NJ.com / The Star-Ledger ranked Mendham as their number-one softball team in the state in 1985.

=== Cross country ===
The girls' cross country team won the Group III state championship in 2010, 2012, 2014 and 2015.

The boys' cross country team won the Group III state title in 2011 and 2017-2020.

=== Boys soccer ===
The boys' soccer team won the Group III state championship in 2015 (defeating Toms River High School South in the tournament final) and 2017 (vs. Mainland Regional High School).

The team won the North II Group III state sectional title in 1988, before losing to Steinert High School in the Group III state championship game. In 2015, the Minutemen defeated Toms River High School South by a score of 4-0 in the Group III title game, winning the first state championship in the program's history.

The 2017 team finished the season with a record of 20-3 after defeating Northern Valley Regional High School at Old Tappan by a score of 1-0 in the semifinals and winning the Group III state title with a 2-1 win against Mainland in the championship game at Kean University.

=== Football ===
The 1975 team won the NJSIAA North Jersey II Group I state championship game with a 19–6 win against Mountain Lakes High School, which had been awarded the sectional title in four of the five previous seasons, finishing the season with a record of 8–1–2.

The intra-district football rivalry with West Morris Central High School was ranked 23rd on NJ.com's 2017 list "Ranking the 31 fiercest rivalries in N.J. HS football". With nine consecutive victories, West Morris Central leads the series with an overall record of 27-7-1 through the 2024 season including sectional finals victories in both 2001 and 2004.

=== Boys' lacrosse ===
The varsity boys' lacrosse team was crowned sole state champions in 1994, winning the New Jersey Tournament of Champions against Ridgewood High School. The team won the Group II state championship in 2010 with a win against Princeton High School.

=== Girls' lacrosse ===
The girls' lacrosse team won the Group II state championship in 2007 (defeating Hopewell Valley Central High School in the tournament final), 2008 (vs. Hopewell Valley), and won the Group III title in 2010 (vs. Shawnee High School). The team won the 2007 Group II state title with a 17–4 win against Hopewell Valley in the championship game. The team won the 2008 Group II title, again defeating Hopewell Valley, this time by a score of 8-7 in the championship game. In 2010, the team defeated Shawnee High School by a score of 12–6 in the finals to become the Group III state champions.

=== Girls' volleyball ===
The girls' volleyball team was runner-up in the state in 2007, falling to Fair Lawn High School in the group final. In 2013, the team went on to win the Morris County Tournament, and in 2014, the team was the Northwest Jersey Athletic Conference champions. The girls then went on to win the state championships in 2019 and 2020. The 2019 team won the Group III state title in two seats against Wayne Valley High School.

=== Boys' basketball ===
The team won the Group II state championship in 2000 (defeating Haddonfield Memorial High School in the final game of the tournament) and won the Group III title in 2010 (vs. Kingsway Regional High School).

In 2010, the boys won the Group III state championship with a 44–41 victory over Kingsway Regional, but fell short to University High School in the quarterfinal round of the Tournament of Champions.

The team won the 2011 Morris County Tournament final to give the program its ninth title in the 42-year history of the tournament, more than any other school.

Jim Baglin had a record of 685-192 in his 33 years as coach, from 1979 until 2012, including nine Morris County Tournament titles. He was inducted into the NJSIAA Hall of Fame in 2017.

=== Ice hockey ===
The ice hockey team won the Halvorsen Division title in 2009, 2013, 2014, 2020, and 2022 and won the Haas Cup in 2019.

The 2019 team won the Hass Cup and ran their season record to 21-3 after an 8-1 win in the tournament final played at the Mennen Arena against Park Regional, the co-operative team representing Hanover Park High School and Whippany Park High School.

=== Girls' basketball ===
The team won the Group II state championship in 1998 and 1999, defeating Sterling High School in the tournament final both years.

The team won the program's first state title in 1998 with a 58-40 win against Sterling in the Group II championship game held at the Thomas Dunn Sports Center in Elizabeth. The 1998 team finished with a perfect 32–0 record, after advancing to the Tournament of Champions as the third seed, beating sixth-seed St. Rose High School 54-20 in the first round and number-two St. John Vianney High School 67-55 in overtime in the semifinals before beating previously undefeated Columbia High School in the finals by a score of 67–62, making Mendham the first public school to take the title since 1990.

The team won the Group II state title in 1999 with a 56-51 win against Sterling in the tournament final. and advanced to the Tournament of Champions as the second seed, beating third-seed East Brunswick High School 71-40 in the semifinals before falling to number-one St. John Vianney by a score of 62-53 in the finals to finish the season with a record of 29-2.

=== Girls' soccer ===
The girls' soccer program won the Group II state championship in 1992 (defeating Cinnaminson High School in the tournament final), 1993 (vs. Moorestown High School), 1996 (vs. Ramapo High School), 1998 (as co-champions with Gloucester Catholic High School) and 1999 (vs. Delran High School). The team has won the Iron Hills Conference championship.

The 1999 team finished the season with a 23-1 record after winning the Group II state title with a 2-1 victory in the championship game against a Delran team led by Carli Lloyd.

In 2007, the girls' soccer team won the North II, Group III state sectional championship with a 2-0 win over Scotch Plains High School in the tournament final.

=== Boys' tennis ===
The boys' tennis team won the Group II state championship in 1981 (defeating Gateway Regional High School in the tournament final) and 1982 (vs. Hopewell Valley Central High School).

From 2021 to 2024, the boys' tennis team have been the North 2 Group 2 Sectional.

In 2023, the boys won the Group II Championships, coming down to a second doubles match won by then senior Vincenzo Tarsi and sophomore Anthony Levine in a third-set tiebreak. Final score: 6-2,4-6,7-6(7-1)

That same year, senior Liam Kilmer won NJ Player of the Year, NJAC Player of the Year, 1st Team All State, 1st Team All Group 2, and 1st Team NJAC

=== Girls' tennis ===
The team won the Group III state championship in 2004 (vs. Northern Highlands Regional High School) and 2012 (vs. Princeton High School).

=== Fencing ===
Both the boys' and girls' fencing teams annually place at the top five in the state. In 2011, the girls finished second in the state, and the boys finished fourth. 2009 graduate Emilee Kovolisky placed 4th at the international fencing competition in Barcelona during the summer following her senior year. In 2012, the Mendham boys won the state championship, defeating Columbia High School, which had won the state title the previous two years and had been riding a streak of 49 consecutive dual match victories. The boys fencing team was épée team winner that same year.

=== Field hockey ===
The field hockey team won the North II Group I state sectional championship in 1975 and the North II Group III title in 1993.

=== Wrestling ===
The boys' wrestling team won the North IV Group I state sectional championship in 2017, defeating rival school West Morris Central High School.

=== Track ===
The boys' track team won the indoor relay championship in 2017 as co-champion

=== West Morris Mendham Marching Band ===
The scholastic marching band has participated in competitions such as the Yamaha Cup Competition in 2019.

== Academics ==
The West Morris Regional High School District offers four different levels of classes.

- Studies
- Academic
- Advanced
- Honors / Advanced Placement (AP) / International Baccalaureate (IB)

Each of the four levels in classes differs in the level of rigor, with studies being the least rigorous and Honors/AP/IB being the most rigorous. Students and their parents are free to decide the level of the students classes.

== Administration ==
Anne Meagher took over as principal following Steve Ryan's promotion to chief school administrator in the West Morris Regional High School District, promoted from an assistant principal's position. The core administration team includes two assistant principals.

== Notable alumni ==
- Jim Collins (born 1958, class of 1976), former NFL player
- Molly Creamer (born 1981, class of 1999), former WNBA player
- Maggie Doyne (born c. 1987), philanthropist who helped develop an orphanage and school in the Kopila Valley of Nepal
- Alice Weaver Flaherty, neurologist, who is a researcher, educator and author of the 2004 book The Midnight Disease: The Drive to Write, Writer's Block, and the Creative Brain, about the neural basis of creativity
- Matt Flanagan (born 1995, class of 2013), former tight end for the Washington Football Team and Jacksonville Jaguars
- Doug Root (born 1977), former professional tennis player
- Daniel Tamburello (born 1975, class of 1993), member of the New Hampshire House of Representatives since 2010
- Carl Zander (born 1963, class of 1981), former NFL player who played for the Cincinnati Bengals from 1985-1991
- Adam Zeis (born 1978), writer and podcaster who serves as the managing editor of TheStreamable.com
