= Combs Hollow Historic District =

Historic district in New Jersey, United States

- U.S. National Register of Historic Places
- U.S. Historic district
- New Jersey Register of Historic Places
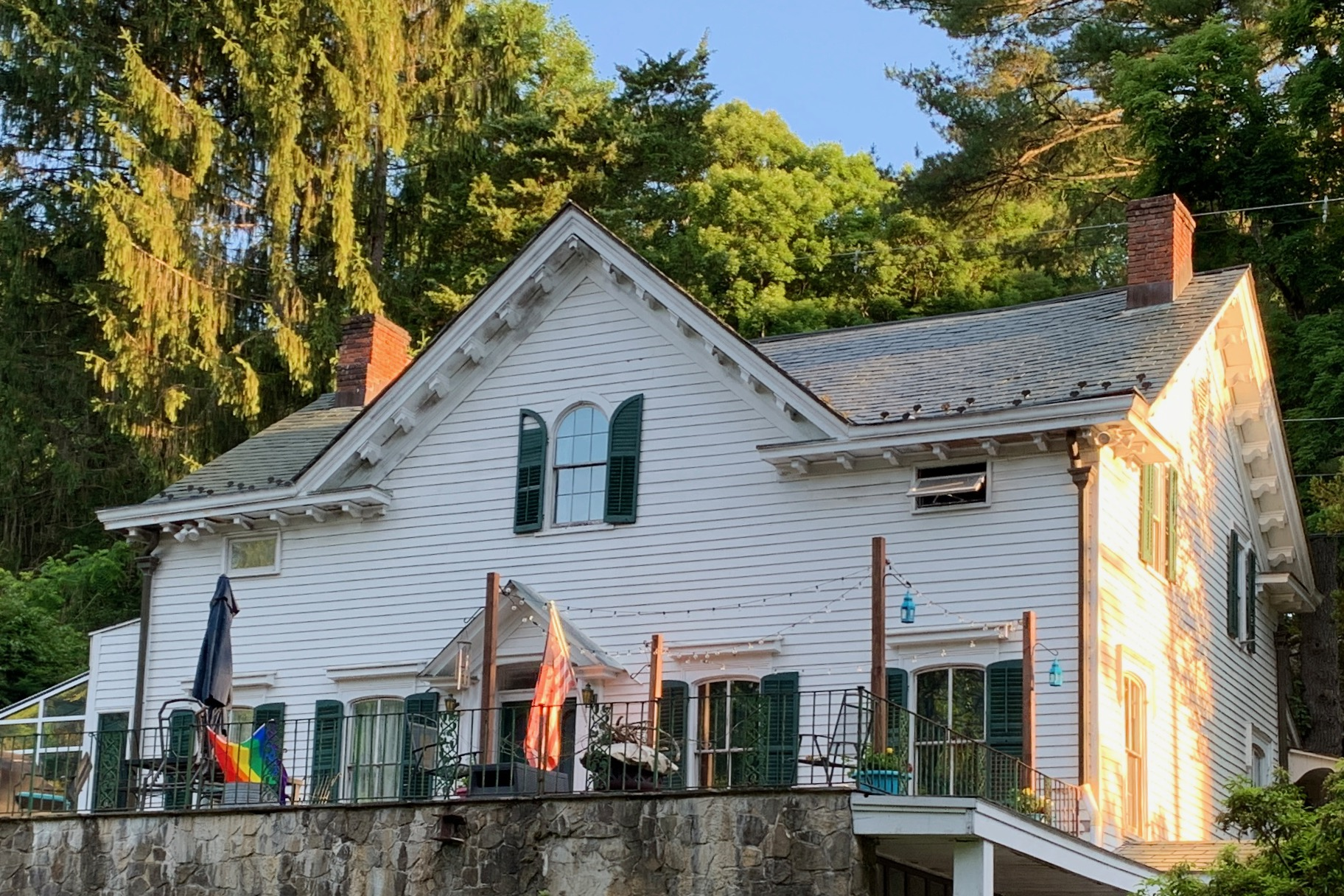
- McIlrath–Lorey House

- Location within Morris County, New Jersey Location within New Jersey Location within the United States
- Location: Junction of Combs Avenue and Combs Hollow Road, south of Doby Road, Randolph, New Jersey, Mendham Township, New Jersey
- Coordinates: 40°48′40″N 74°36′35″W
- Area: 230 acres (93 ha)
- Architectural style: East Jersey Cottage
- NRHP reference No.: 96000042
- NJRHP No.: 3396

Significant dates
- Added to NRHP: February 16, 1996
- Designated NJRHP: December 11, 1995

The Combs Hollow Historic District is a historic district in Randolph, Morris County, New Jersey and extending into Mendham Township. The district was added to the National Register of Historic Places on February 16, 1996, for its significance in industry from c. 1735 to 1927. It includes 11 contributing buildings, 4 contributing structures, and 14 contributing sites.

== Gallery of contributing properties ==
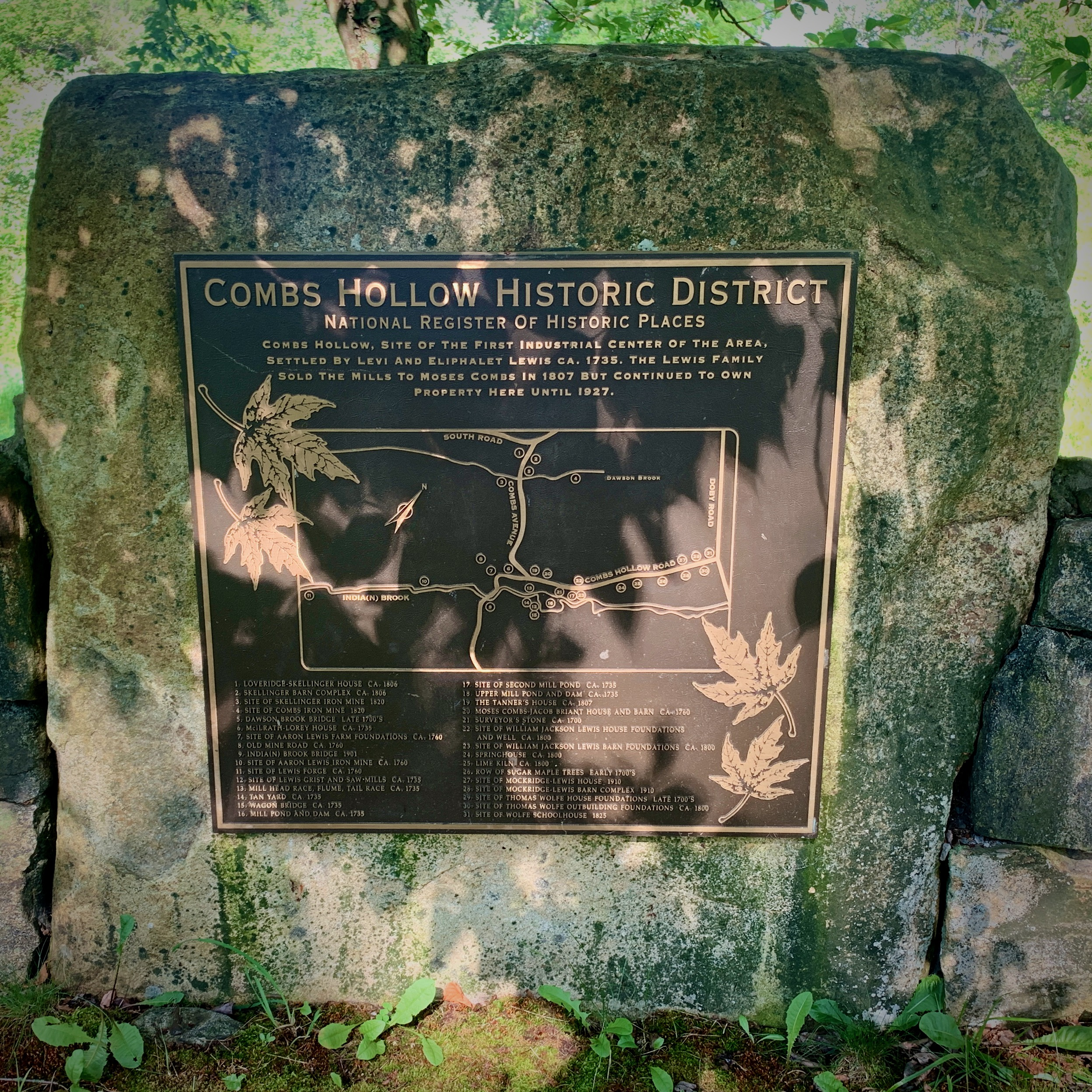
NRHP plaque with map of district

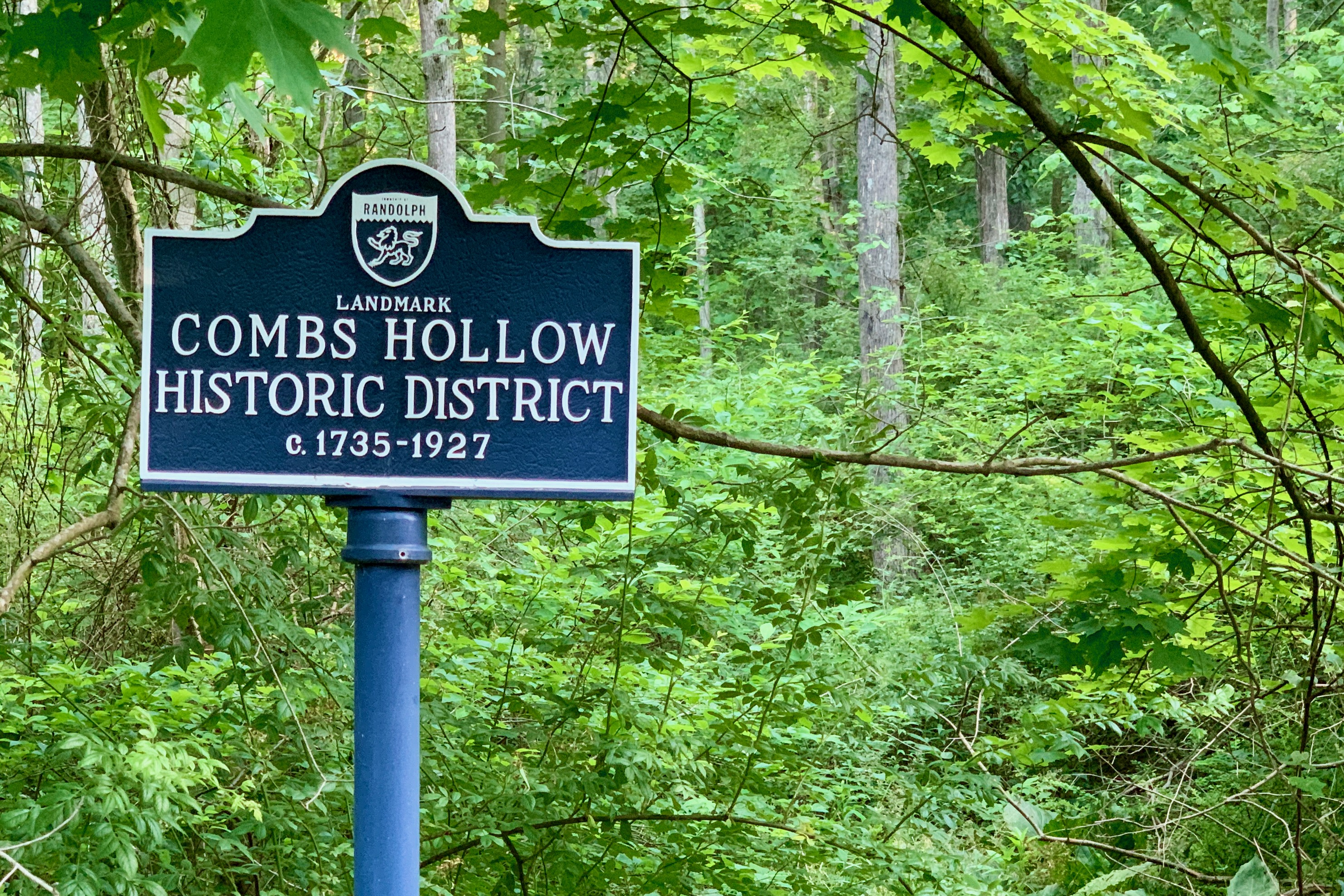
District information sign

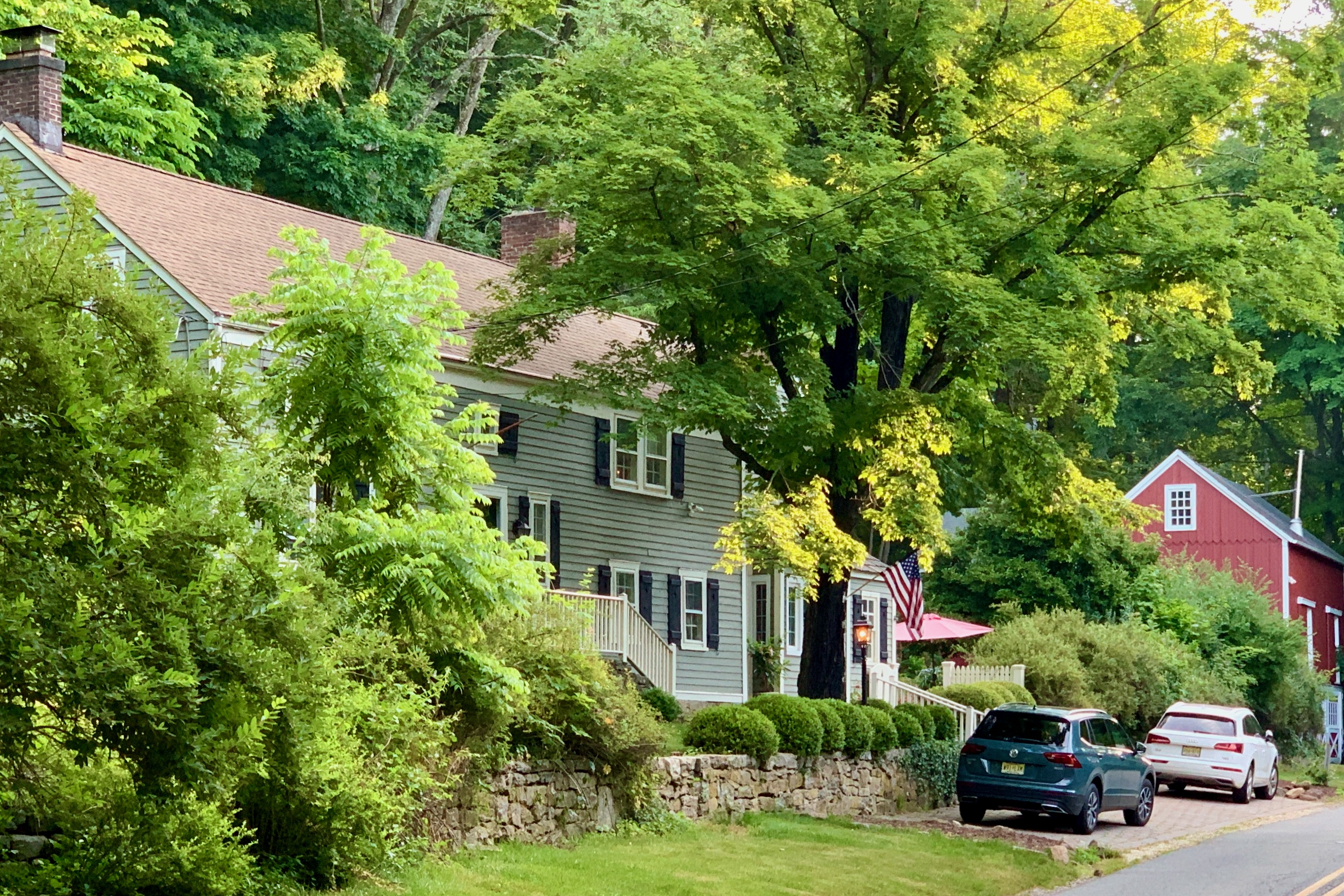
House and barn on Combs Hollow Road

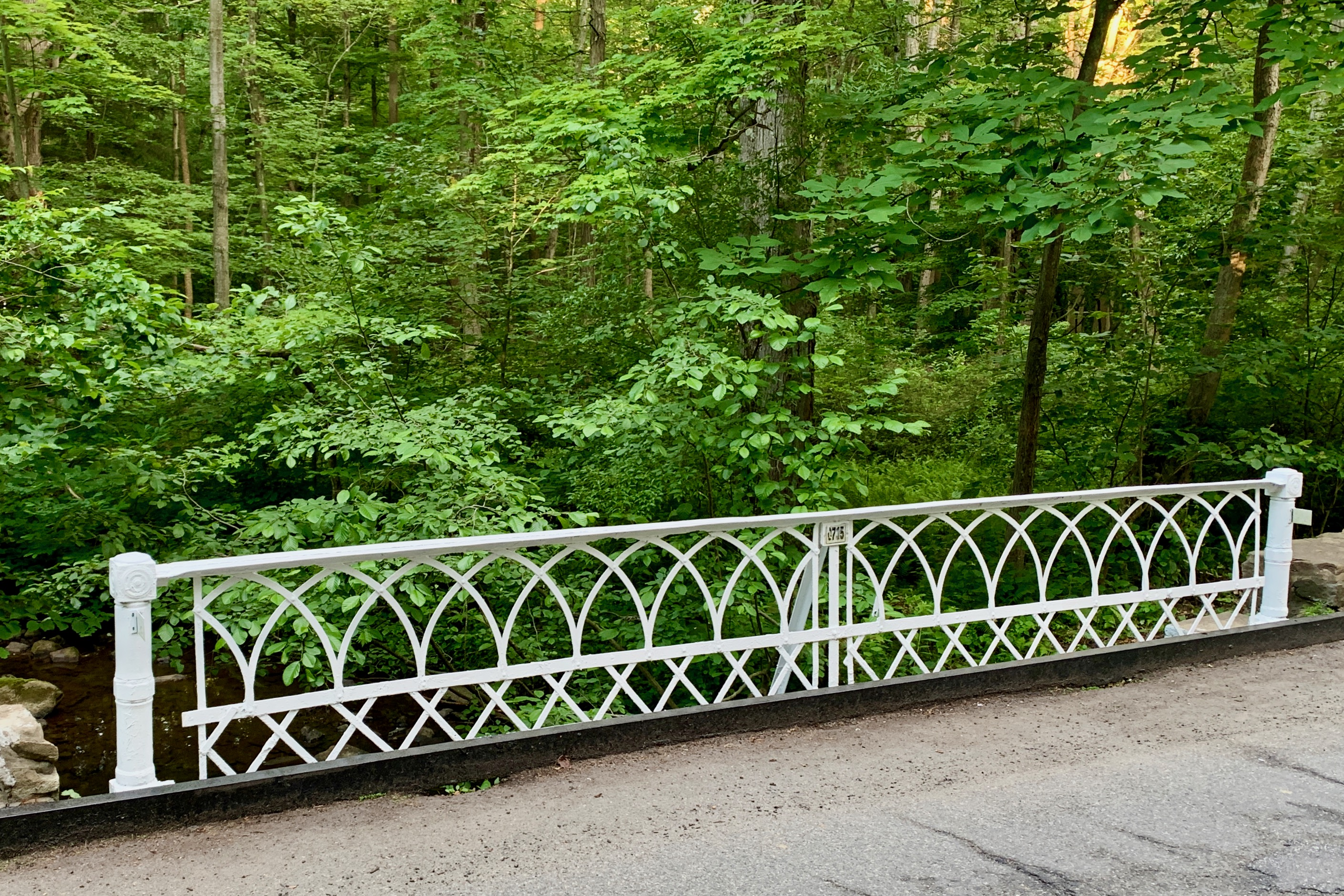
Interlocking Gothic arches on bridge over India Brook

== See also ==
- National Register of Historic Places listings in Morris County, New Jersey
