= Bob Van Dillen =

American television meteorologist

Robert S. Van Dillen (born October 6, 1972), occasionally known as Bob Van Dillen, is an American meteorologist currently working at FOX Weather as on-air host of, regularly, America's Weather Center (Weekdays - 12PM-3PM ET).

He was born in Montclair, New Jersey. He moved to the Shongum Lake section of Randolph, New Jersey, in 1977 and graduated in 1991 from Randolph High School.

Van Dillen earned a Bachelor of Science degree in meteorology from Millersville University of Pennsylvania. He began his career in Long Island, New York, as a forecaster for the Metro Weather Service. He subsequently worked for ABC affiliate WUTR in Utica, New York, CBS affiliate WTVH in Syracuse, New York, and NBC affiliate WCNC-TV in Charlotte, North Carolina. He began working at CNN world headquarters in Atlanta in September 2002.

Van Dillen was awarded the American Meteorological Society (AMS) Seal of Approval in March 1997 and is a full member of the AMS.

On September 27, 2024, Van Dillen rescued a woman trapped in floodwaters from Hurricane Helene while live on camera.
