= Gottesman RTW Academy =

Jewish day school in New Jersey, U.S.

Location
- 146 Dover Chester Road; Randolph, NJ 07869
- 40.8540°N 74.5963°W

Information
- Type: Jewish day school
- Religious affiliation: Judaism
- Faculty: 14.5 (on FTE basis)
- Grades: Prek-8
- Enrollment: 135 (in K-8 as of 2013-14, plus 50 in preK)
- Student to teacher ratio: 9.6:1
- Website: School website

Gottesman RTW Academy (formerly Nathan Bohrer Abraham Kaufman Hebrew Academy of Morris County) is a coeducational Jewish day school located on Dover Chester Road in Randolph, New Jersey serving approximately 225 children in nursery school through grade eight. The school serves the Jewish community of Morris County, New Jersey, along with students from Sussex County and Warren County.

As a community day school, the school accepts students from all branches of Judaism. As of 2006, GRTWA is a member of RAVSAK, a transliterated acronym from Hebrew which in English means Jewish Community Day School Network, having previously been affiliated with the Solomon Schechter Day School Association.

As of the 2013-14 school year, the school had 135 students in kindergarten through eighth grade (plus 50 students in pre-K, for a total enrollment of 185) and 14.5 classroom teachers (on an FTE basis), for a student–teacher ratio of 9.6:.

Since 2007, the Head of School has been Dr. Moshe Vaknin.In 2026, Moshe Vaknin announced his retirement.

== History ==
The Hebrew Academy of Morris County opened in 1967 with 18 children at the Morristown Jewish Center in Morristown. The school opened its current facility in Randolph in September 1980.

The school was renamed Gottesman RTW Academy in March 2014, recognizing a $15 million contribution from Paula and Jerry Gottesman, with "RTW" recognizing the school's founding Rubenstein, Turner and Wertheimer families.That same year a new building was built doubling the size of the previous facility.

== Awards and recognition ==
For the 2006–07 school year, the Hebrew Academy of Morris County was one of four schools in New Jersey—and the only non-public school—recognized with the Blue Ribbon Award from the United States Department of Education, the highest honor that an American school can receive.
