= Brendan Mahon =

American football player (born 1995)

No. 63
- Position: Guard

Personal information
- Born: January 17, 1995 (age 31); Livingston, New Jersey, U.S.
- Listed height: 6 ft 4 in (1.93 m)
- Listed weight: 320 lb (145 kg)

Career information
- High school: Randolph (Randolph, New Jersey)
- College: Penn State
- NFL draft: 2018: undrafted

Career history
- Carolina Panthers (2018)

Career NFL statistics
- Games played: 2
- Stats at Pro Football Reference

Robert Brendan Mahon (born January 17, 1995) is an American former professional football player who was a guard in the National Football League (NFL). He played college football for the Penn State Nittany Lions.

== Early life ==
Mahon was born in Livingston, New Jersey, and grew up in nearby Randolph, where he attended Randolph High School. Mahon was a standout offensive lineman for the Rams, where he was an all-state selection as a junior and senior as well as being ranked in the ESPN 300 and the 4th-best college football prospect in New Jersey. Following his senior season, he was selected to play in the 2013 U.S. Army All-American Bowl and was a team captain in the game.

== College career ==
Mahon played four seasons with the Nittany Lions, appearing 46 games (41 starts). Mahon moved from left to right tackle during his junior season and was named first-team All-Big Ten by Pro Football Focus. As a senior, Mahon received the Richard Maginnis Memorial Award as Penn State's most outstanding offensive lineman.

== Professional career ==
Mahon signed with the Carolina Panthers as an undrafted free agent on April 28, 2018, and made the 53-man roster out of training camp. He made his NFL debut on September 16, 2018, against the Atlanta Falcons. He played in two games before being placed on injured reserve on December 6, 2018, with a concussion.

On June 5, 2019, the Panthers waived Mahon.
