= Brookside, New Jersey =

Place in Morris County, New Jersey, United States

- Census-designated place
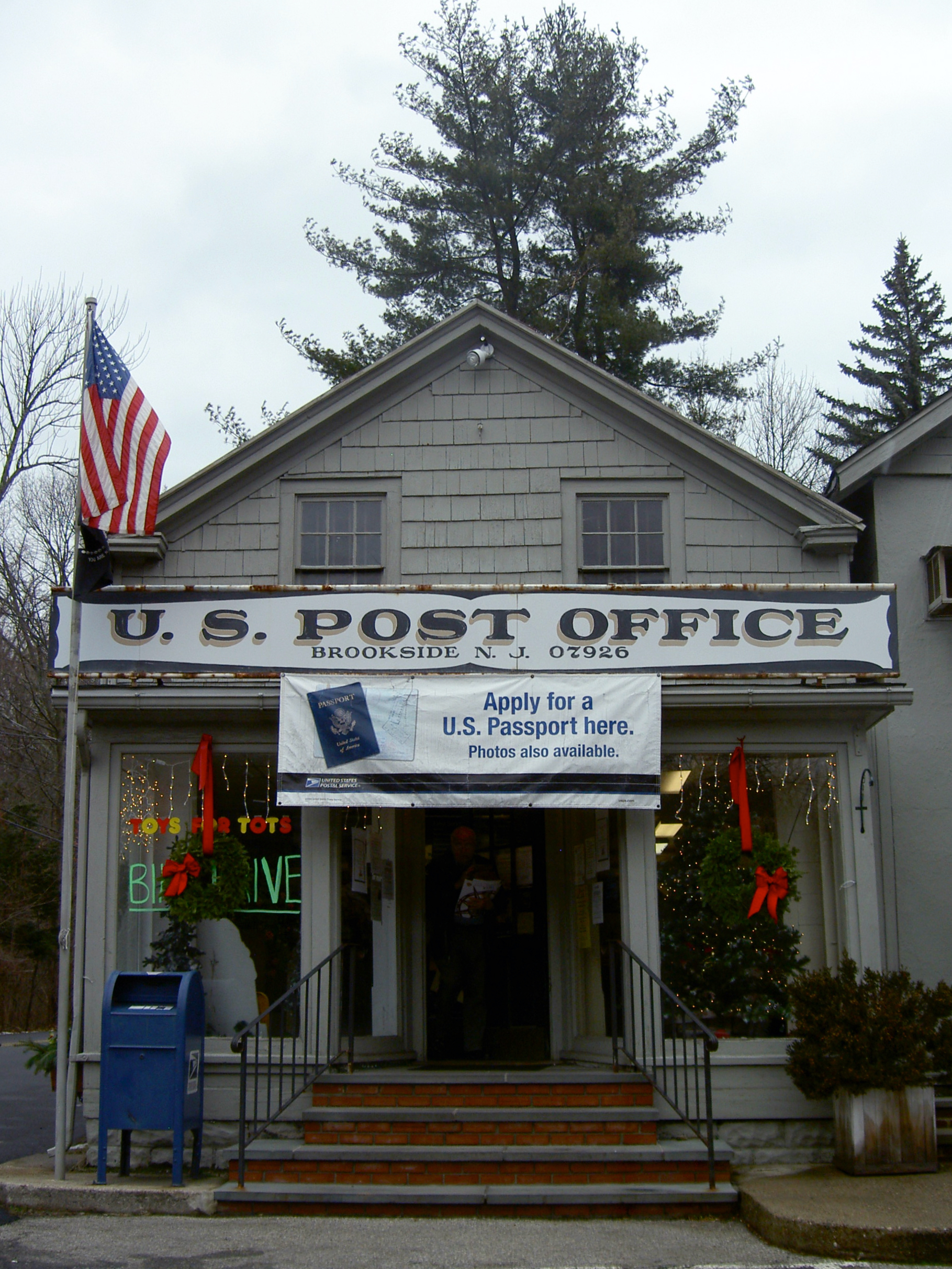
- Brookside Post Office

- Location in Morris County Location in New Jersey Location in the United States
- Coordinates: 40°47′39″N 74°34′05″W
- Country: United States
- State: New Jersey
- County: Morris
- Township: Mendham

Area
  - Total: 2.42 sq mi (6.26 km^{2})
  - Land: 2.40 sq mi (6.22 km^{2})
  - Water: 0.015 sq mi (0.04 km^{2})
- Elevation: 420 ft (130 m)

Population (2020)
  - Total: 1,767
  - Density: 735.3/sq mi (283.92/km^{2})
- Time zone: UTC−05:00 (Eastern (EST))
  - Summer (DST): UTC−04:00 (EDT)
- ZIP Code: 07926 (Brookside); 07945 (Mendham); 07960 (Morristown)
- Area code: 973
- FIPS code: 34-08260
- GNIS feature ID: 2806058

Brookside (once called Waterstreet) is a historic unincorporated community and census-designated place (CDP) located within Mendham Township in Morris County, in the U.S. state of New Jersey. It is located approximately 6 mi (9.7 km) west of Morristown, the county seat.

In the Forbes magazine 2009 ranking of the Most Expensive ZIP Codes in the United States, Brookside was ranked as the 10th most expensive in the country, with its median home sale price of $3,121,115.

It was first listed as a CDP in 2020 census with a population of 1,767.

== Historic district ==
- Brookside Historic District
- U.S. National Register of Historic Places
- U.S. Historic district
- New Jersey Register of Historic Places
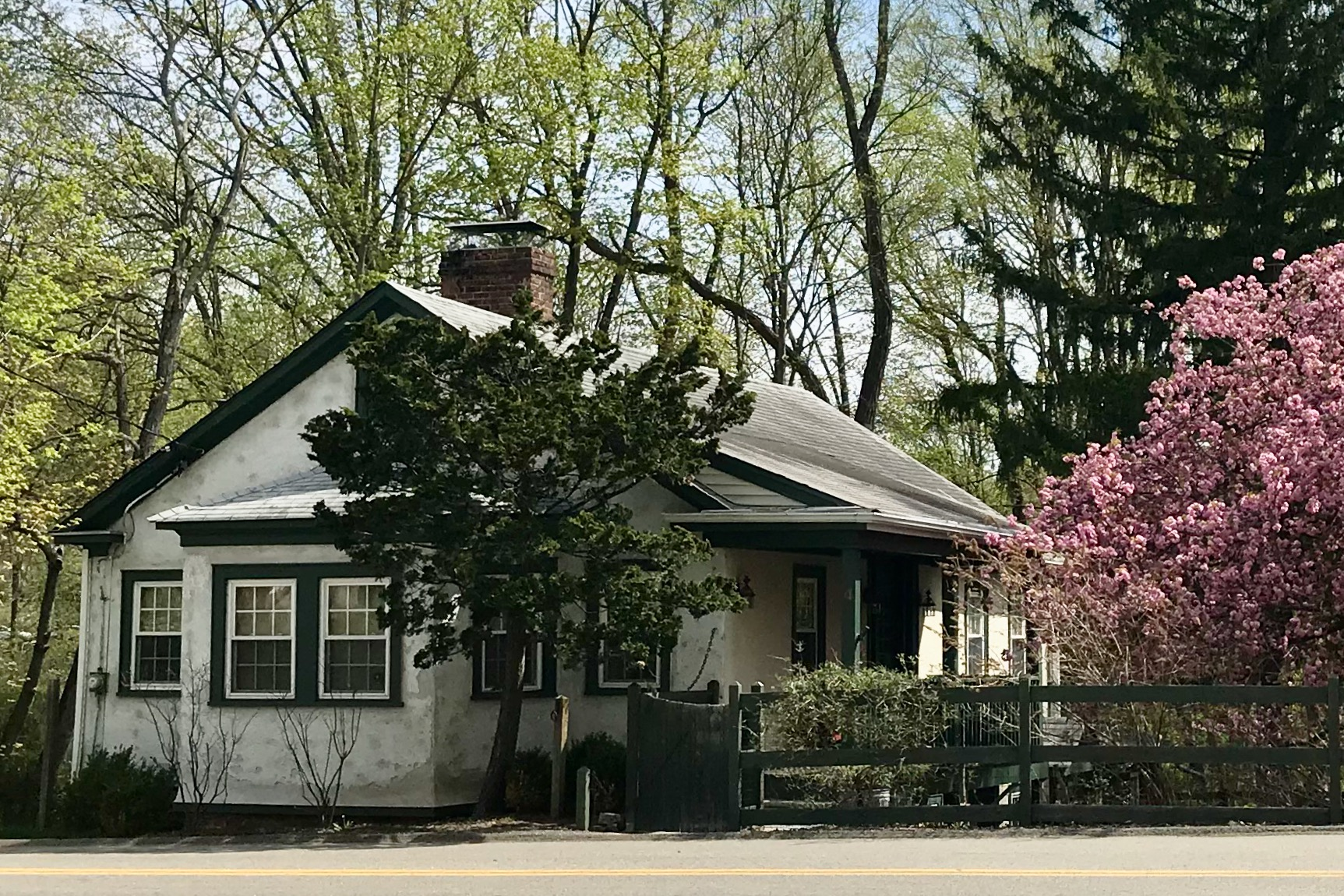
- Location: Bounded by Tingley Road, E. and W. Main Streets, Cold Hill Road and Cherry Lane
- Area: 239 acres (97 ha)
- Architectural style: Bungalow/craftsman, Colonial Revival, Colonial
- NRHP reference No.: 96000041
- NJRHP No.: 3385

Significant dates
- Added to NRHP: February 16, 1996
- Designated NJRHP: December 8, 1995

The Brookside Historic District is a historic district encompassing the village. The district was added to the National Register of Historic Places on February 16, 1996, for its significance in architecture, industry, and community development from 1780 to 1942. It includes 114 contributing buildings, six contributing structures, and eight contributing sites.

== Geography ==
Brookside is in southern Morris County, in the eastern part of Mendham Township. It is bordered to the west by Mendham Borough and to the east by Morris Township. New Jersey Route 24 (Mendham Road) forms the southern edge of the Brookside CDP, and leads west into Mendham and east to Morristown.

According to the U.S. Census Bureau, the Brookside CDP has an area of 2.42 square miles (6.27 km^{2}), of which 0.01 square miles (0.03 km^{2}), or 0.58%, are water. The Whippany River, an east-flowing tributary of the Passaic River, runs through the center of Brookside. It is joined from the north by Harmony Brook in the center of town.

== Culture ==
The yearly "Brookside 4th of July" Parade, sponsored by the Community Club, has been a communal event since 1923. It includes floats made by community groups and families, a lawnmower brigade, fire departments and ambulance squads from all over the region, farm animals, a pooch parade, and both rock and marching bands. It starts at 9 am from the intersection of Dogwood Drive and Tingley Road, then down East Main Street to the Community Club Field where food, games, and activities for people of all ages await.

The Annual Clam Bake, sponsored by the Brookside Engine Company #1, is also held at the Community Club Field on the second Saturday in September. Other events and programs are often offered by the Mendham Township Library, located on the 1st floor of the municipal building on West Main Street in Brookside. The library website and bulletin board in town hall usually contain a list of events and contact information to RSVP.

A picture of the post office is featured on the first edition cover of American Pastoral.

== Demographics ==
Historical population
Census	Pop.	Note	%±
2020	1,767		—
U.S. Decennial Census; 2020

Brookside first appeared as a census designated place in the 2020 U.S. census.

=== 2020 census ===
Brookside CDP, New Jersey – Racial and ethnic composition Note: the US Census treats Hispanic/Latino as an ethnic category. This table excludes Latinos from the racial categories and assigns them to a separate category. Hispanics/Latinos may be of any race.
Race / Ethnicity (NH = Non-Hispanic)	Pop 2020	% 2020
White alone (NH)	1,537	86.98%
Black or African American alone (NH)	12	0.68%
Native American or Alaska Native alone (NH)	0	0.00%
Asian alone (NH)	50	2.83%
Native Hawaiian or Pacific Islander alone (NH)	0	0.00%
Other race alone (NH)	15	0.85%
Mixed race or Multiracial (NH)	72	4.07%
Hispanic or Latino (any race)	81	4.58%
Total	1,767	100.00%

As of the 2010 United States census, the 07926 ZIP Code Tabulation Area for Brookside had a population of 120.

== Education ==
Mendham Township Public Schools are located in Brookside.

== Notable people ==
People who were born in, residents of, or otherwise closely associated with Brookside include:

- Peter Dinklage (born 1969), actor and film producer
- Alice Weaver Flaherty (born 1963), neurologist and writer
- Morris Frank (1908–1980), cofounder of The Seeing Eye, the first guide-dog school in the United States
- Stewart G. Pollock (born 1932), Justice of the Supreme Court of New Jersey from 1979 to 1999
- Joachim Prinz (1902–1988), German-American rabbi and activist, who was an outspoken Zionist and a leader in the US civil rights movement in the 1960s

== See also ==
- National Register of Historic Places listings in Morris County, New Jersey
