= Randolph, New Jersey =

Township in Morris County, New Jersey, US

- Township
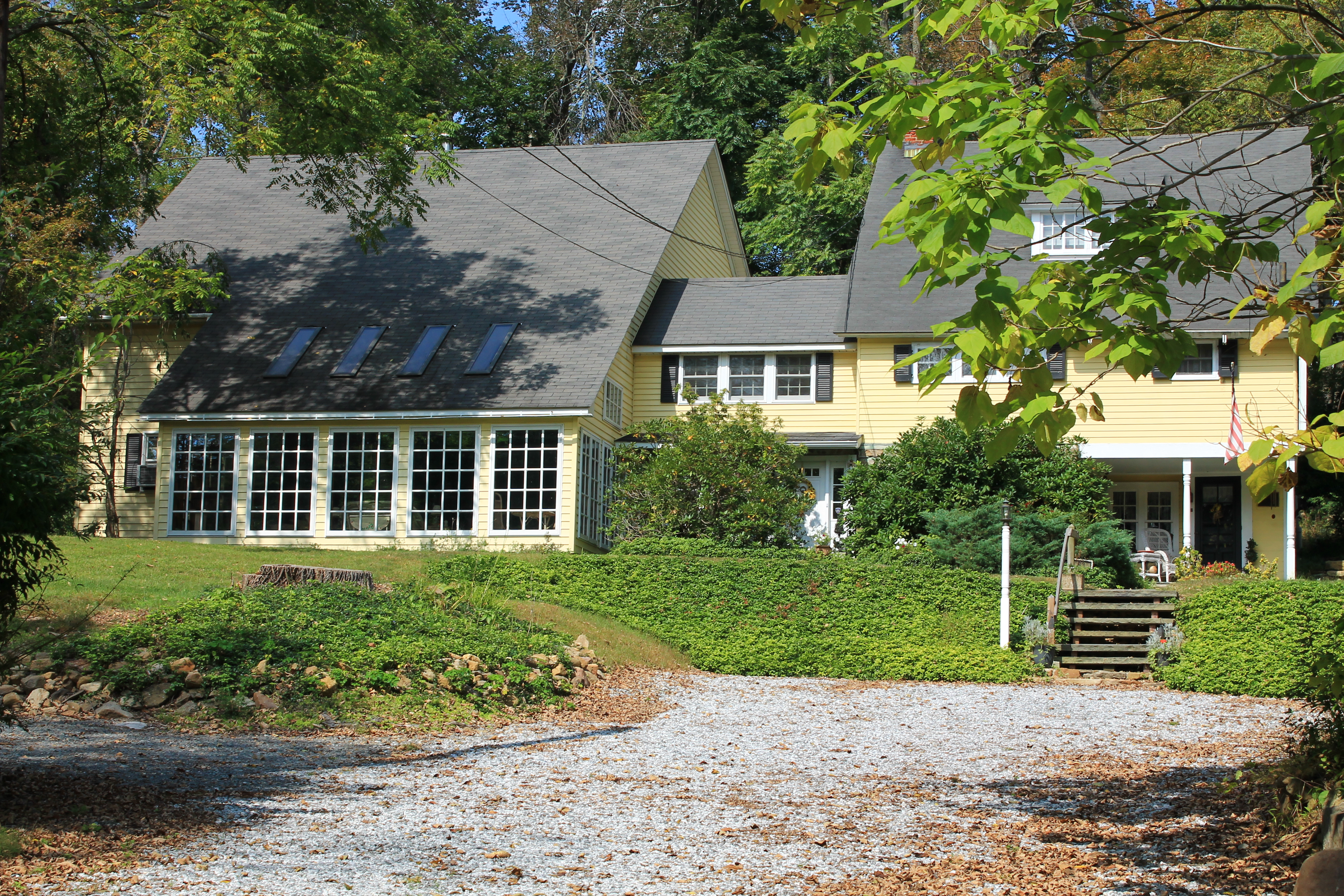
- David Tuttle Cooperage

- Seal
- Motto: Where Life is Worth Living
- Interactive map of Randolph, New Jersey
- Location in Morris County Location in New Jersey Location in the United States
- Coordinates: 40.84164°N 74.578522°W
- Country: United States
- State: New Jersey
- County: Morris
- Incorporated: January 1, 1806

Government
  - Type: Faulkner Act (council–manager)
  - Body: Township Council
  - Mayor: Mark H. Forstenhausler (R, term ends December 31, 2026)
  - Manager: Gregory V. Poff II
  - Municipal clerk: Donna Luciani

Area
  - Total: 21.16 sq mi (54.81 km^{2})
  - Land: 20.90 sq mi (54.14 km^{2})
  - Water: 0.26 sq mi (0.67 km^{2}) 1.22%
  - Rank: 133rd of 565 in state 8th of 39 in county
- Elevation: 994 ft (303 m)

Population (2020)
  - Total: 26,504
  - Estimate (2023): 26,547
  - Rank: 97th of 565 in state 3rd of 39 in county
  - Density: 1,267.8/sq mi (489.5/km^{2})
  - Rank: 355th of 565 in state 24th of 39 in county
- Time zone: UTC−05:00 (Eastern (EST))
  - Summer (DST): UTC−04:00 (Eastern (EDT))
- ZIP Code: 07869 – Randolph; 07845 – Ironia; 07970 – Mount Freedom
- Area code: 973
- FIPS code: 3402761890
- GNIS feature ID: 0882201
- Website: www.randolphnj.org

Randolph is a township in southwestern Morris County, in the U.S. state of New Jersey. As of the 2020 United States census, the township's population was 26,504, an increase of 770 (+3.0%) from the 2010 census count of 25,734, which in turn reflected an increase of 887 (+3.6%) from the 24,847 counted in the 2000 census.

According to the 2020 Census, Randolph was the 3rd most-populous municipality in Morris County and its 21 square miles (54 km^{2}) land area was the eighth-largest in the county. The New Jersey State Planning Commission designates Randolph as half rural, half suburban. The community maintains a diverse population of nearly 26,000 residents.

In 2013, in the Coldwell Banker edition of “Best Places to Live in New Jersey for Booming Suburbs,” Randolph was the number one ranked town in Morris County and fourth overall in the state citing "job growth, high percentage of home ownership, good schools, access to local shopping and community safety." Niche.com ranked Randolph amongst the Top 50 in its 2019 rankings of the "Best Places to Live" in New Jersey.

Established in 1968, the County College of Morris is located on more than 220 acres (89 ha) in the northern part of the township along Route 10.

== History ==
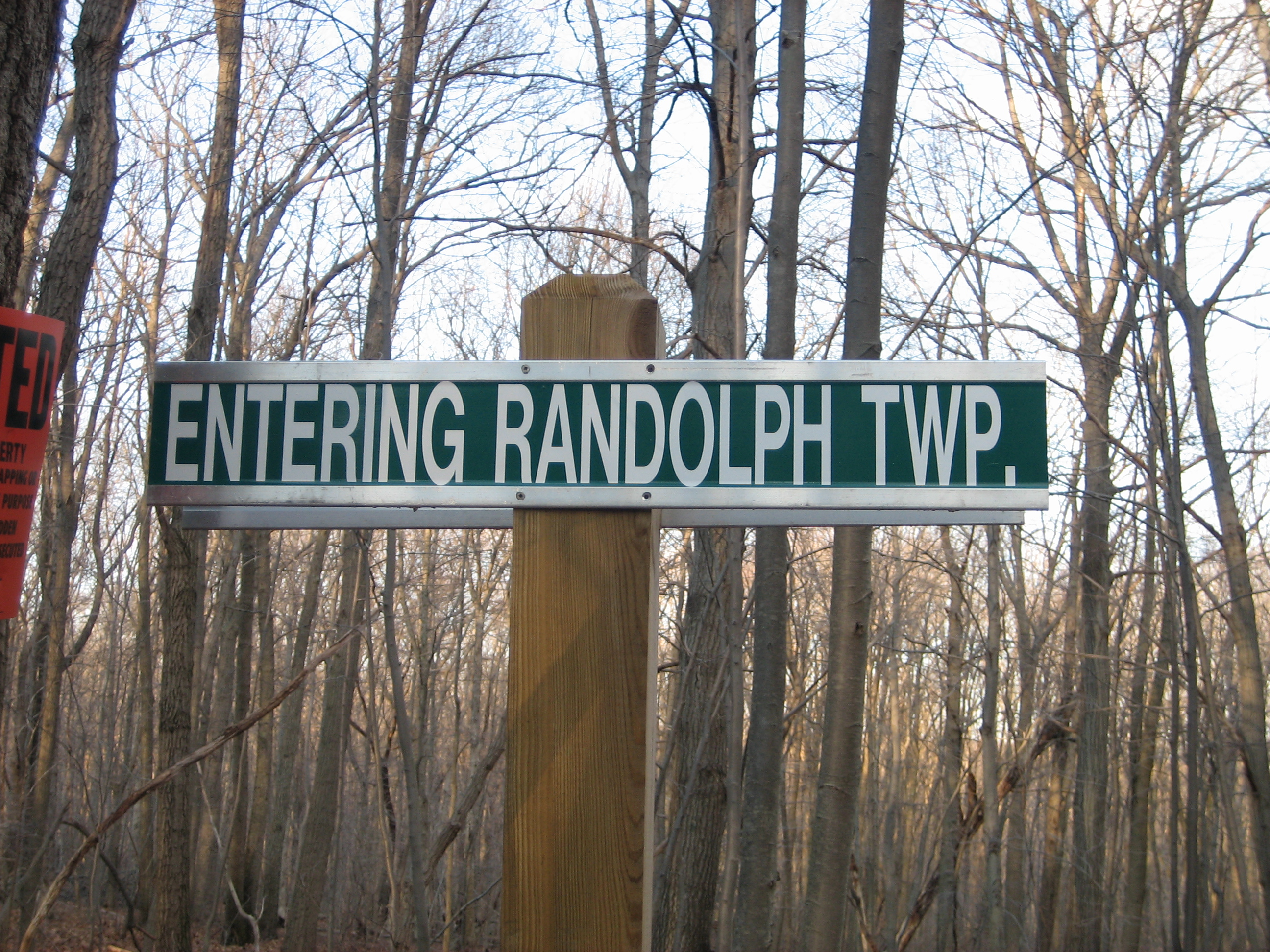
Entering Randolph on Patriots Path

The earliest known inhabitants of what is now Randolph were the Lenni Lenape Native Americans. The earliest European settlers of what is now Randolph were Quakers and one of the pioneering landowners was Hartshorne Fitz-Randolph, who purchased 1,000 acres (4.0 km^{2}) of what would become the township in the Mine Hill area in 1753, later becoming the namesake of the township. New Jersey's first iron mine was established in Randolph in 1713, and for hundreds of years the mines fostered the development of the township, providing the raw materials for weapons used by the Continental Army during the American Revolutionary War. During the war, this area was a supply point for George Washington's army during their winter encampment in nearby Jockey Hollow.

Randolph was incorporated as a township by an act of the New Jersey Legislature on January 1, 1806, from portions of Mendham Township. Portions of the township were taken on April 1, 1869, to create Dover Town within the township, which became an independent municipality as of March 5, 1896. Other portions of the township were taken to create Port Oram (June 26, 1895, now Wharton), Mine Hill Township (March 2, 1923) and Victory Gardens (June 20, 1951). The creation of Victory Gardens created a small triangular exclave of the township, surrounded by Victory Gardens to the southeast and Dover to the northwest.

Randolph became a vacation haven in the early part of the 20th century, known for its woods, ponds, lakes and air. Through the 1950s, farms, large hotels and bungalow colonies dotted the community. Performers such as Phil Silvers, and Frank Sinatra appeared at the hotels. Boxers Max Baer, Floyd Patterson, James J. Braddock and Rocky Marciano trained or fought at the Saltz Hotel.

=== Landmarks ===
Randolph's township historical landmarks include the 1869 Bryant Distillery (famed for its applejack) and the 1924 Millbrook School, now rehabilitated and in use as offices. The Liberty Tree (which dated back to 1720) was also one of the town landmarks until its removal due to deterioration on August 31, 2018.

The Randolph Historical Society has preserved the township's historical heritage in the Museum of Old Randolph. One of Randolph's oldest streets, Gristmill Road, is on the National Register of Historic Places.

The Combs Hollow Historic District was added to the NRHP in 1996 for its significance in industry from c. 1735 to 1927.

== Geography ==
According to the United States Census Bureau, the township had a total area of 21.16 square miles (54.81 km^{2}), including 20.91 square miles (54.14 km^{2}) of land and 0.26 square miles (0.67 km^{2}) of water (1.22%).

Land in Randolph ranges from 551 feet (168 m) to 1,120 feet (340 m) above sea level. Randolph has been designated half rural, half suburban by the New Jersey State Planning Commission.

Unincorporated communities, localities and place names located partially or completely within the township include Black River Pond, Calais, Center Grove, Fernbrook, Ironia, Mill Brook, Mount Fern, Mount Freedom, Shongum and Youngstown.

Situated upstream of the Black River, the South Branch of the Raritan River, the Whippany River and the Rockaway River, the hills of Randolph attracted settlers and its streams provided power for industry.

The township is a suburb of New York City. Randolph borders the Morris County municipalities of Mine Hill, Dover, Rockaway Township and Victory Gardens to the north, Mendham Township to the south, Denville and Morris Township to the east, Chester Township to the southwest and Roxbury to the west.

=== Geology ===
The township is located within the New Jersey Highlands, one of New Jersey's four major physiographic provinces. Part of the Appalachian Mountains, the Highlands are characterized by alternating flat-topped ridges and deep-striking valleys.

=== Climate ===
On average, the warmest month is July. The highest recorded temperature was 102 °F in 1953. On average, the coolest month is January, while the maximum average precipitation occurs in September. The lowest recorded temperature was −24 °F in 1943.

Climate data for Randolph, New Jersey
Month	Jan	Feb	Mar	Apr	May	Jun	Jul	Aug	Sep	Oct	Nov	Dec	Year
Mean daily maximum °F (°C)	36 (2)	40 (4)	49 (9)	60 (16)	70 (21)	77 (25)	82 (28)	80 (27)	72 (22)	62 (17)	52 (11)	41 (5)	60 (16)
Mean daily minimum °F (°C)	17 (−8)	18 (−8)	26 (−3)	35 (2)	45 (7)	54 (12)	59 (15)	58 (14)	50 (10)	38 (3)	31 (−1)	22 (−6)	38 (3)
Average precipitation inches (mm)	4.30 (109.22)	3.23 (82.04)	4.18 (106.17)	4.54 (115.32)	4.93 (125.22)	4.78 (121.41)	5.03 (127.76)	4.78 (121.41)	5.09 (129.29)	4.05 (102.87)	4.32 (109.73)	4.05 (102.87)	53.28 (1,353.31)

== Demographics ==
Historical population
Census	Pop.	Note	%±
1810	1,271		—
1820	1,252		−1.5%
1830	1,443		15.3%
1840	1,801		24.8%
1850	2,632		46.1%
1860	3,173		20.6%
1870	5,111		61.1%
1880	7,700		50.7%
1890	7,972		3.5%
1900	2,246	*	−71.8%
1910	2,307		2.7%
1920	2,509		8.8%
1930	2,165	*	−13.7%
1940	2,160		−0.2%
1950	4,293		98.8%
1960	7,295	*	69.9%
1970	13,296		82.3%
1980	17,828		34.1%
1990	19,974		12.0%
2000	24,847		24.4%
2010	25,734		3.6%
2020	26,504		3.0%
2023 (est.)	26,547		0.2%
Population sources: 1800–1920; 1840 1850–1870; 1850 1870 1880–1890; 1890–1910 1910–1930; 1940–2000 2000; 2010 2020 * = Lost territory in previous decade.

=== 2010 census ===
The 2010 United States census counted 25,734 people, 9,013 households, and 7,075 families in the township. The population density was 1,235.9 per square mile (477.2/km^{2}). There were 9,343 housing units at an average density of 448.7 per square mile (173.2/km^{2}). The racial makeup was 82.44% (21,215) White, 2.68% (690) Black or African American, 0.11% (28) Native American, 10.46% (2,691) Asian, 0.01% (3) Pacific Islander, 2.27% (584) from other races, and 2.03% (523) from two or more races. Hispanic or Latino of any race were 10.17% (2,616) of the population.

Of the 9,013 households, 42.3% had children under the age of 18; 68.6% were married couples living together; 7.0% had a female householder with no husband present and 21.5% were non-families. Of all households, 17.8% were made up of individuals and 5.8% had someone living alone who was 65 years of age or older. The average household size was 2.85 and the average family size was 3.26.

28.0% of the population were under the age of 18, 6.3% from 18 to 24, 24.6% from 25 to 44, 31.8% from 45 to 64, and 9.2% who were 65 years of age or older. The median age was 40.1 years. For every 100 females, the population had 97.0 males. For every 100 females ages 18 and older there were 95.3 males.

The Census Bureau's 2006–2010 American Community Survey showed that (in 2010 inflation-adjusted dollars) median household income was $123,041 (with a margin of error of +/− $7,800) and the median family income was $144,069 (+/− $7,473). Males had a median income of $100,895 (+/− $2,256) versus $65,011 (+/− $5,834) for females. The per capita income for the township was $56,879 (+/− $3,318). About 1.8% of families and 3.3% of the population were below the poverty line, including 1.9% of those under age 18 and 2.7% of those age 65 or over.

=== 2000 census ===
As of the 2000 United States census, there were 24,847 people, 8,679 households, and 6,804 families residing in the township. The population density was 1,185.2 inhabitants per square mile (457.6/km^{2}). There were 8,903 housing units at an average density of 424.7 per square mile (164.0/km^{2}). The racial makeup of the township was 85.70% White, 2.30% African American, 0.06% Native American, 9.14% Asian, 0.02% Pacific Islander, 1.31% from other races, and 1.46% from two or more races. Hispanic or Latino of any race were 4.86% of the population.

There were 8,679 households, out of which 44.2% had children under the age of 18 living with them, 70.2% were married couples living together, 6.2% had a female householder with no husband present, and 21.6% were non-families. 18.0% of all households were made up of individuals, and 4.8% had someone living alone who was 65 years of age or older. The average household size was 2.86 and the average family size was 3.28.

In the township the population was spread out, with 29.7% under the age of 18, 5.2% from 18 to 24, 32.2% from 25 to 44, 25.7% from 45 to 64, and 7.3% who were 65 years of age or older. The median age was 36 years. For every 100 females, there were 98.3 males. For every 100 females age 18 and over, there were 95.8 males.

The median income for a household in the township was $97,589, and the median income for a family was $115,722. Males had a median income of $80,120 versus $45,455 for females. The per capita income for the township was $43,072. About 1.0% of families and 1.4% of the population were below the poverty line, including 1.0% of those under age 18 and 3.4% of those age 65 or over.

== Parks and recreation ==
The Brundage Park Recreation Complex covers 232 acres (94 ha). Facilities include six lighted tennis courts, four lighted softball fields, two lighted basketball courts, a tennis practice wall, a 4 miles (6.4 km) paved walking and jogging trail, Brundage Park Playhouse, a playground, a picnic pavilion, a lacrosse/soccer field, a pond (for fishing or ice skating), a softball field, and a multipurpose area for soccer and other field sports.

Freedom Park covers 172 acres (70 ha). Facilities include (all lighted): a football field, a lacrosse field (complete with two defibrillators, after a player was hit with a lacrosse ball in the heart), a Little League field, a Babe Ruth baseball field (which now also has a defibrillator after a player was hit in the heart with a baseball), a multipurpose area, a softball field, a picnic pavilion, a sand volleyball court, and a playground area.

Randolph Park covers 41 acres (17 ha). It has a beach. Other facilities include a beach house with a changing room, a refreshment stand, a picnic facilities, a playground area, a permanent docks for lap swimming, a volleyball court and a basketball court.

Heistein Park covers 44 acres (18 ha). Facilities include 6 soccer fields, 4 Little League/softball fields, a picnic pavilion, restrooms, a refreshment stand, and a lake for fishing and ice skating. Soccer tournaments are held here for travel team soccer.

Stonybrook Park covers 30 acres (12 ha). This park is used as a day camp during the summer months (June - August) and is divided by a local street to create east and west sections. Facilities include a field in the western portion, while the eastern portion hosts the day camp with a swimming pool, a small tot-lot, and various buildings for camp activities.

Kiwanis Park contains 1.8 acres (0.73 ha). Facilities include a playground, an open play area and picnic tables.

Rosenfarb Park facilities include a half-court basketball court and a picnic area.

Hidden Valley Park contains 51 acres (21 ha) of rolling hills, a pond and natural walking trails. The township's walking and biking trail cross the site.

Cohen Farm Park consists of an undeveloped 111 acres (45 ha). The township's 16-mile (26 km) trail system cuts through the park, connecting to Brundage Park and Freedom Park.

== Government ==
=== Local government ===
The Township Council is the legislative body of Randolph, operating under the Council-Manager form of government within the Faulkner Act, formally known as the Optional Municipal Charter Law. The township is one of 42 municipalities (of the 564) statewide that use this form of government. The Township Council is comprised of seven members, who are elected at-large in partisan elections to four-year terms of office on a staggered basis, with either three or four seats up for election in even-numbered years as part of the November general election. The council selects one of its members to serve as mayor and another as deputy mayor, at a reorganization meeting conducted each year. The council represents the public and develops and adopts policies, resolves public issues, formulates township policy through motions, resolutions and ordinances which reflect the needs of the public, and maintains a working knowledge of intergovernmental issues and how they will affect the Township of Randolph. Thirteen separate advisory boards and committees assist policy formulation of the council. The Township Council is similar to a corporate board of directors and is assisted by the Township Attorney, who prepares ordinances and advises on legal issues, the Township Clerk, who prepares resolutions, and the Township Manager, who functions much like the CEO of a corporation.

As of 2025, members of the Randolph Township Council are Mayor Joe Hathaway (R, term on council ends December 31, 2028; term as mayor ends 2025), Deputy Mayor Mark H. Forstenhausler (R, term on council ends 2026; term as deputy mayor ends 2025), Christine Carey (R, 2028), Helene Elbaum (R, 2026), Lou Nisivoccia (R, 2026), Marie Potter (R, 2026) and Joanne Veech (R, 2024).

Mark Forstenhausler was selected in February 2014 to fill the vacant seat expiring in December 2014 of Tom MacArthur, who resigned from office after announcing that he was moving out of the township.

=== Federal, state and county representation ===
Randolph Township is located in the 11th Congressional District and is part of New Jersey's 25th state legislative district.

For the 119th United States Congress, New Jersey's 11th congressional district is represented by Analilia Mejia (D, Glen Ridge) who was elected in a 2026 special election to serve for the remainder of the Congress following the resignation Mikie Sherrill (D, Montclair), who was elected Governor of New Jersey in 2025. New Jersey is represented in the United States Senate by Democrats Cory Booker (Newark, term ends 2027) and Andy Kim (Moorestown, term ends 2031).

For the 2026–2027 session, the 25th legislative district of the New Jersey Legislature is represented in the State Senate by Anthony M. Bucco (R, Boonton Township) and in the General Assembly by Aura K. Dunn (R, Mendham Borough) and Marisa Sweeney (D, Morristown).

Morris County is governed by a Board of County Commissioners comprised of seven members who are elected at-large in partisan elections to three-year terms on a staggered basis, with either one or three seats up for election each year as part of the November general election. Actual day-to-day operation of departments is supervised by County Administrator Deena Leary.

As of 2026, Morris County's Commissioners (with all terms ending December 31) are Director Stephen H. Shaw (R, Mountain Lakes, 2027), Deputy Director John Krickus (R, Washington Township, 2027), Douglas Cabana (R, Boonton Township, 2028), Thomas J. Mastrangelo (R, Montville, 2028), Christine Myers (R, Harding Township, 2028), Tayfun Selen (R, Chatham Township, 2026), and Deborah Smith (R, Denville Township, 2027).

The county's constitutional officers are County Clerk Ann F. Grossi (R, Parsippany–Troy Hills, 2028), Sheriff James M. Gannon (R, Boonton Township, 2025) and Surrogate Heather Darling (R, Roxbury, 2029).

=== Politics ===
United States presidential election results for Randolph 2024 2020 2016 2012 2008 2004
Year	Republican		Democratic		Third party(ies)	
Year	No.	%	No.	%	No.	%
2024	6,861	45.46%	7,952	52.69%	279	1.85%
2020	6,741	42.14%	9,023	56.41%	231	1.44%
2016	5,968	45.18%	6,785	51.37%	455	3.44%
2012	6,636	53.44%	5,662	45.60%	119	0.96%
2008	6,745	50.91%	6,388	48.21%	116	0.88%
2004	7,166	56.23%	5,488	43.06%	90	0.71%

As of March 2011, there were a total of 16,398 registered voters in Randolph Township, of which 3,822 (23.3%) were registered as Democrats, 4,895 (29.9%) were registered as Republicans and 7,670 (46.8%) were registered as Unaffiliated. There were 11 voters registered as Libertarians or Greens.

In the 2020 presidential election, Democrat Joe Biden received 56.4% of the vote (9,023 cast), ahead of Republican Donald Trump with 42.1% of the vote (6,741 cast), and other candidates with 1.5% (231 votes). In the 2016 presidential election, Democrat Hillary Clinton received 51.4% of the vote (6,785 cast), ahead of Republican Donald Trump with 45.2% (5,968 votes), and other candidates with 3.4% (455 votes), and the 13,208 ballots cast by the township's 18,760 registered voters resulted in a turnout of 70.4%, with the election being the first time in decades that a Democrat won a plurality of votes in the town. In the 2012 presidential election, Republican Mitt Romney received 53.4% of the vote (6,636 cast), ahead of Democrat Barack Obama with 45.6% (5,662 votes), and other candidates with 1.0% (119 votes), among the 12,479 ballots cast by the township's 17,405 registered voters (62 ballots were spoiled), for a turnout of 71.7%. In the 2008 presidential election, Republican John McCain received 50.7% of the vote (6,745 cast), ahead of Democrat Barack Obama with 48.0% (6,388 votes) and other candidates with 0.9% (116 votes), among the 13,310 ballots cast by the township's 17,158 registered voters, for a turnout of 77.6%. In the 2004 presidential election, Republican George W. Bush received 56.1% of the vote (7,166 ballots cast), outpolling Democrat John Kerry with 43.0% (5,488 votes) and other candidates with 0.5% (90 votes), among the 12,764 ballots cast by the township's 16,944 registered voters, for a turnout percentage of 75.3.

Gubernatorial election results for Randolph
Year	Republican		Democratic		Third party(ies)	
Year	No.	%	No.	%	No.	%
2025	5,408	44.65%	6,658	54.97%	47	0.39%
2021	4,877	48.99%	5,012	50.34%	67	0.67%
2017	3,547	49.31%	3,512	48.83%	134	1.86%
2013	4,838	68.88%	2,065	29.40%	121	1.72%
2009	4,936	58.69%	2,742	32.60%	733	8.71%
2005	4,048	54.44%	3,227	43.40%	161	2.17%

In the 2013 gubernatorial election, Republican Chris Christie received 68.9% of the vote (4,838 cast), ahead of Democrat Barbara Buono with 29.4% (2,065 votes), and other candidates with 1.7% (121 votes), among the 7,103 ballots cast by the township's 17,213 registered voters (79 ballots were spoiled), for a turnout of 41.3%. In the 2009 gubernatorial election, Republican Chris Christie received 58.4% of the vote (4,936 ballots cast), ahead of Democrat Jon Corzine with 32.5% (2,742 votes), Independent Chris Daggett with 8.3% (697 votes) and other candidates with 0.4% (36 votes), among the 8,445 ballots cast by the township's 16,615 registered voters, yielding a 50.8% turnout.

United States Senate election results for Randolph1
Year	Republican		Democratic		Third party(ies)	
Year	No.	%	No.	%	No.	%
2024	6,761	46.80%	7,493	51.87%	193	1.34%
2018	5,542	49.30%	5,362	47.70%	337	3.00%
2012	6,095	52.63%	5,348	46.18%	138	1.19%
2006	4,459	55.32%	3,475	43.11%	126	1.56%

United States Senate election results for Randolph2
Year	Republican		Democratic		Third party(ies)	
Year	No.	%	No.	%	No.	%
2020	7,059	44.91%	8,524	54.23%	134	0.85%
2014	3,109	52.86%	2,704	45.97%	69	1.17%
2013	2,544	51.90%	2,319	47.31%	39	0.80%
2008	6,606	54.21%	5,407	44.37%	172	1.41%

== Education ==
The Randolph Township Schools educate children in public school for pre-kindergarten through twelfth grade, as well as special-needs preschoolers. As of the 2022–23 school year, the district, comprised of six schools, had an enrollment of 4,220 students and 373.0 classroom teachers (on an FTE basis), for a student–teacher ratio of 11.3:1. Schools in the district (with 2022–23 enrollment data from the National Center for Education Statistics) are Center Grove Elementary School with 533 students in grades PreK–5, Fernbrook Elementary School with 498 students in grades K–5, Ironia Elementary School with 479 students in grades K–5, Shongum Elementary School with 437 students in grades K–5, Randolph Middle School with 922 students in grades 6–8 and Randolph High School with 1,349 students in grades 9–12.

Established in 1968, the main campus of the County College of Morris is located on a 222-acre (90 ha) campus in Randolph. Rutgers University has a partnership with County College of Morris that allows students who have earned an associate degree to complete a bachelor's degree through the off-campus Rutgers courses taken at the County College of Morris campus in Randolph.

The Gottesman RTW Academy (Formerly Hebrew Academy of Morris County) is a coeducational Jewish day school for students in preschool through eighth grade, serving approximately 225 children. The school has been recognized as a recipient of the National Blue Ribbon School Award by the United States Department of Education.

== Transportation ==
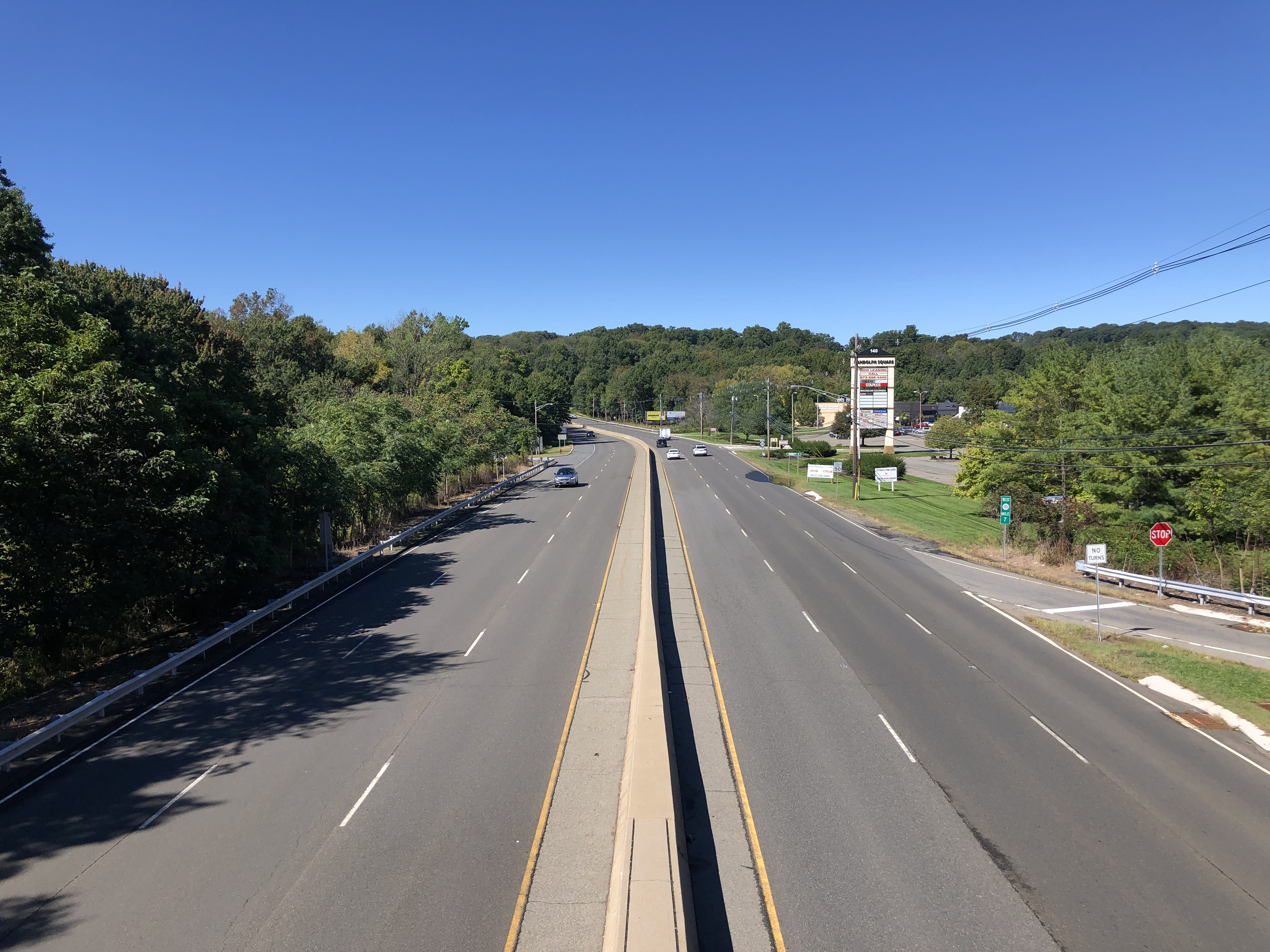
Route 10 westbound in Randolph

=== Roads and highways ===
As of May 2010, the township had a total of 144.95 miles (233.27 km) of roadways, of which 119.53 miles (192.36 km) were maintained by the municipality, 19.62 miles (31.58 km) by Morris County and 5.80 miles (9.33 km) by the New Jersey Department of Transportation.

Route 10, Dover-Chester Road (County Route 513), and Sussex Turnpike (County Route 617) pass through township lines.

=== Public transportation ===
The NJ Transit 875 route serves the township.

NJ Transit offered local bus service on the MCM2 and MCM7 routes which were eliminated due to budget constraints.

== Community ==
Randolph has organized events, including high school sports, senior citizen gatherings, and various group activities. The public library schedules reading groups and other programs. Recreation programs are available for children, teenagers and adults. Games and socials are held at the Senior Citizen Center at the Brundage Park Playhouse, which presents plays and musicals with youth and adult performers.

== Notable people ==
People who were born in, residents of, or otherwise closely associated with Randolph include:

- Bryce Aiken (born 1996), college basketball player for the Seton Hall Pirates
- Bill Armstrong (born 1955), former defensive back who played two seasons with the Hamilton Tiger-Cats of the Canadian Football League
- Frank Beltre (born 1990), defensive lineman who has played for the Calgary Stampeders of the Canadian Football League
- Emily Chang (born 1980), actress who has appeared in The Vampire Diaries
- Antonio Cromartie (born 1984), professional football player for the New York Jets
- Doug Dale, host of the Comedy Central series TV Funhouse
- Robby Foley (born 1996), racing driver who competes in the WeatherTech SportsCar Championship
- Sidney Gish (born 1997), singer-songwriter
- Mike Groh (born 1971), college football coach and former player who is wide receivers coach for the Indianapolis Colts
- Garry Howatt (born 1952), professional hockey player for the New York Islanders, who owned a local golf complex (Mt. Freedom Golf) for 21 years
- Jon Hurwitz (born 1977), screenwriter whose credits include Harold & Kumar Go to White Castle, Scary Movie 3 (rewrite)
- Jennifer Jones (born 1967), dancer and actress, who in 1987 became the first African-American Radio City Music Hall Rockette
- Payal Kadakia (born 1983), founder and chairman of ClassPass
- Liz Katz (born 1988), cosplayer and actress whose credits include Guest House and Borderlands 3
- Michael Lansing (born 1994), professional soccer player who plays as a goalkeeper for Kristiansund BK in the Danish Superliga
- Tom MacArthur (born 1960), businessman and politician who served in the United States House of Representatives for New Jersey's 3rd congressional district from 2015 to 2019 and previously served as Mayor of Randolph
- Amanda Magadan (born 1995), member of the United States women's national field hockey team starting in 2017
- Brendan Mahon (born 1995), guard for the Carolina Panthers of the NFL
- Matthew Martin, dancer and performer who toured nationally with Riverdance before appearing on Broadway as a member of the Riverdance Irish Dance Troupe.
- Brendan McSorley (born 2002), professional soccer player
- George Parros (born 1979), hockey player for the Montreal Canadiens
- Chris Pennie (born 1977), drummer for The Dillinger Escape Plan and Coheed and Cambria
- Sherry Ross (born c. 1954), sports broadcaster and journalist who is a color commentator for the New Jersey Devils radio broadcasts
- Lee Saltz (born 1963), former professional American football quarterback in the National Football League who played for the Detroit Lions and the New England Patriots
- Hayden Schlossberg (born 1978), screenwriter whose credits include Harold & Kumar Go to White Castle, Scary Movie 3 (rewrite)
- Bob Van Dillen (born 1972), meteorologist on HLN's Morning Express with Robin Meade
- Drew Willy (born 1986), professional quarterback
