= Alice Weaver Flaherty =

American neurologist

Alice Flaherty
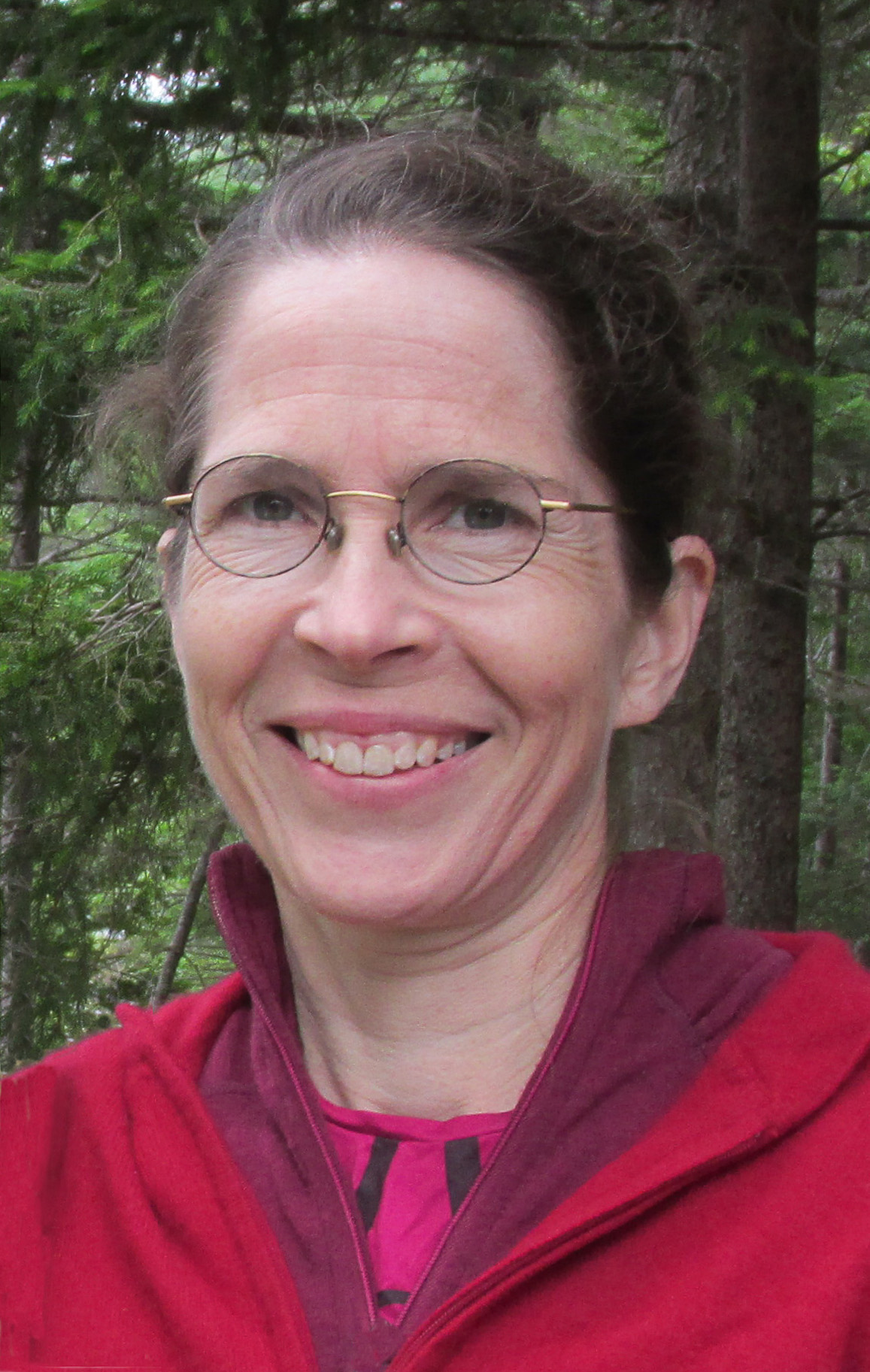
- Alice Flaherty in 2013
- Born: Alice Weaver Flaherty; 21 July 1963 (age 62); Morristown, New Jersey, United States
- Spouse: Andrew John Hrycyna (m. 1986)
- Children: 2
- Parents: Franklin Trimby (father); Sarah Louise (mother)

Alice Weaver Flaherty is an American neurologist. She is a researcher, physician, educator, and author of the 2004 book The Midnight Disease: The Drive to Write, Writer's Block, and the Creative Brain, about the neural basis of creativity.

== Early life and education ==
Alice Flaherty was born on 21 July 1963 in Morristown, New Jersey, to mechanical engineer Franklin Trimby Flaherty and librarian Sarah Louise Flaherty. She grew up in Brookside, an unincorporated community in Mendham Township, New Jersey and graduated from West Morris Mendham High School. She completed her undergraduate degree and her medical degree at Harvard University as well as a fellowship there. She also completed a Ph.D. at MIT.

== Career ==
Flaherty is a joint associate professor of neurology and psychiatry at Harvard Medical School. She is a neurologist at Massachusetts General Hospital. She was the first head of the MGH neurology department's Brain Stimulator Unit, where "she uses deep brain stimulators to treat neurological disease and psychiatric disease. Her research focuses on voluntary control of action, and how human brains represent their bodies and attitude, two factors that help drive suffering in depression, Parkinson's, and somatoform disorders."

She writes in various genres, including "scientific papers, humorous essays, and picture books". Her book, The Massachusetts General Hospital Handbook of Neurology was for years the most "widely used neurology text in its class". Her most famous book, The Midnight Disease, appeared on "Best Books of 2004" lists in The Washington Post and The San Francisco Chronicle.

== Experience with hypergraphia ==
After her premature twin boys died soon after their birth, Flaherty was full of grief. Several days later, however, she "awoke one morning with an overwhelming desire to put everything on her mind on paper". She describes her experiences with hypergraphia, this overwhelming urge to write. She claims she could not stop for four months. Flaherty says, "It was as if someone has thrown a switch... Everything seemed so full of importance, I had to write it all down and preserve it." A similar experience occurred after the birth of her premature twin girls, who survived. Following the two births, her abilities to produce creative works were heightened. The Midnight Disease tried to make sense of this phenomenon.

== Media work ==
Flaherty gave a TEDx talk Danger and Creativity, in 2019. She was a consultant on two TV drama series pilots based on her life: The Madness of Jane, created by Rob LaZebnik, and Hysteria, created by Shaun Cassidy. She has appeared on many TV and radio broadcasts as a public advocate for the abilities of patients with brain illnesses. She was featured on the podcast The Great God of Depression, created by Pagan Kennedy, about her interactions with the writer William Styron. Her image hangs in the Museum of Fine Arts, Boston, in the oil painting Museum Epiphany 3 painted by Warren and Lucia Prosperi. She was the protagonist of Bedside Manner, directed by Corinne Botz, which in 2016 won the Grand Jury Prize for Best Short Documentary, DOC NYC, Oscar-qualifying.

== Publications ==
=== Selected journal articles ===
- Graybiel, A.M., Aosaki, T., Flaherty, A.W., Kimura, M. "The basal ganglia and adaptive motor control" (1994) Science, 265 (5180), pp. 1826–1831.
- Flaherty, A.W., Graybiel, A.M. "Input-output organization of the sensorimotor striatum in the squirrel monkey" (1994) Journal of Neuroscience, 14 (2), pp. 599–610.
- Flaherty A.W. "Frontotemporal and dopaminergic control of idea generation and creative drive". J Comparative Neurology. 2005;493(1):147-53.
- Flaherty, A.W. "Creativity and disease: Mechanisms and treatment". Canadian J. Psychiatry. 2011;56(3):132-143.

=== Books and non-technical articles ===
- Flaherty, Alice W. The Midnight Disease: The Drive to Write, Writer's Block, and the Creative Brain. Boston, Mass: Houghton Mifflin, 2004. ISBN 978-0-618-23065-5
  - German translation as "Die Mitternachtskrankheit : warum Schriftsteller schreiben müssen; Schreibzwang, Schreibrausch, Schreibblockade und das kreative Gehirn" Berlin, 2004. ISBN 978-3-932909-39-9
  - Japanese translation by Toshiko Yoshida. 書きたがる脳 : 言語と創造性の科学 / Kakitagaru nō: gengo to sōzōsei no kagaku. Tōkyō: Randamuhausukōdansha, 2006.
  - Arabic translation by Haitham Rasheed Farht داء منتصف أل ليل . (Daa Montasaf Al Layl). Abu Dhabi: Kalima; 2021.
- Flaherty, Alice W., illus. Magoon, Scott. The Luck of the Loch Ness Monster. Boston: Houghton, Mifflin; 2007. ISBN 978-0618556441
  - Korean translation as Flaherty, Alice W., illus. Magoon, Scott. 호수 의 행운 괴물 다움 [hosu ui haeng-un goemul daum]. Seoul: Marubol Publications; 2008.
- Flaherty, Alice W., and Natalia S. Rost. The Massachusetts General Hospital Handbook of Neurology. Philadelphia: Wolters Kluwer Health/Lippincott Williams & Wilkins, 2nd ed. 2007. ISBN 978-0-7817-5137-7
  - Translated into Japanese as Flaherty, Alice W., and Takamichi Hattori. MGH 神経内科ハンドブック / MGH shinkei naika handobukku. Tokyo: Medikaru saiensu intanashonaru, 2001
- Flaherty, AW. Playing doctor well. Neurology. 2008;70(11):826-7.
- Flaherty, AW. Special effects: What can the dramatic arts teach doctors about improving their performances? Harvard Medical Bulletin. 2009;82(2):12-17.
- Flaherty, Alice W. Performing the art of medicine. Total Art Journal. 1(1), 2011.
- Flaherty AW. Writing and drugs. Writing and Pedagogy. 4(2), 2012.
- Flaherty AW. Homeostasis and the control of creative drive. In R. E. Jung & O. Vartanian (Eds.), The Cambridge Handbook of the Neuroscience of Creativity. New York: Cambridge University Press, 2018. ISBN 9781316556238
