= Mendham Township Public Schools =

School district in Morris County, New Jersey, US

Address
- 18 West Main Street Brookside, Morris County, New Jersey, 07926; United States
- Coordinates: 40.796359°N 74.566513°W

District information
- Grades: PreK-8
- Superintendent: Salvatore M. Constantino
- Business administrator: Donna Mosner
- Schools: 2

Students and staff
- Enrollment: 745 (as of 2020–21)
- Faculty: 73.9 FTEs
- Student–teacher ratio: 10.1:1

Other information
- District Factor Group: J
- Website: www.mendhamtwp.org
Ind.	Per pupil	District spending	Rank (*)	K-8 average	%± vs. average
1A	Total Spending	$23,306	63	$18,891	23.4%
1	Budgetary Cost	16,097	49	14,159	13.7%
2	Classroom Instruction	9,476	45	8,659	9.4%
6	Support Services	2,046	24	2,167	−5.6%
8	Administrative Cost	1,865	57	1,547	20.6%
10	Operations & Maintenance	1,981	55	1,612	22.9%
13	Extracurricular Activities	292	62	104	180.8%
16	Median Teacher Salary	65,170	41	61,136
Data from NJDoE 2014 Taxpayers' Guide to Education Spending. *Of K-8 districts with 401-750 students. Lowest spending=1; Highest=64

The Mendham Township Public Schools is a community public school district serving students in pre-kindergarten through eighth grade in Mendham Township, in Morris County, in the U.S. state of New Jersey.

As of the 2020–21 school year, the district, comprising two schools, had an enrollment of 745 students and 73.9 classroom teachers (on an FTE basis), for a student–teacher ratio of 10.1:1.

The district is classified by the New Jersey Department of Education as being in District Factor Group "J", the highest of eight groupings. District Factor Groups organize districts statewide to allow comparison by common socioeconomic characteristics of the local districts. From lowest socioeconomic status to highest, the categories are A, B, CD, DE, FG, GH, I and J.

Students in public school for ninth through twelfth grades attend West Morris Mendham High School, which is located in Mendham Borough and serves students from Chester Borough, Chester Township, Mendham Borough and Mendham Township. The school is part of the West Morris Regional High School District, which also serves students from Washington Township at West Morris Mendham High School. As of the 2020–21 school year, the high school had an enrollment of 1,142 students and 91.9 classroom teachers (on an FTE basis), for a student–teacher ratio of 12.4:1.

== Awards and recognition ==
Mendham Township Middle School was one of 11 in the state to be recognized in 2014 by the United States Department of Education's Blue Ribbon Schools Program.

Mendham Township Elementary School was honored by the National Blue Ribbon Schools Program in 2019, one of nine schools in the state recognized as Exemplary High Performing Schools.

== Schools ==
Schools in the district (with 2020–21 enrollment data from the National Center for Education Statistics) are:

Elementary school

- Mendham Township Elementary School with 429 students in grades PreK-4
  - Julianne Kotcho, principal

Middle school

- Mendham Township Middle School with 313 students in grades 5-8
  - Patrick J. Ciccone, principal

== Administration ==
Core members of the district's administration are:

- Salvatore M. Constantino, superintendent
- Donna Mosner, business administrator and board secretary

== Board of education ==
The district's board of education is comprised of seven members who set policy and oversee the fiscal and educational operation of the district through its administration. As a Type II school district, the board's trustees are elected directly by voters to serve three-year terms of office on a staggered basis, with either two or three seats up for election each year held (since 2014) as part of the November general election. The board appoints a superintendent to oversee the district's day-to-day operations and a business administrator to supervise the business functions of the district.
