= Randolph Township Schools =

School district in Morris County, New Jersey, US

Address
- 25 School House Road Randolph, Morris County, New Jersey, 07869; United States
- Coordinates: 40.843864°N 74.57183°W

District information
- Grades: PreK-12
- Superintendent: Jennifer Fano
- Business administrator: Kyle Bleeker
- Schools: 6

Students and staff
- Enrollment: 4,220 (as of 2022–23)
- Faculty: 373.0 FTEs
- Student–teacher ratio: 11.3:1

Other information
- District Factor Group: I
- Website: www.rtnj.org
| Ind. | Per pupil | District spending | Rank (*) | K-12 average | %± vs. average |
|---|---|---|---|---|---|
| 1A | Total Spending | $18,451 | 48 | $18,891 | −2.3% |
| 1 | Budgetary Cost | 14,403 | 49 | 14,783 | −2.6% |
| 2 | Classroom Instruction | 8,647 | 52 | 8,763 | −1.3% |
| 6 | Support Services | 2,241 | 48 | 2,392 | −6.3% |
| 8 | Administrative Cost | 1,478 | 57 | 1,485 | −0.5% |
| 10 | Operations & Maintenance | 1,505 | 35 | 1,783 | −15.6% |
| 13 | Extracurricular Activities | 391 | 96 | 268 | 45.9% |
| 16 | Median Teacher Salary | 68,750 | 75 | 64,043 |
Data from NJDoE 2014 Taxpayers' Guide to Education Spending. *Of K-12 districts with more than 3,500 students. Lowest spending=1; Highest=103

The Randolph Township Schools are a comprehensive community public school district that serves children in pre-kindergarten through twelfth grade from Randolph, in Morris County, in the U.S. state of New Jersey.

As of the 2022–23 school year, the district, comprising six schools, had an enrollment of 4,220 students and 373.0 classroom teachers (on an FTE basis), for a student–teacher ratio of 11.3:1.

== Awards and recognition ==
The district was selected as one of the top "100 Best Communities for Music Education in America 2006" by the American Music Conference.

The NAMM Foundation named the district in its 2008 survey of the "Best Communities for Music Education", which included 110 school districts nationwide.

The district's high school was the 16th-ranked public high school in New Jersey out of 339 schools statewide in New Jersey Monthly magazine's September 2016 cover story on the state's "Top Public High Schools", using a new ranking methodology.

In 2022, the United States Department of Education announced that Center Grove Elementary School was named as a National Blue Ribbon School, along with eight other schools in the state and 297 schools nationwide.

== Schools ==
Schools in the district (with 2022–23 enrollment data from the National Center for Education Statistics) are:

Elementary schools

- Center Grove Elementary School with 533 students in grades PreK–5
- Fernbrook Elementary School with 498 students in grades K–5
- Ironia Elementary School with 479 students in grades K–5
- Shongum Elementary School with 437 students in grades K–5

Middle school

- Randolph Middle School with 922 students in grades 6–8

High school

- Randolph High School with 1,349 students in grades 9–12

== Administration ==
Core members of the district's administration are:

- Jennifer A. Fano, Superintendent
- Kyle Bleeker, Business Administrator / Board Secretary

== Board of education ==
The district's board of education, comprised of nine members, sets policy and oversees the fiscal and educational operation of the district through its administration. As a Type II school district, the board's trustees are elected directly by voters to serve three-year terms of office on a staggered basis, with three seats up for election each year held (since 2012) as part of the November general election. The board appoints a superintendent to oversee the district's day-to-day operations and a business administrator to supervise the business functions of the district.
