= Shongum, New Jersey =

Populated place in Morris County, New Jersey, US

- Unincorporated community
- Location in Morris County (Inset: Morris County in New Jersey) Shongum (New Jersey) Shongum (the United States)
- Coordinates: 40°50′39″N 74°31′59″W
- Country: United States
- State: New Jersey
- County: Morris
- Township: Randolph
- Elevation: 774 ft (236 m)
- ZIP Code: 07869
- GNIS feature ID: 0880568

Shongum is an unincorporated community located within Randolph Township in Morris County, in the U.S. state of New Jersey. It is located near Shongum Lake. The community is located 3.0 miles (4.8 km) away from Mount Freedom, New Jersey.

The first inhabitants of Shongum were the Lenni Lenape Indians who belonged to the Minsi tribe. They had six campsites and a rock shelter in the Shongum area and used the banks of the Den Brook as a pathway to a branch of the Minisink trail in Denville. The land was purchased by the Proprietors of West Jersey from the Indians in 1712. William Penn, one of the Proprietors, received 2500 acres encompassing the Shongum area as a dividend in 1715.

The name Shongum is derived from Shawanguck or Shawangung, the Lenape word for "mountain".

== Shongum Lake and Club ==
The Shongum Club (then called the Shongum Lake Club) is located on Shongum Road at Shongum Lake and was founded in 1879 by prominent gentlemen from the Dover-Morristown area, as a gathering place for men who liked to hunt and fish. The club was dedicated to recreational activities and the clubhouse was leased from the Cutler family of Morristown. The clubhouse was probably built as early as 1853 and is still standing today.

Shongum Lake had a reputation for having an abundance of black bass and small mouth bass, perch, pickerel, blue gills and crappies. The lake is not a natural one, and was created in 1758 by Robert Young, who had purchased the land from William Penn to operate an iron forge. The Den Brook was dammed up to create a lake which was fed with a constant supply of "the purest water". In 1884, the club had 50 members, the initiation fee was $25.00, and yearly dues were $10.00. The guest register was quite impressive containing the names of many very wealthy men and prominent politicians. There were congressmen, senators, educators including the president of Rutgers University and even presidents who visited Shongum.

During the depression, membership dropped and the Cutler family sold the club building after it had been in the family for 100 years. It became the property of Benjamin Bragman and was used as a dwelling. In 1974 it was acquired by the Shongum Lake Property Owners Association and is used once again for club functions and private parties.

== See also ==
- Indian Lake (New Jersey)
- Rockaway River
