= Schiff Nature Preserve =

Nature preserve in Morris County, New Jersey

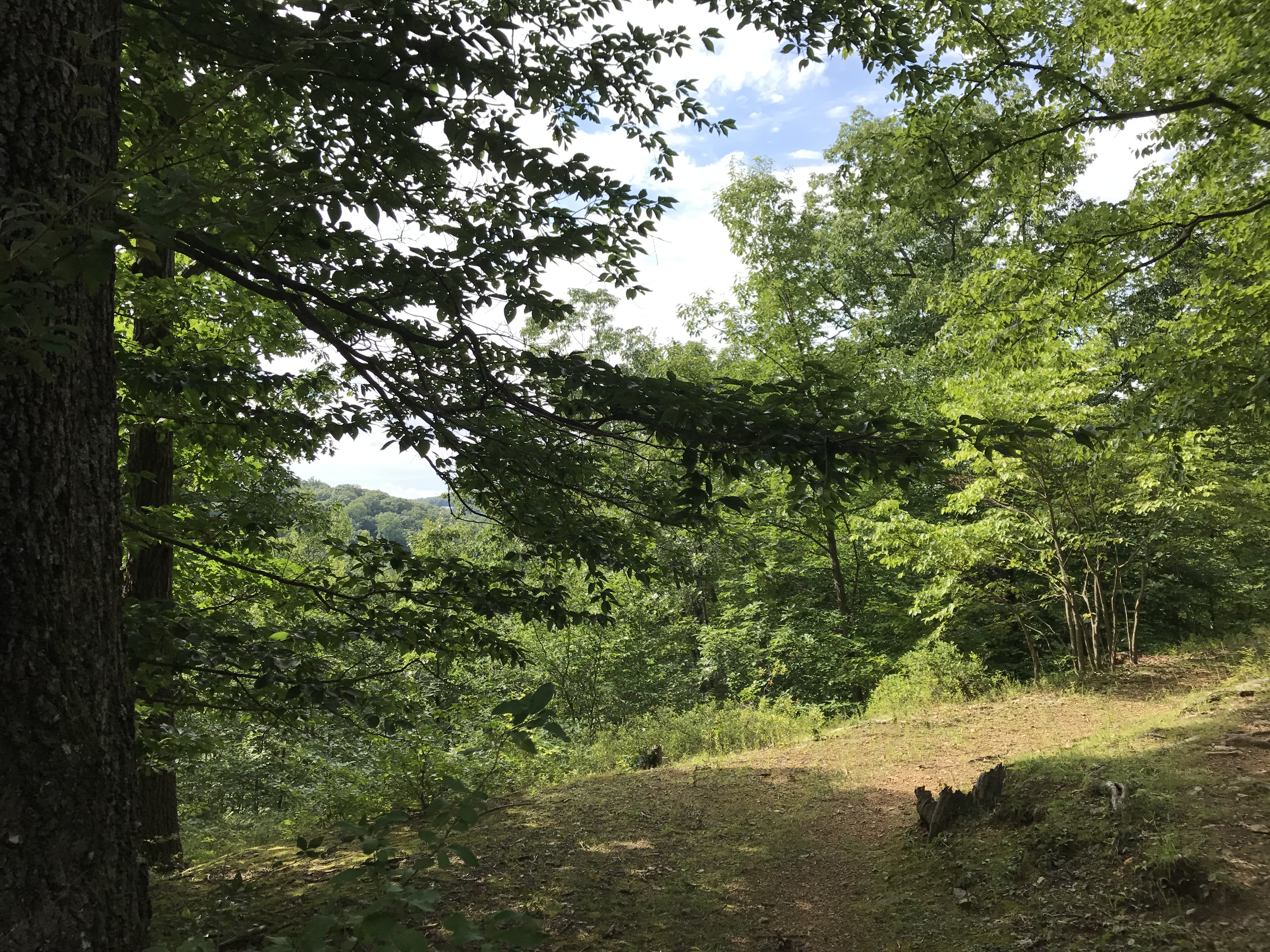

- Location within Morris County, New Jersey Location within New Jersey Location within the United States
- Location: 339 Pleasant Valley Road; Mendham, New Jersey
- Coordinates: 40°45′25″N 74°37′41″W
- Area: 354 acres (1.43 km^{2})
- Operator: Schiff Natural Lands Trust
- Website: www.schiffnaturepreserve.org

Schiff Nature Preserve is a 780-acre nature preserve located in Mendham Township and Mendham Borough in Morris County, New Jersey, United States. The property is the main site of the Schiff Natural Lands Trust, which also owns additional land throughout the area and holds about 50 acres in conservation easements. Historically known as the Brookrace Estate, it was documented by the Historic American Buildings Survey (HABS) in 1995.

== Facilities ==
The Preserve is open from dawn to dusk year-round and offers 14 miles of public access hiking trails. It also includes a nature center that offers environmental education programs including: guided hikes, programs for scout troops, school field trips, homeschoolers and more. The Nature Center, which includes a small library of field guides and maps, is staffed by volunteers.

== Invasive species control ==
Several summer programs offer opportunities for teenagers to learn about local invasives and to help with eradication. Species of special concern include Devil's Walkingstick, Chinese bushclover, and Tree of Heaven. Schiff is also attempting to reduce the local population of White-tailed deer in order to help restore the preserve's local flora.

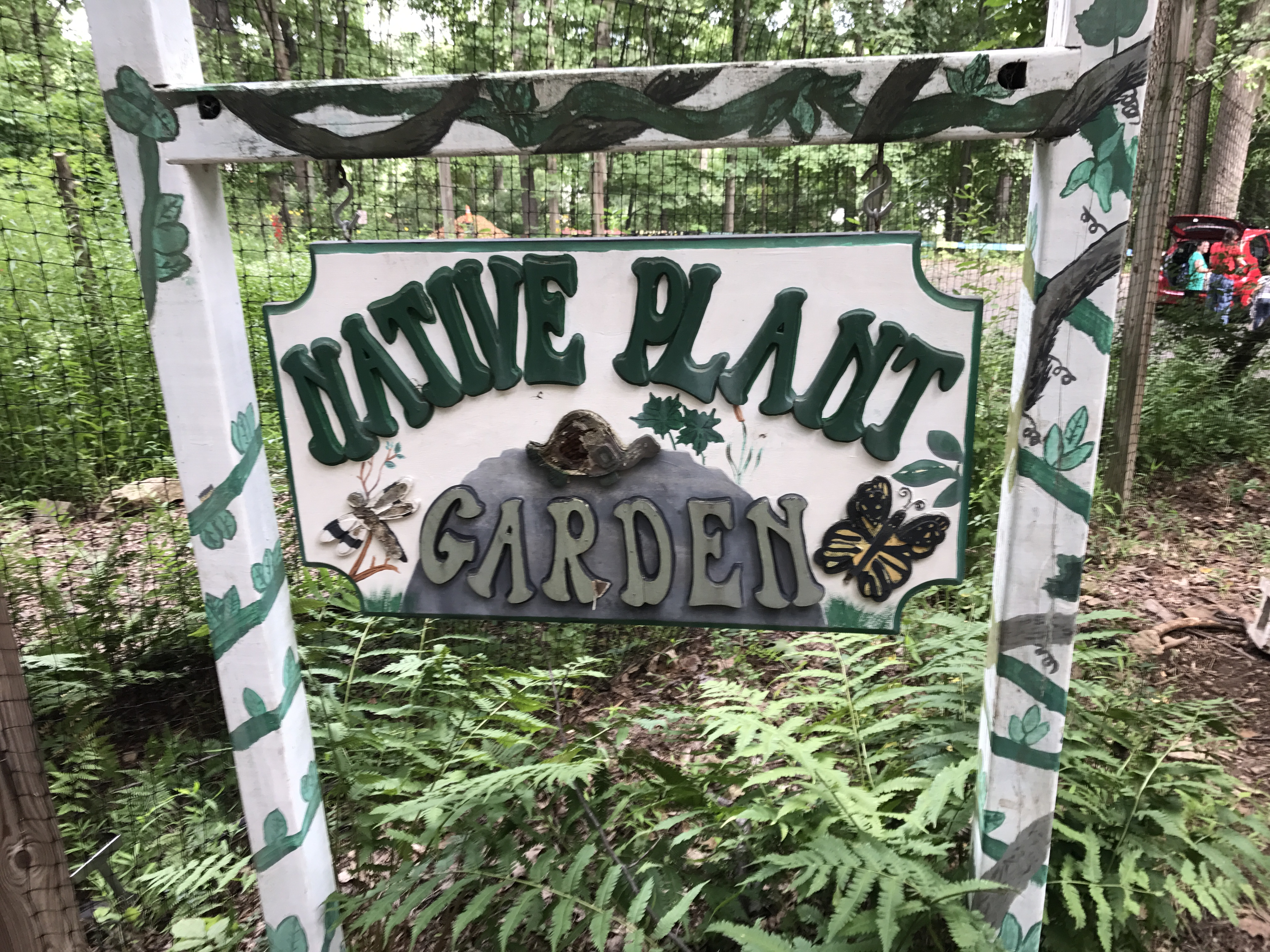
sign for a native plant garden at the Schiff Nature Preserve

== History ==
The preserve occupies the land that was once owned by the Mortimer L. Schiff Scout Reservation. A recent archaeological excavation discovered a 19th-century cellar hole along the Colonial Road on the preserve. Many artifacts were recovered during the excavation, and the cellar hole was reconstructed and is now a trailside attraction.
