= Randolph High School (New Jersey) =

High school in Morris County, New Jersey, US

Location
- 511 Millbrook Avenue; Randolph, Morris County, New Jersey 07869; United States
- 40.847991°N 74.562567°W

Information
- Type: Public high school
- Motto: Educating students - Creating the future
- Established: 1961
- School district: Randolph Township Schools
- NCES School ID: 341365004486
- Principal: Jessica Caruso Baxter
- Faculty: 117.2 FTEs
- Grades: 9-12
- Enrollment: 1,275 (as of 2024–25)
- Student to teacher ratio: 10.9:1
- Colors: Navy Blue and white
- Athletics conference: Northwest Jersey Athletic Conference (general); North Jersey Super Football Conference (football)
- Team name: Rams
- Rival: Roxbury High School
- Publication: Rampage
- Website: www.rtnj.org/our-schools/randolph-high-school

Randolph High School is a four-year comprehensive public high school in Randolph Township, in Morris County, in the U.S. state of New Jersey, serving students in ninth through twelfth grades as the lone secondary school of the Randolph Township Schools. The school has been accredited by the Middle States Association of Colleges and Schools Commission on Elementary and Secondary Schools since 1973.

As of the 2024–25 school year, the school had an enrollment of 1,275 students and 117.2 classroom teachers (on an FTE basis), for a student–teacher ratio of 10.9:1. There were 134 students (10.5% of enrollment) eligible for free lunch and 37 (2.9% of students) eligible for reduced-cost lunch.

== History ==
The efforts to create a high school began after the district was notified by the Dover School District in 1957 that Randolph students would no longer be accepted at Dover High School for the 1960–61 school year. The partially completed school opened for grades 7–12 in September 1961 on a 29-acre (12 ha) site and was constructed at a cost of cost of $1.75 million (equivalent to $18.9 million in 2025) for students from Randolph and those from Jefferson Township, who attended as part of a sending/receiving relationship until the 1964–65 school year, when Jefferson Township High School opened.

The current high school facility opened in October 1975, having been constructed at a cost of $7.2 million (equal to $43.1 million in 2025), at which point the original 1961 high school building was repurposed as Randolph Middle School.

== Awards and recognition ==
The school was the 16th-ranked public high school in New Jersey out of 339 schools statewide in New Jersey Monthly magazine's September 2016 cover story on the state's "Top Public High Schools", using a new ranking methodology. The school was the 63rd-ranked public high school in New Jersey out of 339 schools statewide in New Jersey Monthly magazine's September 2014 cover story on the state's "Top Public High Schools", using a new ranking methodology. The school had been ranked 37th in the state of 328 schools in 2012, after being ranked 52nd in 2010 out of 322 schools listed. The magazine ranked the school 65th in 2008 out of 316 schools. The school was ranked 32nd in the magazine's September 2006 issue, which included 316 schools across the state.

The school was named by Redbook magazine in April 1992 as the best high school in the state, recognizing the school for its academic and extracurricular performance.

Schooldigger.com ranked the school tied for 90th out of 381 public high schools statewide in its 2011 rankings (a decrease of 24 positions from the 2010 ranking) which were based on the combined percentage of students classified as proficient or above proficient on the mathematics (87.9%) and language arts literacy (96.1%) components of the High School Proficiency Assessment (HSPA).

== Athletics ==
The Randolph High School Rams participate in the regional Northwest Jersey Athletic Conference, which is composed of public and private high schools located in Morris, Sussex and Warren counties, and was established following a reorganization of sports leagues in Northern New Jersey by the New Jersey State Interscholastic Athletic Association (NJSIAA). Prior to the NJSIAA's 2010 realignment, the school had competed as part of the Iron Hills Conference, which included public and private high schools in Essex, Morris and Union counties. With 1,182 students in grades 10–12, the school was classified by the NJSIAA for the 2019–20 school year as Group IV for most athletic competition purposes, which included schools with an enrollment of 1,060 to 5,049 students in that grade range. The football team competes in the Freedom Blue division of the North Jersey Super Football Conference, which includes 112 schools competing in 20 divisions, making it the nation's biggest football-only high school sports league. The school was classified by the NJSIAA as Group IV North for football for 2024–2026, which included schools with 893 to 1,315 students.

The football team won the North II Group III state sectional championships in 1983 and from 1986 to 1989, and won in North II Group IV in both 1990 and 2010. The Randolph football team set New Jersey state records by winning 54 consecutive regular-season and playoff games and going unbeaten in 59 straight games from 1986 to 1991, a record since broken by Paulsboro High School with 63 straight wins from 1992 to 1998. In 1983, the team won the program's first North II Group III title and finished the season 10–1 after a 22–9 win against Linden High School in the finals. The 1987 team used its defense to hold on to a 12–7 win in the North II Group III championship game against Summit High School, to finish the season with a 10–1 record. The 1988 team finished the season with an 11–0 record and extended its unbeaten streak to 28 games after winning the North II Group III state sectional title with a 15–12 victory against previously undefeated Nutley High School after scoring a last-minute touchdown in the championship game. The team's 34–22 win over East Orange High School in October 1990 had broken the state record of 40 consecutive wins, which had been set by Memorial High School of West New York. The program won its fifth consecutive title and finished the season ranked 11th in the nation by USA Today after winning the 1990 North I Group IV sectional championship game with a 22–21 win against Montclair High School; the win was the team's 49th consecutive victory, breaking a record of 48 games without a loss (including two tie games) that had been set by Westfield High School from 1968 to 1973. The 2010 football team won the New Jersey North I Group IV state sectional title, the team's first since 1990, with a 19–0 win against Montclair. The school's football rivalry with Roxbury High School, which began in 1965, was listed at 18th on NJ.com's 2017 list "Ranking the 31 fiercest rivalries in N.J. HS football". Randolph leads the rivalry with a 29–20–3 overall record as of 2017.

In 1986, the boys' soccer team finished the season with a record of 18–6–1 after a 1–1 tie with Lakewood High School made the team the Group III co-champion.

The girls' soccer team won the Group III championship in 1991 (defeating runner-up Holy Cross Academy in the finals), 1995 (vs. West Windsor-Plainsboro High School) and 2001 (in overtime vs. Lenape High School). The 1991 team finished the season with a 20–1–1 record after winning the Group IV state title with a 1–0 victory against Holy Cross in the championship game played at Trenton State College.

The boys' wrestling team won the North II Group IV state championship in 1991–1995, won the North I Group IV title in 2004, 2005, 2008 and 2009; the team won the Group IV state championship in 1993.

The field hockey team won the North I / II Group IV sectional title in 1994 and won the North I Group IV championship in 2009.

The ice hockey team has won the Public School state championships in 2003 and 2006 (Public) and in 2007, 2009, 2011, 2012, 2013 and 2015 (Public A); the team's eight titles are tied for third-most of any school in the state. In 2003, Randolph High School won its first New Jersey State Interscholastic Athletic Association (NJSIAA) Public School Ice Hockey state championship in the 64-team tournament, with a 7–0 shutout of Brick Memorial High School at the Continental Airlines Arena. The team was the 2006 NJSIAA 64-team tournament. In 2007, they won the championship with a 5–4 win against Bridgewater-Raritan High School. The school won their fourth public title in the 2009 NJSIAA Public School A Ice Hockey state championship with a 1–0 win over Ridge High School. The team won the 2011 Public A title with a 1–0 win against Montgomery High School at the Prudential Center.

The boys' lacrosse team won the Group III state championship in 2005, defeating West Morris Central High School in the tournament final.

The cheerleading squad were three-time national champions, in 2006, 2007 and 2008 at the CanAm Nationals in Myrtle Beach, South Carolina. They won again in 2010 at the CanAm Nationals. In 2013, the small varsity team was second in the region behind national champions Burlington High School by 3 points. In 2013 the competition cheerleading team was ranked 16th in the nation in the Small Varsity division in the UCA NHSCC competition at Walt Disney World, which was the first time that RHS was a national finalist in the competition.

The girls' cross country team won the Group IV state championship in 2009.

The 2010 baseball team won the New Jersey Group IV state championship with an 8–4 win over Jackson Memorial High School. The team has won the Morris County Tournament three times, tied for the fourth-most in tournament history, winning in 1994, 2004, 2007 and 2013.

Randolph High School sponsors both indoor and outdoor track and field programs for boys and girls. The girls’ program, in particular, has developed into one of the school’s strongest athletic teams. Over the past decade, the Rams have earned multiple Morris County and North Jersey Section 1 titles, and several athletes have gone on to compete at the state championships. In addition to team titles, Randolph athletes have set numerous school records in sprinting, distance, and field events. Standout performances include county-record times in the 4x400 meter relay and individual state qualifiers in events such as the 800 meters, high jump, and hurdles. The girls’ track and field team has also drawn recognition at the state level, completing a four-year streak of state championships in the mid-2020s. The program’s sustained success has established Randolph as one of the leading public-school track and field teams in New Jersey.

== Media ==
Rampage (randolphrampage.com) is the school's student-run electronic news site, which was launched in December 2022.

== Administration ==
The school's principal is Jessica Caruso Baxter. Her core administration team includes two vice principals.

== Notable alumni ==
- Frank Beltre (born 1990), gridiron football player who played for the Calgary Stampeders of the Canadian Football League
- Robby Foley (born 1996), racing driver who competes in the WeatherTech SportsCar Championship
- Mike Groh (born 1971), football coach and former quarterback who was wide receivers coach of the New York Giants and had won Super Bowl LI as the wide receivers coach of the Philadelphia Eagles
- Jon Hurwitz (born 1977, class of 1996), screenwriter
- Jennifer Jones (born 1967), dancer and actress, who in 1987 became the first African-American Radio City Music Hall Rockette
- Payal Kadakia (born 1983, class of 2001), founder and chairman of ClassPass
- Liz Katz (born 1988, class of 2006), professional cosplayer and actress whose credits include Guest House and Borderlands 3
- Michael Lansing (born 1994), professional soccer player who plays as a goalkeeper for AC Horsens in the Danish Superliga
- Amanda Magadan (born 1995), member of the United States women's national field hockey team starting in 2017
- Brendan Mahon (born 1995), former guard for the Carolina Panthers of the NFL
- Chris Pennie (born 1977, class of 1995), drummer for The Dillinger Escape Plan and Coheed and Cambria
- Sherry Ross (born c. 1954, class of 1972), sportscaster and journalist
- Lee Saltz (born 1963), former NFL quarterback who played for the Detroit Lions and the New England Patriots
- Hayden Schlossberg (born 1978, class of 1996), screenwriter
- Bob Van Dillen (born 1972, class of 1991), meteorologist who appeared on HLN's Morning Express with Robin Meade
- Drew Willy (born 1986), NFL quarterback
