= Stewart G. Pollock =

American judge (born 1932)

Stewart Glasson Pollock (born December 21, 1932) is an American jurist who served as Associate Justice of the New Jersey Supreme Court from 1979 to 1999.

== Early life and education ==
Pollock was born in East Orange, New Jersey and raised in the Brookside section of Mendham Township, New Jersey. He graduated from Hamilton College in 1954 (bachelor of arts), New York University School of Law of Law in 1957 (bachelor of law), and from the University of Virginia in 1988 (master of law). In 1995, he received an honorary doctorate from Hamilton College.

== Career ==
After graduating from law school, he clerked and was associated with Toner Crowley Woelper & Vanderbilt. He was an Assistant United States Attorney from 1958 to 1960 and engaged in private practice with Schenck Price Smith & King from 1960 to 1974. During that time, he served as president of the Occupational Training Center For The Handicapped and as president of the Morristown Field Club. He reentered public service as a Commissioner of the Board of Public Utilities from 1974 to 1976, following which he rejoined Schenck Price Smith & King, while also serving as a Commissioner of the State Commission of Investigation. From 1978 to 1979, he was counsel to Governor Brendan T. Byrne.

In 1979, Byrne nominated Pollock to the Supreme Court, and he took his oath of office on June 28, 1979. Future Brooklyn Law School law professor Lawrence Solan was a law clerk for him from 1982-83. He was reappointed by Governor Thomas Kean in 1986. In 1991–92, he was Chairman of the Appellate Judge's conference of the American Bar Association.

Other professional activities include serving as president of the Morris County Bar Association, Chairman, Banking Law Section and trustee of the New Jersey State Bar Association, trustee, New Jersey Institute for Continuing Legal Education, trustee of the New York University Law Center Foundation, trustee of the Institute of Judicial Administration, Life Fellow of the American Bar Foundation, member of the editorial board of the New Jersey Law Journal, and member of the American Law Institute (where he was an Adviser on the Restatement on The Law Governing Lawyers).

While on the Court, he was seen as a unifier. He retired in 1999, and joined the firm of Riker Danzig Scherer Hyland & Perretti.

After retirement, he continued to serve the Court as Chairman of the Supreme Court Committee on Professional Rules of Responsibility, the Court's Commission on the Rules of Professional Conduct, and as Chairman of the Court's History Advisory Board. He also has served as an advisor on judicial appointments for several governors.

In private practice, he has been an active arbitrator and mediator and is an emeritus Fellow of the American College of Commercial Arbitrators.

== Personal life ==
In June 1953, he met Penelope Morrow at a conference in Cuernavaca, Mexico before they started service in American Friends Service Committee work camps. They were married in June 1956 at the end of her junior year at Mt. Holyoke College and his second year of law school, and remained married until Penny's death on June 30, 2014. They have four children: Wendy Pollock Gilson, Dr. Stewart Pollock, Jeffrey Pollock, and Jennifer Cheung, as well as twelve grandchildren and five great-grandchildren.

== See also ==
- List of justices of the Supreme Court of New Jersey
