= Mount Freedom, New Jersey =

Populated place in Morris County, New Jersey, US

- Unincorporated community
- Mount Freedom's location in Morris County (Inset: Morris County in New Jersey) Mount Freedom (New Jersey) Mount Freedom (the United States)
- Coordinates: 40°49′34″N 74°34′13″W
- Country: United States
- State: New Jersey
- County: Morris
- Township: Randolph
- Elevation: 883 ft (269 m)
- ZIP code: 07869
- GNIS feature ID: 0878536

Mount Freedom is an unincorporated community located within Randolph in Morris County, in the U.S. state of New Jersey. The area is served as United States Postal Service ZIP code 07869.

As of the 2000 United States census, the population for ZIP Code Tabulation Area 07869 was 24,452.

== History ==
For much of the 20th century, Mount Freedom was a resort community appealing to Jewish vacationers, with as many as 10,000 visitors from New York City flocking to the many hotels and dozens of bungalow colonies in the area. With the increasing ease of highway travel to the larger resorts in the Catskill Mountains and the declining cost of air travel, most of the hotels closed down by the end of the 1970s.

Mount Freedom appeared as an unincorporated place in the 1960 U.S. census (pop. 1,328) and the 1970 U.S. census (pop. 1,621).
