= Mendham Township, New Jersey =

Township in Morris County, New Jersey, US

- Township
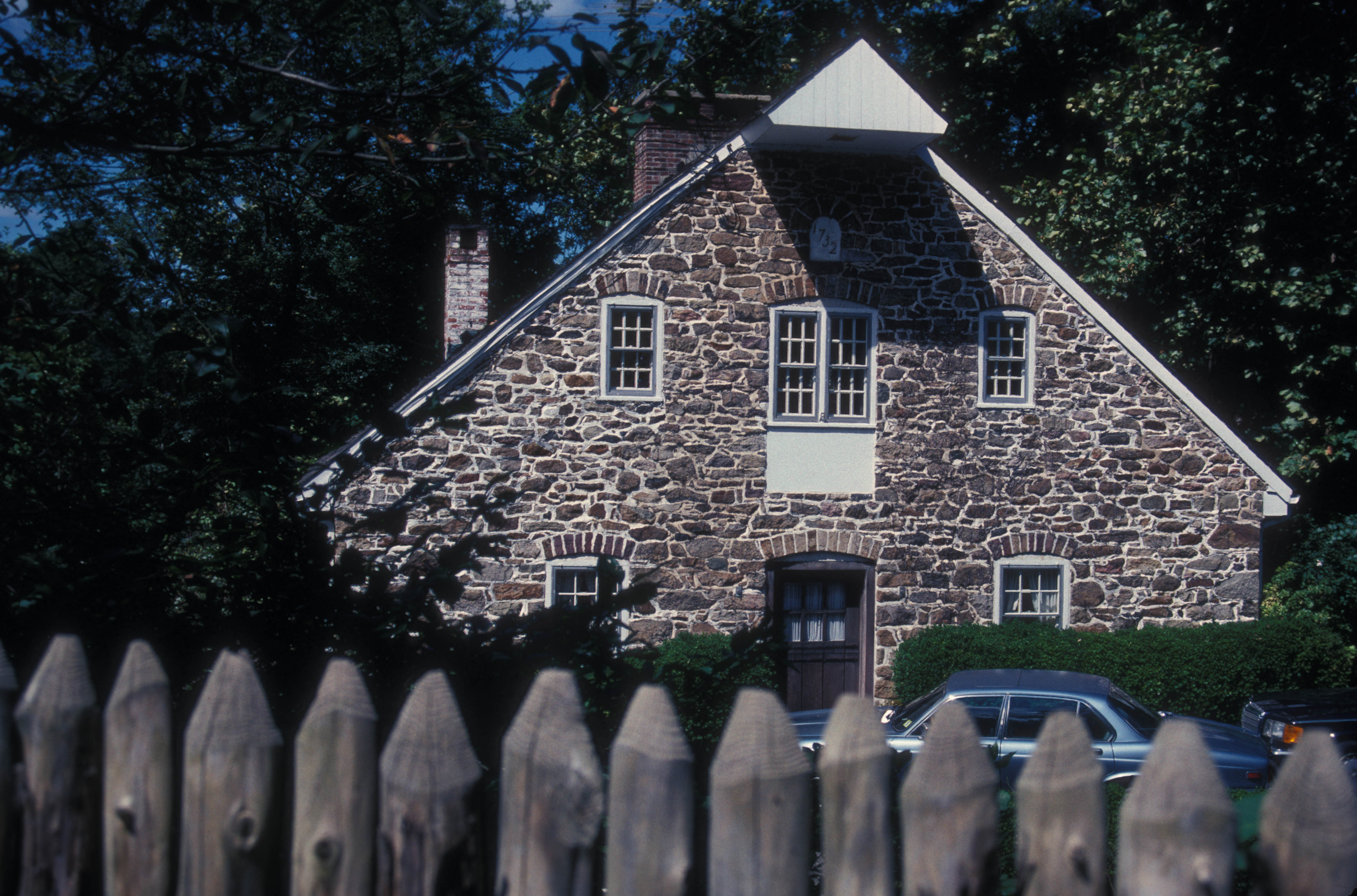
- Ralston Historic District c. 1980s-90s

- Seal

- Location of Mendham Township in Morris County highlighted in red (right). Inset map: Location of Morris County in New Jersey highlighted in orange (left).

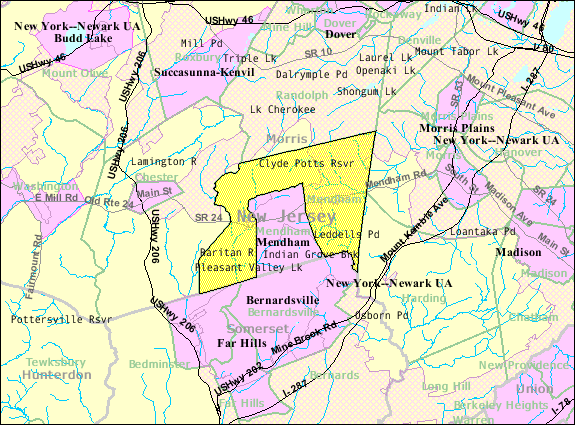
- Census Bureau map of Mendham Township, New Jersey

- Location in Morris County Location in New Jersey Location in the United States
- Coordinates: 40.761504°N 74.565167°W
- Country: United States
- State: New Jersey
- County: Morris
- Formed: March 29, 1749
- Incorporated: February 21, 1798

Government
  - Type: Township
  - Body: Township Committee
  - Mayor: Sarah Neibart (R, term ends December 31, 2025)
  - Administrator: Jason Gabloff
  - Municipal clerk: Karen Bellamy

Area
  - Total: 18.01 sq mi (46.65 km^{2})
  - Land: 17.78 sq mi (46.06 km^{2})
  - Water: 0.23 sq mi (0.59 km^{2}) 1.27%
  - Rank: 158th of 565 in state 12th of 39 in county
- Elevation: 492 ft (150 m)

Population (2020)
  - Total: 6,016
  - Estimate (2023): 5,989
  - Rank: 346th of 565 in state 29th of 39 in county
  - Density: 338.3/sq mi (130.6/km^{2})
  - Rank: 468th of 565 in state 37th of 39 in county

Economics
  - Median income: $240,962 (± $21,849) (2018-2022)
- Time zone: UTC−05:00 (Eastern (EST))
  - Summer (DST): UTC−04:00 (Eastern (EDT))
- ZIP Code: 07945 – Mendham; 07869 – Randolph; 07926 – Brookside; 07931 – Far Hills; 07960 – Morristown
- Area code: 908, 973
- FIPS code: 3402745360
- GNIS feature ID: 0882200
- Website: www.mendhamtownship.org

Mendham Township is a township in southwestern Morris County, in the U.S. state of New Jersey, located more than 30 miles (48 km) due west of New York City. As of the 2020 United States census, the township's population was 6,016, an increase of 147 (+2.5%) from the 2010 census count of 5,869, which in turn reflected an increase of 469 (+8.7%) from the 5,400 counted in the 2000 census.

Located on the northern end of the Somerset Hills, Mendham Township is situated in the Raritan Valley region within the New York Metropolitan area. The township may be named for Mendham, Suffolk, England, or it may derive from the Native American word mendom (meaning "raspberry") or for an Earl of Mendham.

The long-established hamlets of Brookside and Ralston are located within Mendham, and both are listed on the National Register of Historic Places.

Along with Mendham Borough, the Mendhams have been described by The New York Times as "both affluent". The township has been one of the highest-income small municipalities in the United States. Based on data from the 2012-2016 American Community Survey, NJ.com ranked the township as having the third-highest income in the state, with a median household income of $176,875. Based on data from the ACS for 2014–2018, Mendham Township ranked fifth in the state with a median household income of $185,882. Per capita income, in comparison, was $131,795 as of the 2020 United States Census.

In 2010, Forbes.com listed Mendham as 224th in its listing of "America's Most Expensive ZIP Codes", with a median home price of $1,006,491.

== History ==
The township was formed on March 29, 1749, from portions of Hanover Township, Morris Township and Roxbury Township. After the Revolutionary War, on February 21, 1798, the township was incorporated by the Township Act of 1798 of the New Jersey Legislature as one of the state's initial group of 104 townships. Portions of the township were taken to create Randolph Township on January 1, 1806. Mendham Borough became an independent municipality when it was formed on May 15, 1906.

Natural resources of water, forests and minerals drew settlers to the area. The area of Ralston had iron forges, sawmills, and a gristmill by 1748, located in an area along the North Branch of the Raritan River. Northeast of Ralston is India Brook. On the eastern side of Mendham Township, brooks that formed the upper reaches of the Whippany River attracted settlers to the valley called Water Street or Waterville, later known as Brookside.

Following the Civil War, wealthy industrialists and financiers established country homes in the Morristown area and Bernardsville's "Mountain Colony", including in the Mendhams. Historic homes, structures, and local settlements are relics of the township's history as a community where people lived and worked in a rural community far from the city's "dark satanic mills".

== Geography ==
According to the United States Census Bureau, the township had a total area of 18.01 square miles (46.65 km^{2}), including 17.78 square miles (46.06 km^{2}) of land and 0.23 square miles (0.59 km^{2}) of water (1.27%).

Unincorporated communities, localities and place names located partially or completely within the township include Brookside, Colemans Hollow, Days Mills, Pleasant Valley, Ralston and Washington Corner.

The long-established hamlets of Brookside and Ralston are located within the township and both are listed among the National Register of Historic Places.

The township surrounds Mendham Borough on three sides and borders Morris Township to the east, Harding Township to the southeast, Randolph to the north and Chester Township to the west all of which are located in Morris County; Bernardsville lies to the south and Peapack-Gladstone lies to the southwest, both located in the Somerset Hills of Somerset County.

== Demographics ==
Historical population
Census	Pop.	Note	%±
1810	1,277		—
1820	1,326		3.8%
1830	1,315		−0.8%
1840	1,378		4.8%
1850	1,723		25.0%
1860	1,660		−3.7%
1870	1,573		−5.2%
1880	1,526		−3.0%
1890	1,266		−17.0%
1900	1,600		26.4%
1910	792	*	−50.5%
1920	699		−11.7%
1930	1,003		43.5%
1940	1,079		7.6%
1950	1,380		27.9%
1960	2,256		63.5%
1970	3,697		63.9%
1980	4,488		21.4%
1990	4,537		1.1%
2000	5,400		19.0%
2010	5,869		8.7%
2020	6,016		2.5%
2023 (est.)	5,989		−0.4%
Population sources: 1810–1920 1840 1850–1870; 1850 1870 1880–1890; 1890–1910 1910–1930; 1940–2000 2000; 2010 2020 * = Lost territory in previous decade.

=== 2010 census ===
The 2010 United States census counted 5,869 people, 1,952 households, and 1,659 families in the township. The population density was 328.4 per square mile (126.8/km^{2}). There were 2,062 housing units at an average density of 115.4 per square mile (44.6/km^{2}). The racial makeup was 93.32% (5,477) White, 1.29% (76) Black or African American, 0.05% (3) Native American, 3.41% (200) Asian, 0.00% (0) Pacific Islander, 0.56% (33) from other races, and 1.36% (80) from two or more races. Hispanic or Latino of any race were 3.60% (211) of the population.

Of the 1,952 households, 44.6% had children under the age of 18; 78.0% were married couples living together; 5.1% had a female householder with no husband present and 15.0% were non-families. Of all households, 12.7% were made up of individuals and 6.3% had someone living alone who was 65 years of age or older. The average household size was 2.99 and the average family size was 3.28.

30.2% of the population were under the age of 18, 5.1% from 18 to 24, 15.4% from 25 to 44, 36.7% from 45 to 64, and 12.5% who were 65 years of age or older. The median age was 44.6 years. For every 100 females, the population had 97.5 males. For every 100 females ages 18 and older there were 94.7 males.

The Census Bureau's 2006–2010 American Community Survey showed that (in 2010 inflation-adjusted dollars) median household income was $162,125 (with a margin of error of +/− $44,498) and the median family income was $194,028 (+/− $20,875). Males had a median income of $163,594 (+/− $46,204) versus $76,136 (+/− $53,301) for females. The per capita income for the borough was $93,011 (+/− $10,203). About 0.6% of families and 1.7% of the population were below the poverty line, including 1.2% of those under age 18 and none of those age 65 or over.

Mendham Township is one of the highest-income small municipalities in the United States and was ranked 7th in New Jersey in per capita income as of the 2010 Census. Based on data from the 2006-2010 American Community Survey, the township had a per capita income of $93,011 (ranked 7th in the state), compared to per capita income in Morris County of $47,342 and statewide of $34,858.

=== 2000 census ===
As of the 2000 United States census there were 5,400 people, 1,788 households, and 1,539 families residing in the township. The population density was 302.4 inhabitants per square mile (116.8/km^{2}). There were 1,849 housing units at an average density of 103.5 per square mile (40.0/km^{2}). The racial makeup of the township was 95.91% White, 0.93% African American, 0.09% Native American, 2.02% Asian, 0.35% from other races, and 0.70% from two or more races. Hispanic or Latino of any race were 1.52% of the population.

There were 1,788 households, out of which 47.0% had children under the age of 18 living with them, 80.2% were married couples living together, 4.0% had a female householder with no husband present, and 13.9% were non-families. 11.1% of all households were made up of individuals, and 4.6% had someone living alone who was 65 years of age or older. The average household size was 3.01 and the average family size was 3.27.

In the township the population was spread out, with 32.0% under the age of 18, 3.6% from 18 to 24, 23.8% from 25 to 44, 29.9% from 45 to 64, and 10.8% who were 65 years of age or older. The median age was 40 years. For every 100 females, there were 96.8 males. For every 100 females age 18 and over, there were 94.1 males.

The median income for a household in the township was $136,174, and the median income for a family was $146,254. Males had a median income of $100,000 versus $57,946 for females. The per capita income for the township was $61,460. About 1.4% of families and 1.8% of the population were below the poverty line, including 2.3% of those under age 18 and 0.9% of those age 65 or over.

Mendham Township was ranked in 2000 as the 17th-highest per capita income in the state of New Jersey, after having been ranked tenth a decade earlier. In 2000, the township's median household income ranked forth in the state and second highest in Morris County behind Mountain Lakes. Per capita income increased by 30.4% from the previous census, with income growth ranked 493rd among the state's 566 municipalities.

== Parks and recreation ==
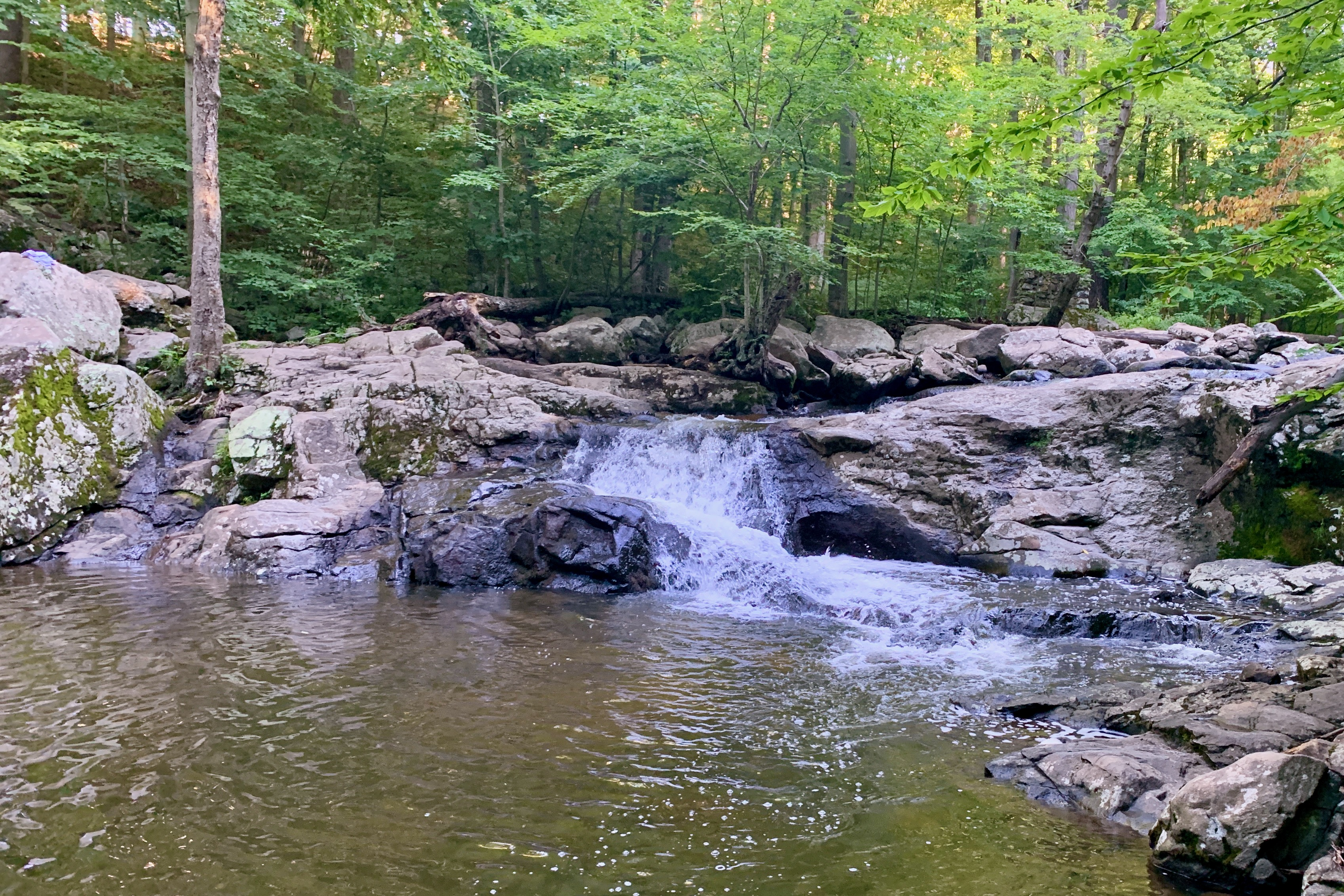
Buttermilk Falls in India Brook Park

In addition to the several parks in the township, there are miles of hiking trails, including the Patriots' Path, created by the county. India Brook Park, located off Ironia Road, has recreation fields and features a trail to Buttermilk Falls on the India Brook. The Schiff Nature Preserve, located off Pleasant Valley Road, offers nature programs and has several hiking trails.

== Government ==
=== Local government ===
Mendham Township operates under the township form of New Jersey municipal government, one of 141 municipalities (of the 564) statewide that use this form, the second most commonly used form of government in the state. The Township Committee is comprised of five members, who are elected directly by the voters at-large in partisan elections to serve three-year terms of office on a staggered basis, with either one or two seats coming up for election each year as part of the November general election in a three-year cycle. At an annual reorganization meeting held on the first Monday after January 1, the newly reconstituted township committee selects one of its members to serve as mayor, and another to serve as deputy mayor.

As of 2026, members of the Mendham Township Committee are Mayor Sarah Neibart (R, 2027; term as mayor ends December 31, 2026), Deputy Nick Monaghan (R, 2027; term as deputy mayor ends 2026), Amalia Duarte (D, 2026), Tracy Moreen (R, 2028) and Lauren Spirig (D, 2028).

In February 2023, Republicans dropped a challenge to the election of Democrat Lauren Spirig, who won the second seat on the committee up for election in November 2022, three votes ahead of incumbent Republican committee member Thomas Baio, who claimed that there had been votes cast by individuals who no longer resided in the township and were thus ineligible to vote.

Former township committeeman Brian Phelan was inducted into the New Jersey State Elected Officials Hall of Fame in 2011.

=== Federal, state, and county representation ===
Mendham Township is located in the 7th and 11th Congressional Districts and is part of New Jersey's 25th state legislative district.

For the 119th United States Congress, New Jersey's 7th congressional district is represented by Thomas Kean Jr. (R, Westfield). For the 119th United States Congress, New Jersey's 11th congressional district is represented by Analilia Mejia (D, Glen Ridge) who was elected in a 2026 special election to serve for the remainder of the Congress following the resignation Mikie Sherrill (D, Montclair), who was elected Governor of New Jersey in 2025. New Jersey is represented in the United States Senate by Democrats Cory Booker (Newark, term ends 2027) and Andy Kim (Moorestown, term ends 2031).

For the 2026–2027 session, the 25th legislative district of the New Jersey Legislature is represented in the State Senate by Anthony M. Bucco (R, Boonton Township) and in the General Assembly by Aura K. Dunn (R, Mendham Borough) and Marisa Sweeney (D, Morristown).

Morris County is governed by a Board of County Commissioners comprised of seven members who are elected at-large in partisan elections to three-year terms on a staggered basis, with either one or three seats up for election each year as part of the November general election. Actual day-to-day operation of departments is supervised by County Administrator Deena Leary.

As of 2026, Morris County's Commissioners (with all terms ending December 31) are Director Stephen H. Shaw (R, Mountain Lakes, 2027), Deputy Director John Krickus (R, Washington Township, 2027), Douglas Cabana (R, Boonton Township, 2028), Thomas J. Mastrangelo (R, Montville, 2028), Christine Myers (R, Harding Township, 2028), Tayfun Selen (R, Chatham Township, 2026), and Deborah Smith (R, Denville Township, 2027).

The county's constitutional officers are County Clerk Ann F. Grossi (R, Parsippany–Troy Hills, 2028), Sheriff James M. Gannon (R, Boonton Township, 2025) and Surrogate Heather Darling (R, Roxbury, 2029).

=== Politics ===
Presidential election results

United States presidential election results for Mendham Township
Year	Republican		Democratic		Third party(ies)	
Year	No.	%	No.	%	No.	%
2024	1,730	45.60%	1,995	52.58%	69	1.82%
2020	1,849	45.50%	2,144	52.76%	71	1.75%
2016	1,776	50.61%	1,603	45.68%	130	3.70%
2012	2,108	64.54%	1,130	34.60%	28	0.86%
2008	2,080	58.39%	1,461	41.02%	21	0.59%
2004	2,203	62.60%	1,296	36.83%	20	0.57%
2000	1,981	62.93%	1,069	33.96%	98	3.11%
1996	1,783	63.27%	853	30.27%	182	6.46%
1992	1,776	60.68%	779	26.61%	372	12.71%
1988	2,021	76.29%	608	22.95%	20	0.76%
1984	2,023	77.69%	571	21.93%	10	0.38%
1980	1,670	67.50%	459	18.55%	345	13.95%
1976	1,760	74.61%	562	23.82%	37	1.57%
1972	1,575	73.77%	534	25.01%	26	1.22%
1968	1,171	69.54%	414	24.58%	99	5.88%
1964	708	54.46%	588	45.23%	4	0.31%
1960	750	58.46%	533	41.54%	0	0.00%
1956	823	85.82%	136	14.18%	0	0.00%
1952	707	87.18%	104	12.82%	0	0.00%

As of June 4, 2024, there were a total of 5,264 registered voters in Mendham Township, of which 1,505 (28.59%) were registered as Democrats, 1,960 (37.23%) were registered as Republicans and 1,799 (34.18%) were registered as Unaffiliated.

Gubernatorial election results for Mendham Township
Year	Republican		Democratic		Third party(ies)	
Year	No.	%	No.	%	No.	%
2025	1,558	48.98%	1,615	50.77%	8	0.25%
2021	1,521	54.36%	1,260	45.03%	17	0.61%
2017	1,305	57.54%	932	41.09%	31	1.37%
2013	1,795	80.86%	400	18.02%	25	1.13%
2009	1,914	68.11%	666	23.70%	230	8.19%
2005	1,494	64.09%	786	33.72%	51	2.19%

In the 2021 gubernatorial election, Republican Jack Ciattarelli received 54.4% (1,521 votes), ahead of Democrat Phil Murphy with 45% (1,260 votes), and other candidates with .6% (17 votes), among the 2,825 ballots cast by the township's 5,527 registered voters, for a turnout of 51.1%. In the 2017 gubernatorial election, Republican Kim Guadagno received 57.5% (1,305 votes), ahead of Democrat Phil Murphy with 41.1% (932 votes), and other candidates with 1.4% (31 votes), among the 2,292 ballots cast by the township's 4,982 registered voters, for a turnout of 46.0%. In the 2013 gubernatorial election, Republican Chris Christie, a resident of the township, received 80.9% of the vote (1,795 cast), ahead of Democrat Barbara Buono with 18.0% (400 votes), and other candidates with 1.1% (25 votes), among the 2,242 ballots cast by the township's 4,624 registered voters (22 ballots were spoiled), for a turnout of 48.5%. In the 2009 gubernatorial election, Republican Chris Christie received 67.4% of the vote (1,914 ballots cast), ahead of Democrat Jon Corzine with 23.5% (666 votes), Independent Chris Daggett with 8.0% (227 votes) and other candidates with 0.1% (3 votes), among the 2,838 ballots cast by the township's 4,547 registered voters, yielding a 62.4% turnout.

United States Senate election results for Mendham Township1
Year	Republican		Democratic		Third party(ies)	
Year	No.	%	No.	%	No.	%
2024	1,843	49.30%	1,838	49.17%	57	1.52%
2018	1,754	56.89%	1,252	40.61%	77	2.50%
2012	2,035	65.60%	1,032	33.27%	35	1.13%
2006	1,591	63.46%	896	35.74%	20	0.80%

United States Senate election results for Mendham Township2
Year	Republican		Democratic		Third party(ies)	
Year	No.	%	No.	%	No.	%
2020	2,056	51.08%	1,934	48.05%	35	0.87%
2014	1,259	61.03%	775	37.57%	29	1.41%
2013	937	59.76%	621	39.60%	10	0.64%
2008	2,177	65.45%	1,115	33.52%	34	1.02%

== Education ==
Public school students in pre-kindergarten through eighth grade attend the Mendham Township Public Schools. As of the 2020–21 school year, the district, comprised of two schools, had an enrollment of 745 students and 73.9 classroom teachers (on an FTE basis), for a student–teacher ratio of 10.1:1. Schools in the district (with 2020–2021 enrollment data from the National Center for Education Statistics) are Mendham Township Elementary School with 429 students in grades Pre-K–4 and Mendham Township Middle School with 313 students in grades 5–8.

Mendham Township Middle School was one of 11 in the state to be recognized in 2014 by the United States Department of Education's National Blue Ribbon Schools Program. Mendham Township Elementary School was honored by the National Blue Ribbon Schools Program in 2019, one of nine schools in the state recognized as Exemplary High Performing Schools.

Students in public school for ninth through twelfth grades attend West Morris Mendham High School, which is located in Mendham Borough and serves students from Chester Borough, Chester Township, Mendham Borough and Mendham Township. The school is part of the West Morris Regional High School District, which also serves students from Washington Township at West Morris Central High School. As of the 2020–21 school year, the high school had an enrollment of 1,142 students and 91.9 classroom teachers (on an FTE basis), for a student–teacher ratio of 12.4:1. The district's board of education is comprised nine members who are elected directly by voters to serve three-year terms of office on a staggered basis. The nine seats on the board of education are allocated based on the populations of the constituent municipalities, with one seat assigned to Mendham Township.

== Transportation ==
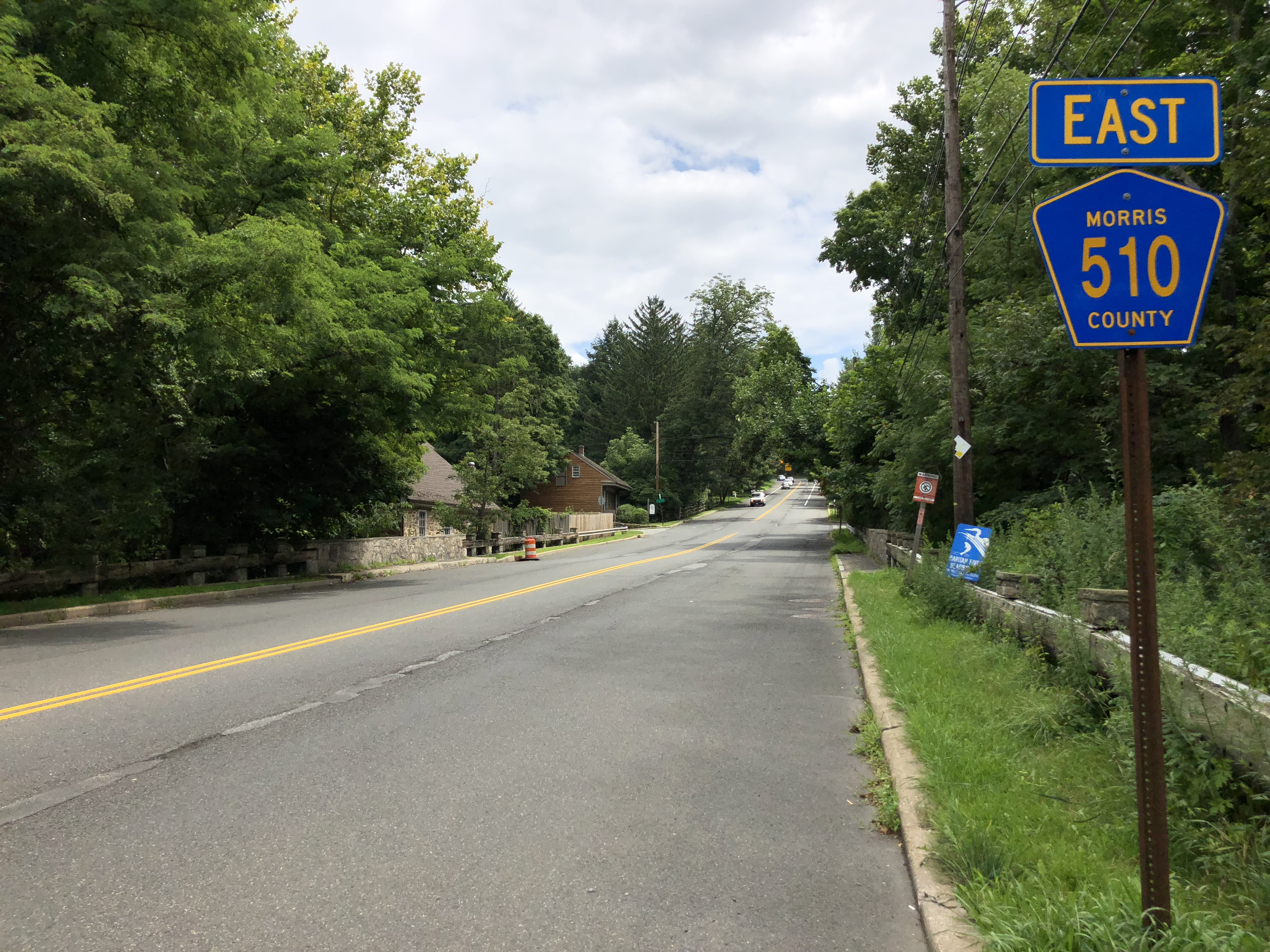
County Route 510 eastbound in Mendham Township

=== Roads and highways ===
As of May 2010, the township had a total of 70.70 miles (113.78 km) of roadways, of which 63.51 miles (102.21 km) were maintained by the municipality and 7.19 miles (11.57 km) by Morris County.

No Interstate, U.S. or state highways pass directly through Mendham Township. The most significant roadway directly serving the township is County Route 510. For those heading to points outside the township, Interstate 287, Interstate 80, and Interstate 78, are all accessible nearby.

=== Public transportation ===
NJ Transit offered service on the MCM4 and MCM5 routes until 2010, when subsidies to the local provider were eliminated as part of budget cuts.

Commuters traveling via public transportation can drive to the Morristown station to access New Jersey Transit Midtown Direct express train line into Midtown Manhattan.

== Notable people ==
People who were born in, residents of, or otherwise closely associated with Mendham Township include:

- Chris Christie (born 1962), former New Jersey Governor and United States Attorney
- Samuel Cochran (1871–1952), medical missionary and philanthropist who worked for over 20 years in Eastern China
- Peter Dinklage (born 1969), Emmy and Golden Globe-winning actor who starred in The Station Agent, Elf and Game of Thrones
- Abner Doubleday (1819–1893), Civil War general and apocryphal inventor of baseball
- Sean Duffy (born 1971), currently serving as the 20th United States Secretary of Transportation under the second presidency of Donald Trump.
- Alice Weaver Flaherty (born 1963), neurologist and writer
- Morris Frank (1908–1980), co-founder of The Seeing Eye
- William "Green Bar Bill" Hillcourt (1900–1992), author and national official of the Boy Scouts of America, at nearby Schiff Scout Reservation from the 1930s to the 1970s
- Whitney Houston (1963–2012), singer
- Rick Merkt (born 1949), politician who represented the 25th Legislative District in the New Jersey General Assembly from 1998 to 2010
- Anne M. Patterson (born 1959), Associate Justice of the New Jersey Supreme Court
- Stewart G. Pollock (born 1932), Justice of the Supreme Court of New Jersey from 1979 to 1999
- Joachim Prinz (1902–1988), German-American rabbi and activist, who was an outspoken Zionist and a leader in the US civil rights movement in the 1960s
- Arthur Whitney (1871–1942), politician who served in both houses of the New Jersey Legislature and was the Republican nominee for Governor of New Jersey in 1925
- Temperance Wick (1758–1822), American Revolutionary War heroine
