= Nathan A. Cooper =

American landowner, businessman, and military officer from Chester Township, New Jersey

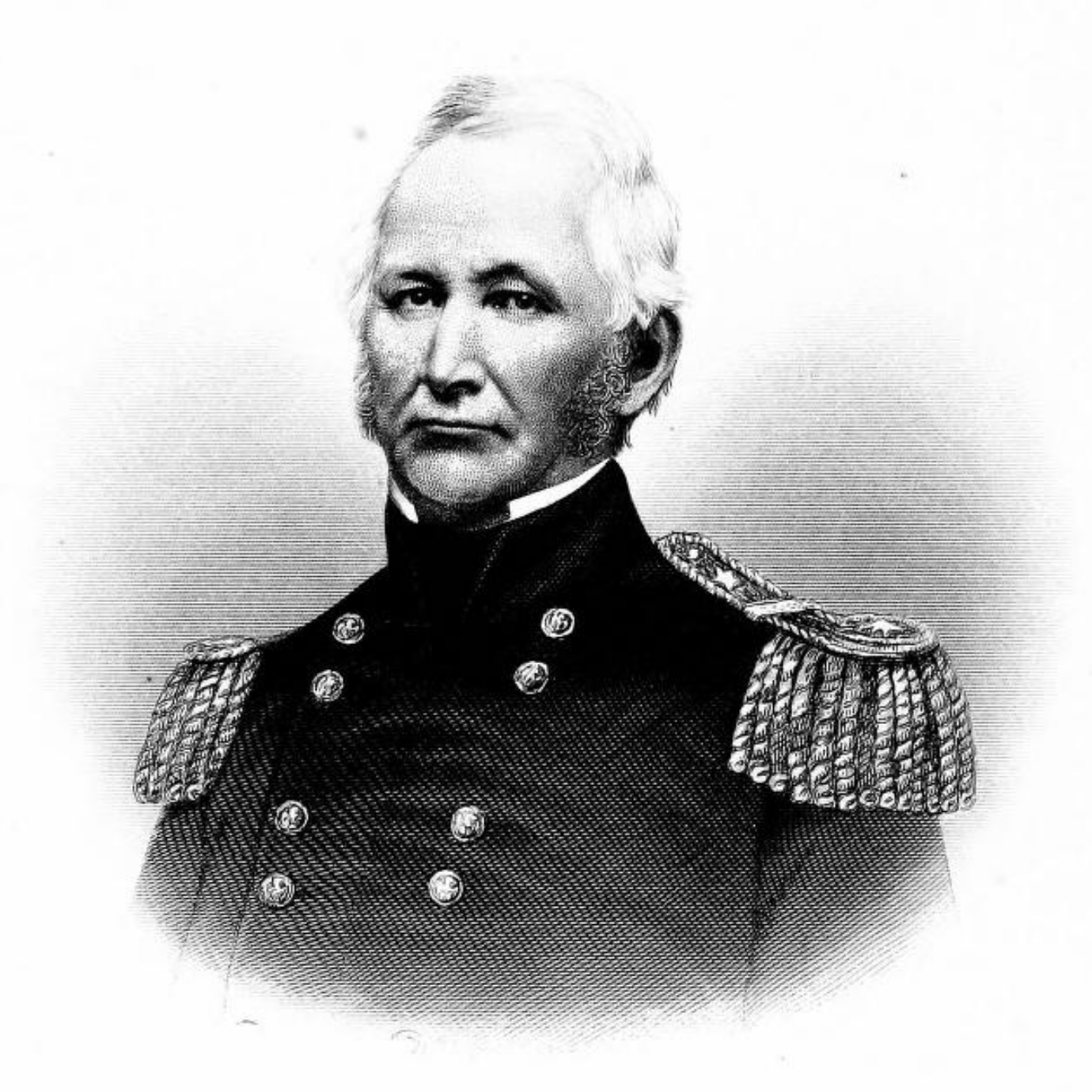
- Born: April 29, 1802; Chester Township, New Jersey, US
- Died: July 25, 1879 (aged 77)
- Buried: Pleasant Hill Cemetery
- Branch: Morris County Cavalry
- Rank: Brigadier General

General Nathan A. Cooper (April 29, 1802 – July 25, 1879) was an American landowner, businessman, and military officer from Chester Township, New Jersey.

== Biography ==
Nathan A. Cooper was born on April 29, 1802, to Anna Wills and Abraham Cooper in Chester Township. He had a sister, Beulah Ann Cooper, who married Henry Seward.

When he was 16 years old, his father died. Cooper inherited the family estate, consisting of 1,600 acres (650 ha), originally purchased by his uncle, Nathan Cooper.

In 1826, his uncle built a new mill, now known as the Nathan Cooper Gristmill. Nathan A. inherited this mill when uncle Nathan died. By 1854, he was commissioned a Brigadier General of the state cavalry. In 1860, he built the General Nathan Cooper Mansion.

In 1841, Cooper's stallion Messenger won first prize "for the best stud horse" at the American Institute Fair. The Cultivator reported that Cooper's prize was a "gold medal or silver cup of the value of $15."

He married Mary Henrietta Leddell in 1843. He died on July 25, 1879, and is buried at the Pleasant Hill Cemetery in Chester.

== Gallery ==
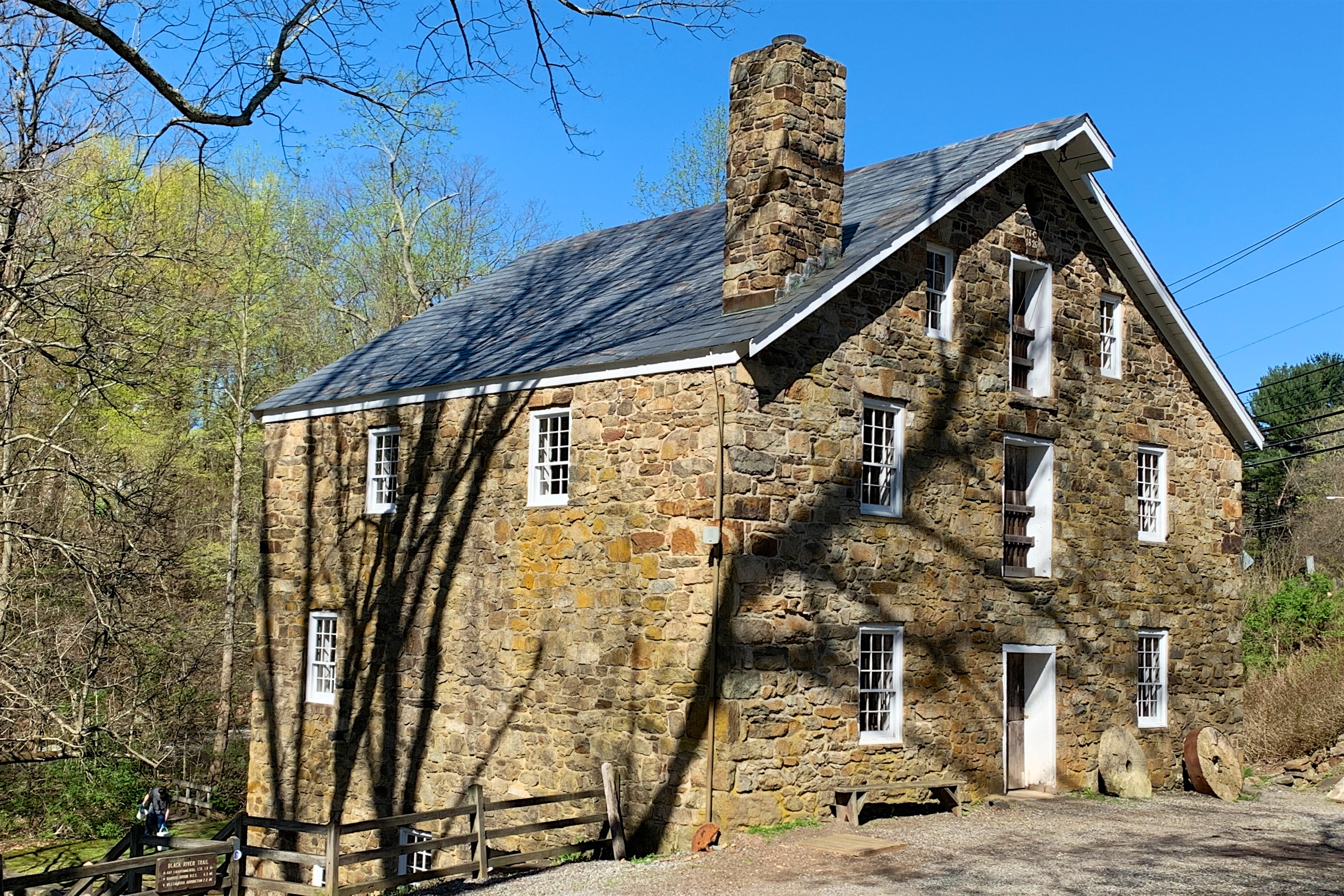
Nathan Cooper Gristmill on the Black River

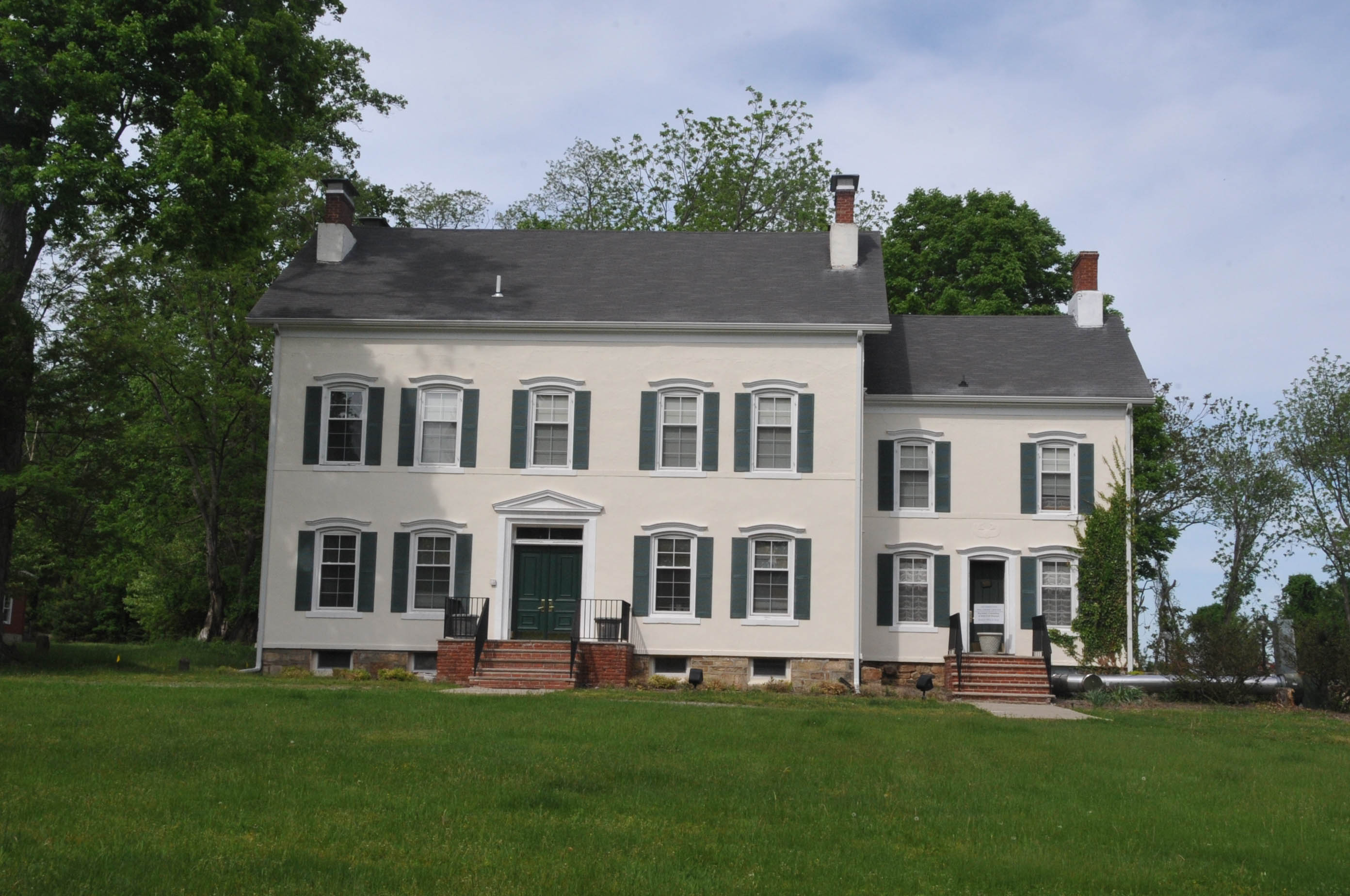
General Nathan Cooper Mansion

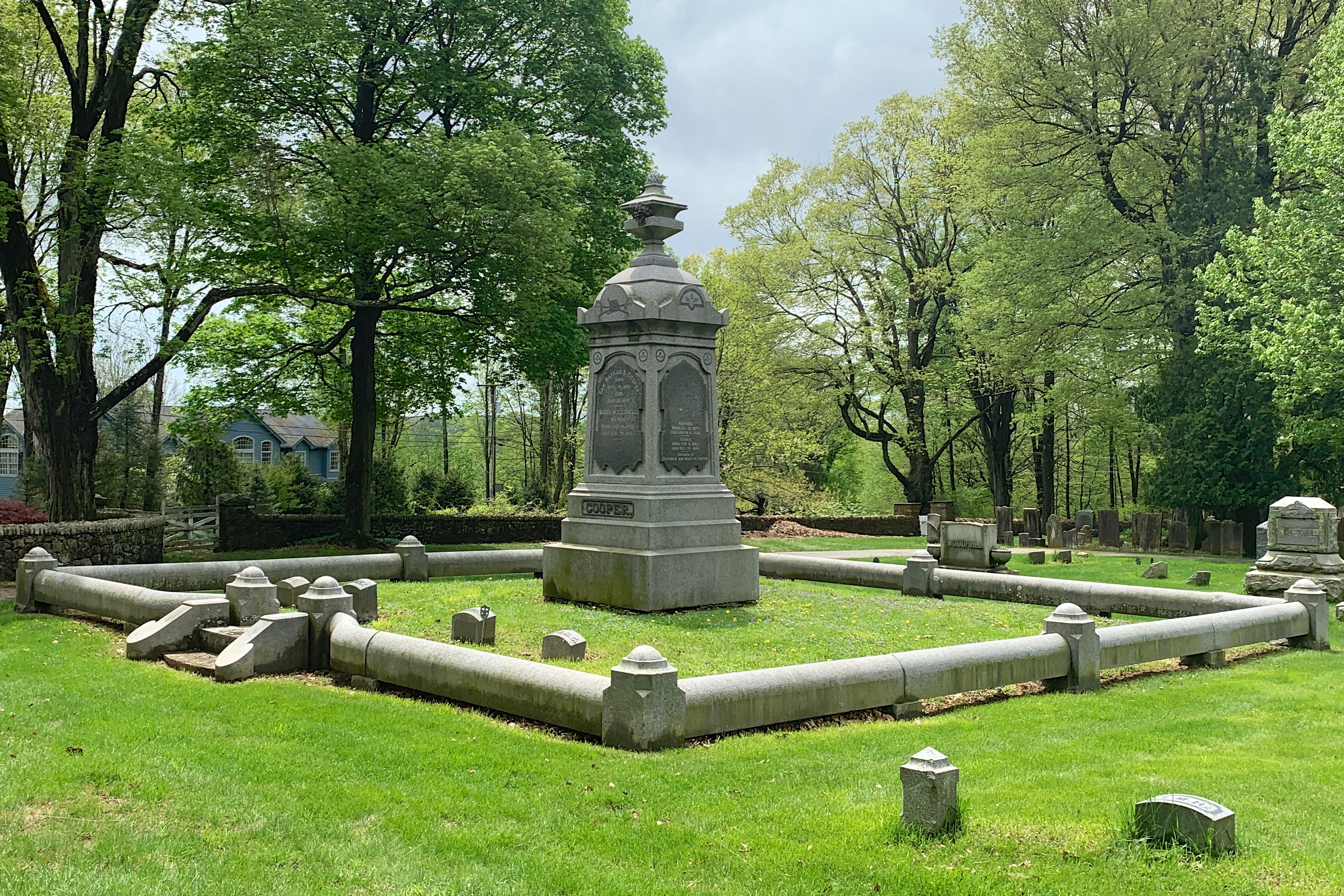
Family gravesite of Nathan A. Cooper at Pleasant Hill Cemetery

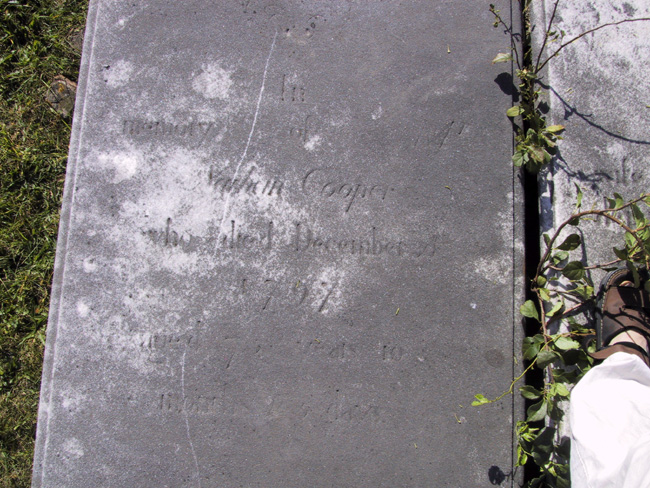
Grave of his grandfather, Nathan Cooper (1725–1797), at Chester Cemetery
