= General Nathan Cooper Mansion =

Historic house in Chester Township, New Jersey

- U.S. National Register of Historic Places
- New Jersey Register of Historic Places
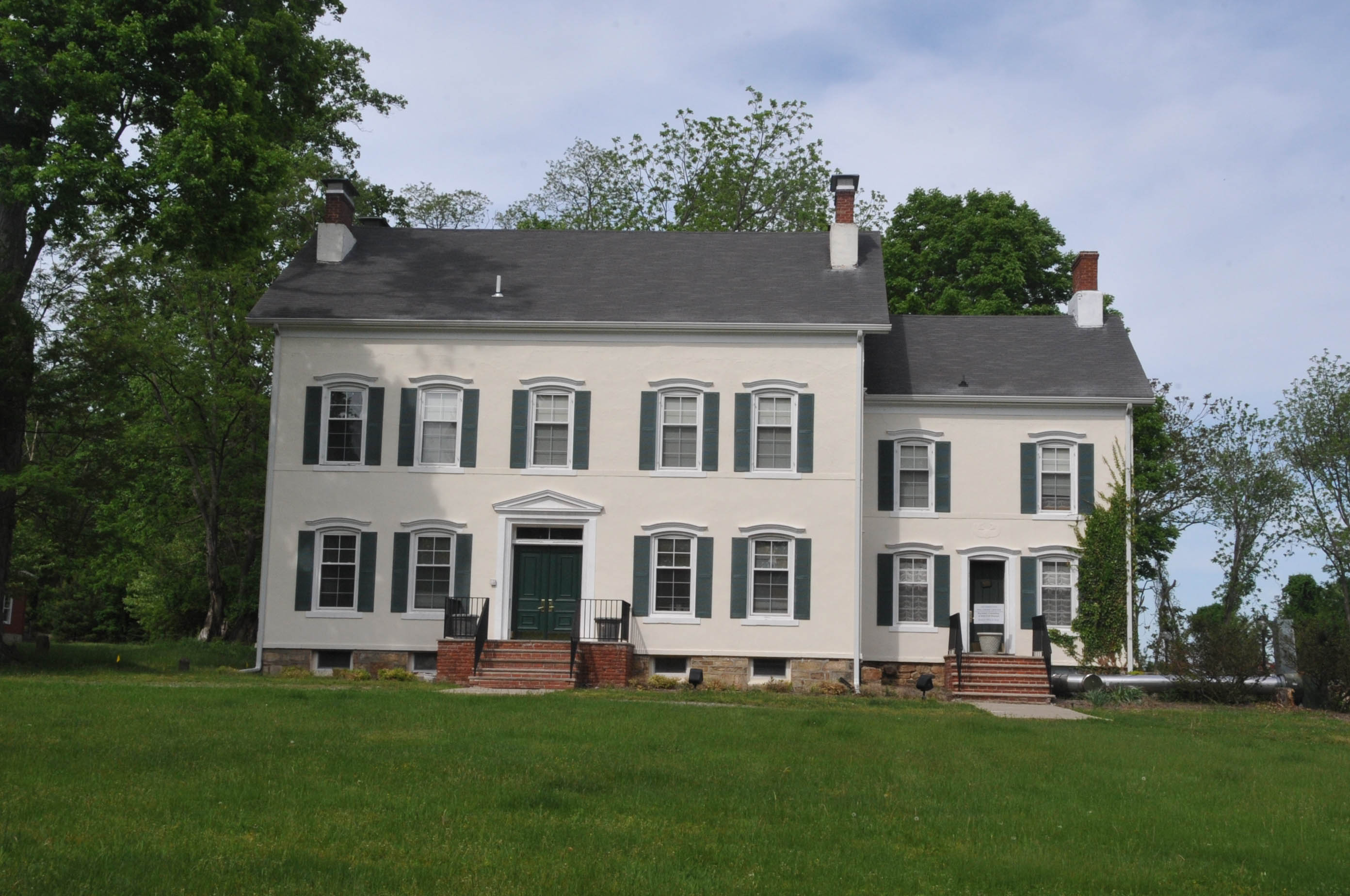

- Location within Morris County, New Jersey Location within New Jersey Location within the United States
- Location: NJ Route 24; Chester Township, New Jersey
- Coordinates: 40°46′45″N 74°40′04″W
- Area: 5 acres (2.0 ha)
- Built: 1860
- Architectural style: Late Victorian
- NRHP reference No.: 78001781
- NJRHP No.: 2102

Significant dates
- Added to NRHP: December 29, 1978
- Designated NJRHP: October 13, 1978

The General Nathan Cooper Mansion is a historic house in Chester Township, Morris County, New Jersey and was the home of Nathan A. Cooper (1802–1879). It was added to the National Register of Historic Places on November 21, 1976 for its significance in architecture and military/political history.

== History and description ==
In 1860, Cooper built this two and one-half story Victorian mansion. The nomination form notes that "the brick, sand, lime and timber used in the building were all produced or manufactured on the Cooper Estate".

== See also ==
- National Register of Historic Places listings in Morris County, New Jersey
- Nathan Cooper Gristmill
