= First Congregational Church (Chester, New Jersey) =

Historic church in Chester Borough, New Jersey

- U.S. National Register of Historic Places
- New Jersey Register of Historic Places
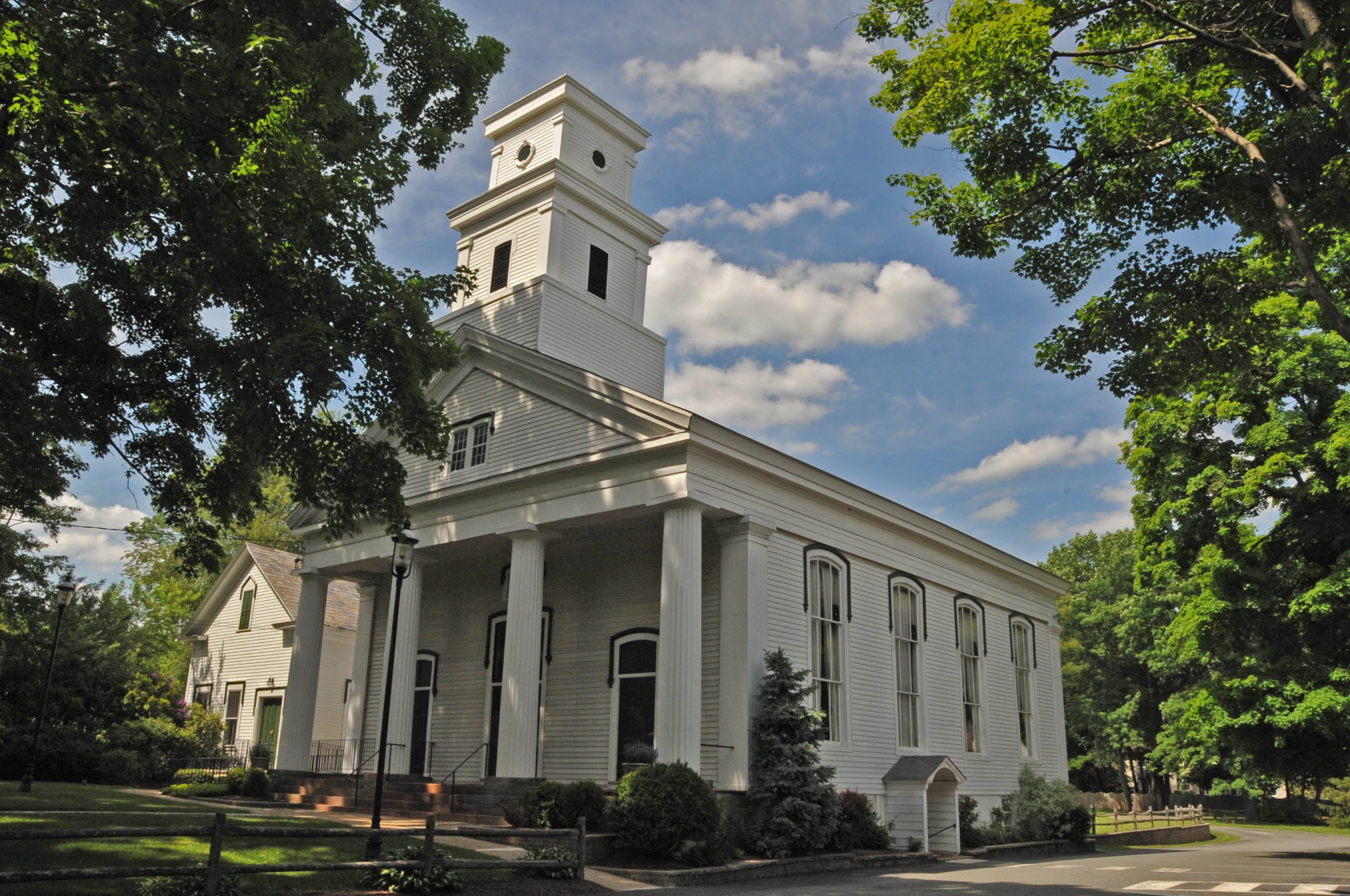

- Location within Morris County, New Jersey Location within New Jersey Location within the United States
- Location: 30 Hillside Road; Chester Borough, New Jersey
- Coordinates: 40°47′14″N 74°41′45″W
- Area: 2.3 acres (0.93 ha)
- Built: 1856
- Architectural style: Greek Revival
- NRHP reference No.: 77000892
- NJRHP No.: 2100

Significant dates
- Added to NRHP: August 10, 1977
- Designated NJRHP: August 2, 1976

First Congregational Church is a historic church located at 30 Hillside Road in Chester Borough, New Jersey. The congregation was founded in 1740. The church building was added to the National Register of Historic Places on August 10, 1977, for its significance in architecture, art, and religion.

== History and description ==
The Greek Revival temple church was built in 1856. It is the third building used by the congregation; the first was built in 1747, and the second in 1803. It features a full portico with pediment and four Doric columns. The interior decoration was painted 1857–1870 with Trompe-l'œil style. In 1873, an Opius 128 organ built by the J. H & C. S. Odell firm was installed.

== Social Action ==
The church has fundraised for a variety of causes, including:

- Dayspring Ministries, a Christian organisation which supports a school, orphanage, food program and family health clinic in haiti
- Good News Home for Women, a drug and alcohol rehabilitation center for adult women
- Market Street Mission, which provides support to the "homeless, helpless, and hopeless"
- Carmen Ministries, who organise bible study sessions for incarcerated and ex-incarcerated men to help improve their lives and stop repeat offences
- Child Evangelism Fellowship, who provide opportunities to connect young people with God
- Free food to members of the local community
- Support for local people living in desperate poverty

== Gallery ==
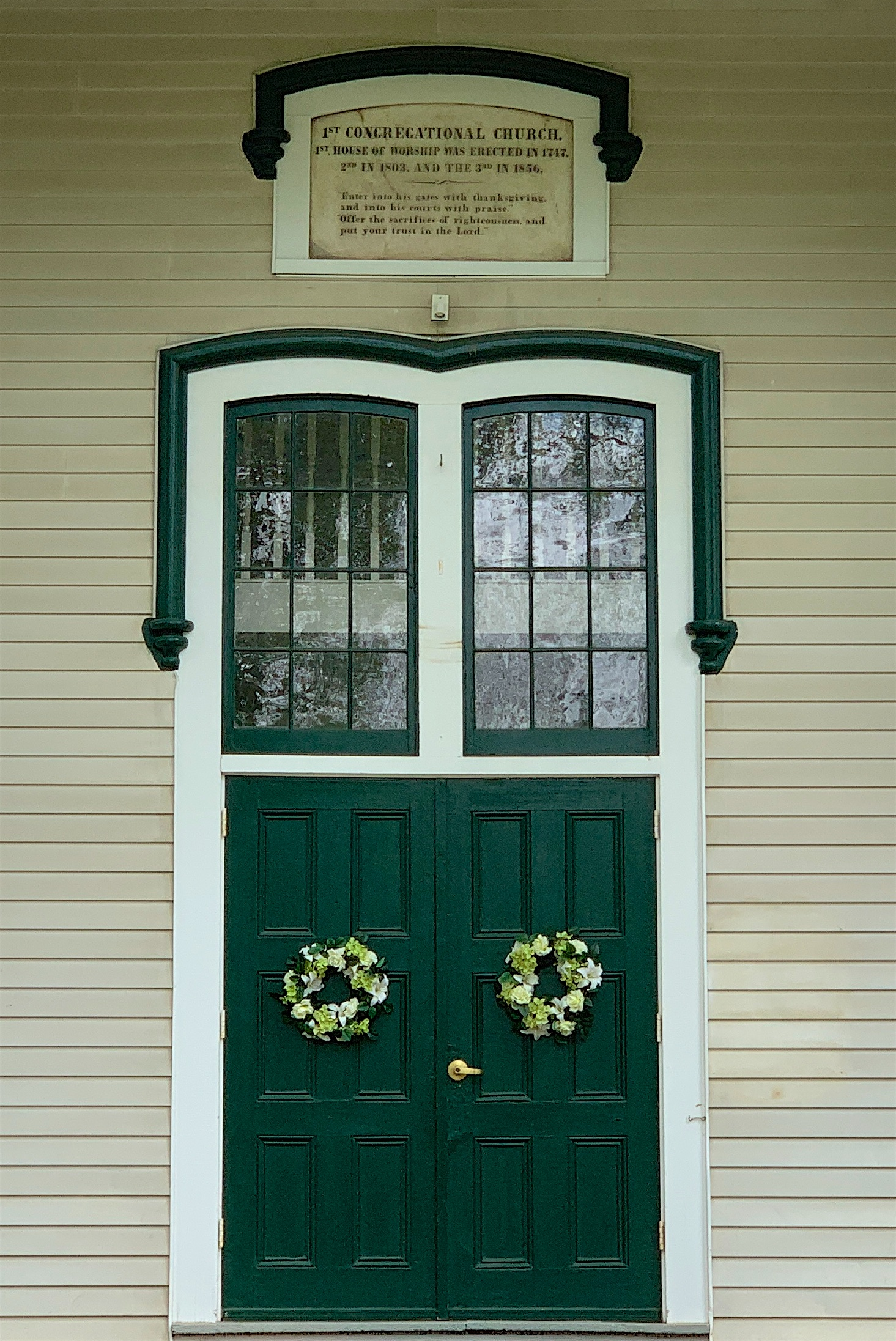
Front door with church history above

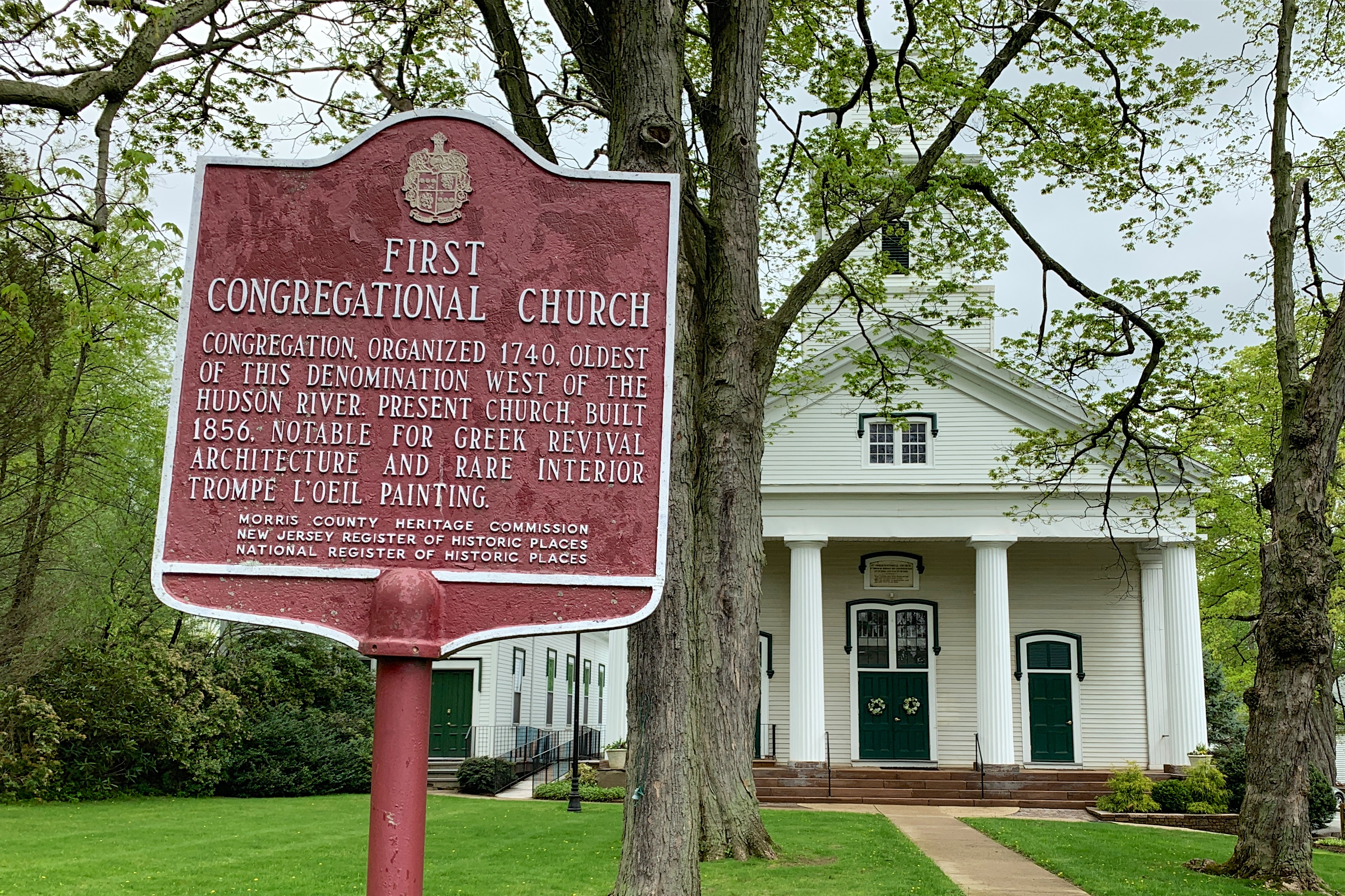
Morris County historical information

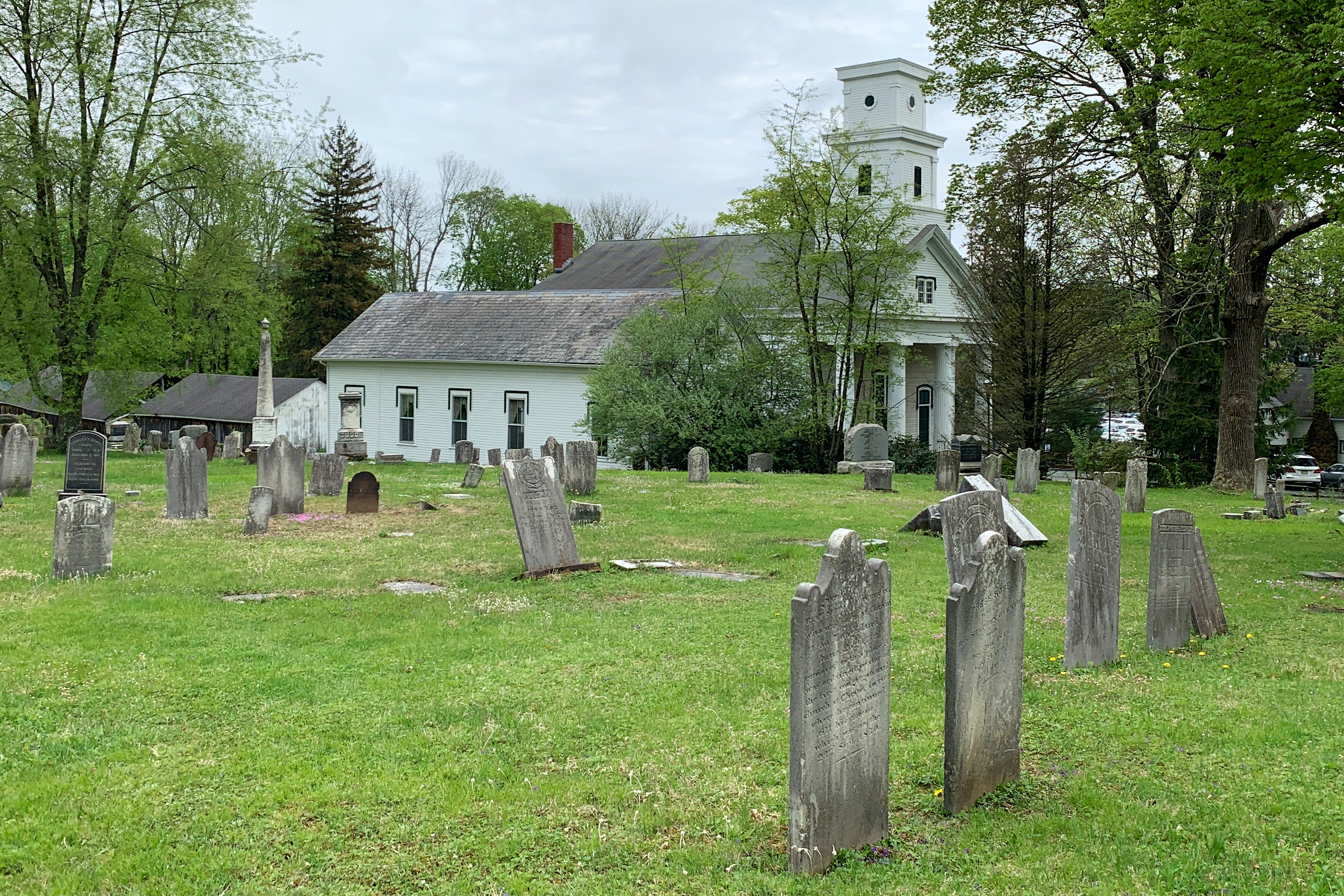
Chester Cemetery

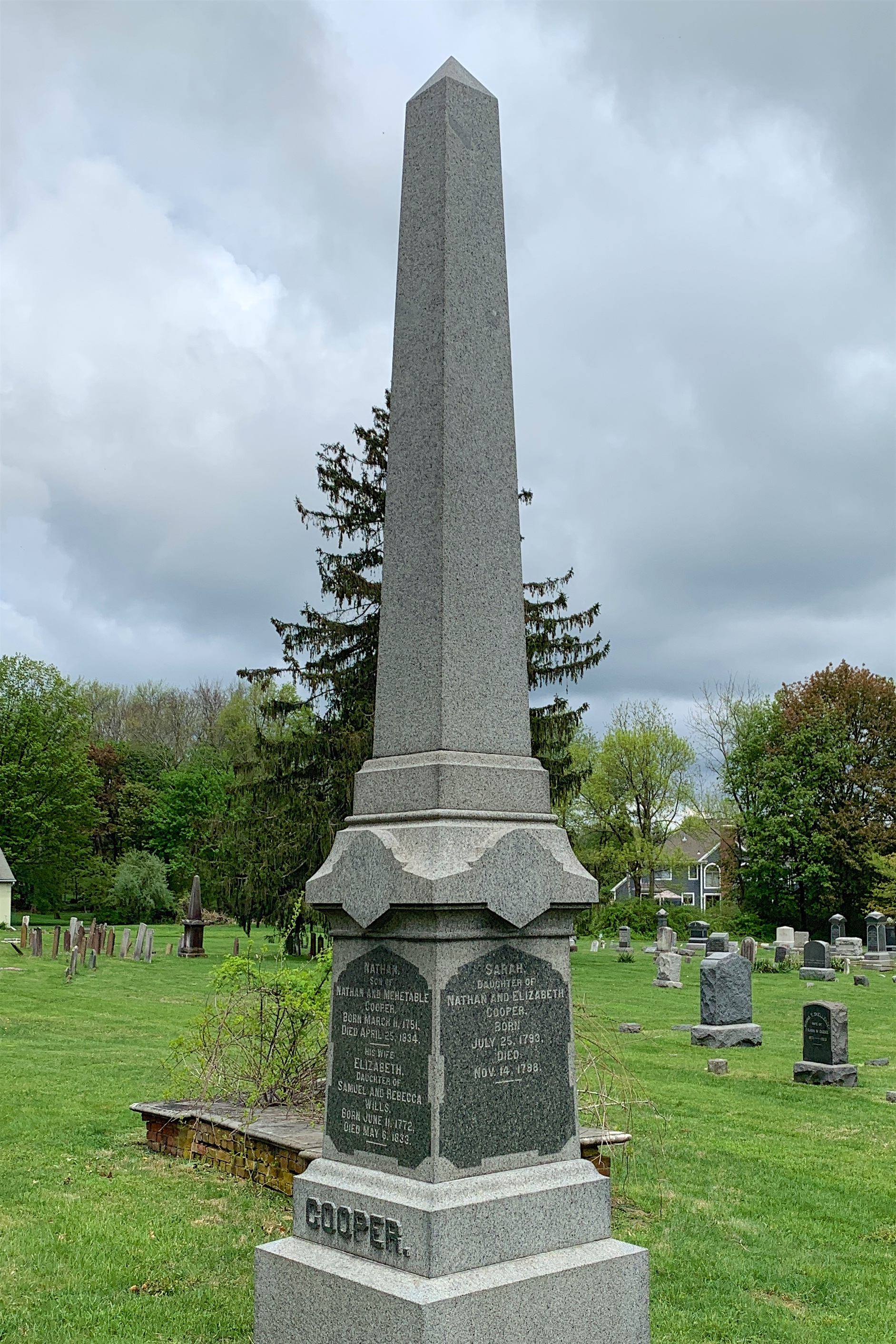
Nathan Cooper (1751–1834) family monument

== See also ==
- National Register of Historic Places listings in Morris County, New Jersey
- Nathan A. Cooper
