= Nathan Cooper Gristmill =

Historic gristmill in Chester Township, New Jersey

- U.S. National Register of Historic Places
- New Jersey Register of Historic Places
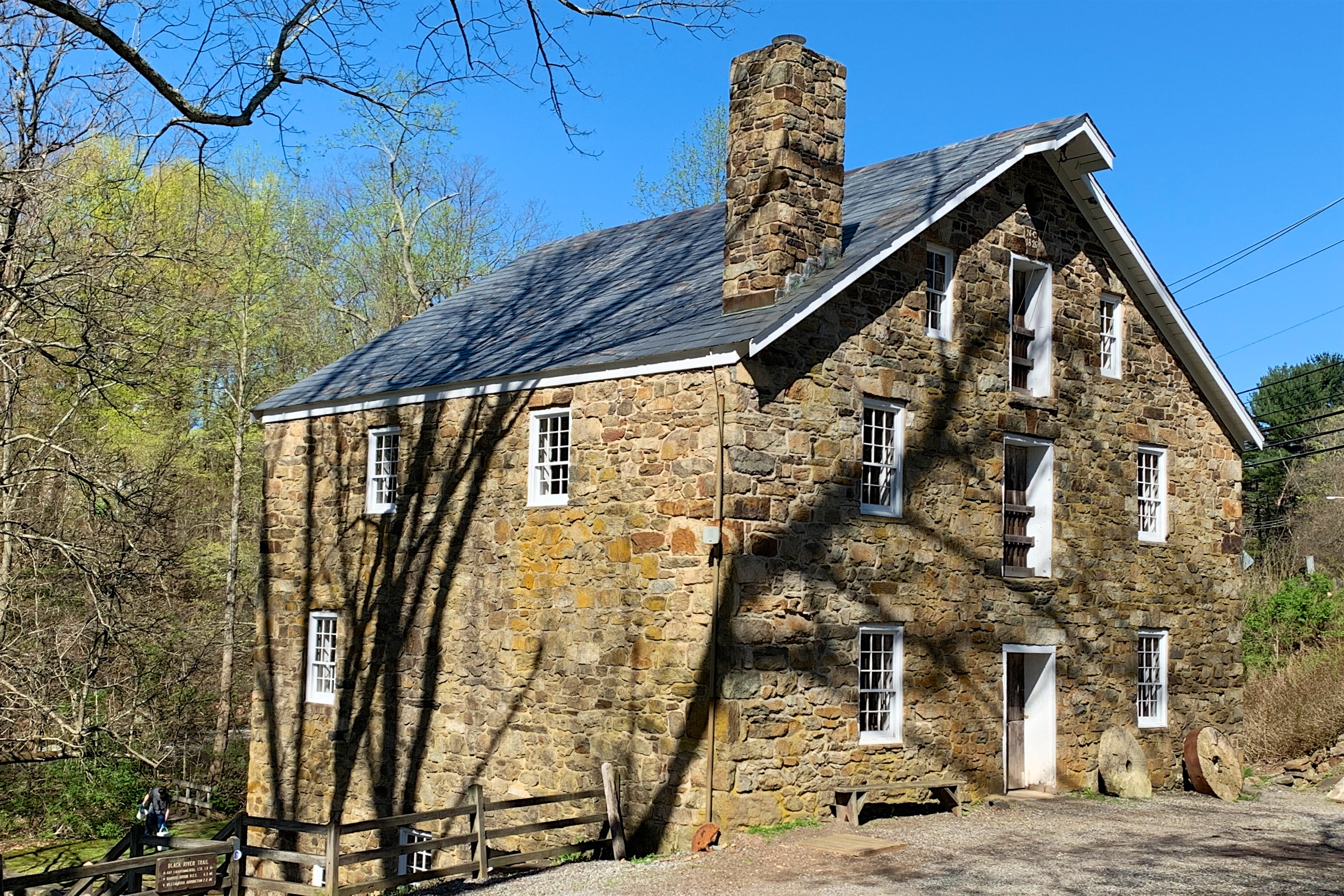
- Nathan Cooper Gristmil in 2019

- Location within Morris County, New Jersey Location within New Jersey Location within the United States
- Location: 66 NJ Route 24; Chester Township, New Jersey
- Coordinates: 40°46′44″N 74°43′16″W
- Area: 1 acre (0.40 ha)
- Built: 1826
- NRHP reference No.: 76001174
- NJRHP No.: 2101

Significant dates
- Added to NRHP: November 21, 1976
- Designated NJRHP: November 25, 1975

The Nathan Cooper Gristmill is a historic gristmill on the Black River located at 66 NJ Route 24 in Chester Township, Morris County, New Jersey. It was added to the National Register of Historic Places on November 21, 1976 for its significance in industry.

Since 1973, the Morris County Park Commission has owned and operated the mill and its 14 surrounding acres as a historic site.

== History ==
=== 18th century ===
Circa the 1760s, county judge Isaiah Younglove constructed a no-longer-extant mill on the Black River. Younglove's mill began flour milling production on the site. Images of America: Chester claims Younglove's mill burned down in an unspecified year, while the Morris County Park Commission describes his endeavor as having shut down in 1788. The mill then went through several owners before 1825. The last owner prior to the Coopers was Elias Howell.

=== 19th century heyday ===
In 1825, retired general Nathan Cooper (1751–1834) purchased the 4.5 acres of land for $750. This included "a milldam, sawmill, an old gristmill, and [a wooden] water wheel." This was an addition to his wealth, as he too had the ownership of over 1600 acres of land including multiple mines under Cooper, Hewitt, & Co.

The following year, Cooper rebuilt the mill, constructing a four-story random fieldstone gristmill to replace the 1760s structure. The new building employed the use of "four sets of millstones connected by elevators to grain cleaners and flour sifters." These incorporated the designs of American inventor Oliver Evans. The mill could grind up to 10 tons per day of wheat, corn, and other grains. Also in 1826, Nathan Cooper gave the property to his adult nephew, Nathan A. Cooper, who had become a NJ cavalry general 2 years before.

In 1827 and 1829, Nathan Cooper "raised the height of the dam as it stood."

Nathan A. Cooper commissioned a house to be constructed nearby for his son, Abram W. Cooper (1848–1933) as a wedding present.

In the 1870s, the Coopers installed modern turbines to replace the original wooden waterwheels.

Upon Nathan A. Cooper's 1879 death, Abram W. Cooper (one of his nine children) inherited ownership of the mill. Abram W. Cooper was described contemporaneously as a man whose "life had been quiet and uneventful, but upright and honorable...devoted to his business interests and the requirements of citizenship."

Later, Nathan A. Cooper (1802–1879) inherited this mill when his uncle Nathan died.

In the 1880s, Milltown experienced bustling economic success, and the Cooper mill "played a key role in the community and the region's industrial development." The mill shared Main Street with "a blacksmith shop, a general store, a tavern...and the Mountain Spring Distillery, a cider mill." The Coopers used their growing wealth to build family mansions in nearby Chester.

The mill continued to grind grain into flour until 1913.

=== 20th century ===
On January 31, 1913, the Milltown general store across the street burned down in a fire. The same year, the mill ceased to operate. In an unknown year, the Old Mill Tavern pub was built atop the site of the Milltown general store.

=== Museum conversion ===
In 1973, the Morris County Park Commission acquired the mill. After the acquisition, the mill was restored and Abram Cooper's home was converted into a Visitors' Center. The site opened to the public in October 1978. Visitors of the mill museum take home "stone-ground flour and cornmeal produced at the Gristmill."

After its acquisition in 1973, the Morris County Park Commission converted the Abram Cooper home into a Visitors' Center. The mill has since been kept in operating condition, being preserved as it was in the 1880s "with some updates" including the addition of electricity and a new water wheel. Its current wheel is an "all-steel-Fitz Company waterwheel" from 1927.

During Hurricane Irene in 2011, multiple local rivers flooded including the Black River. However, the mill was left undamaged due to its strategic elevated placement to avoid flooding, a feature of most historic mills.

In 2010, it was New Jersey's only restored water-powered mill. This claim was falsified by the 2020 restoration of the Red Mill in Clinton, New Jersey.

The Friends of Fosterfields and Cooper Gristmill, a non-profit organization, contributes money and expertise to run the mill. It is open April through October and offers several educational programs and summer camps.

== Gallery ==
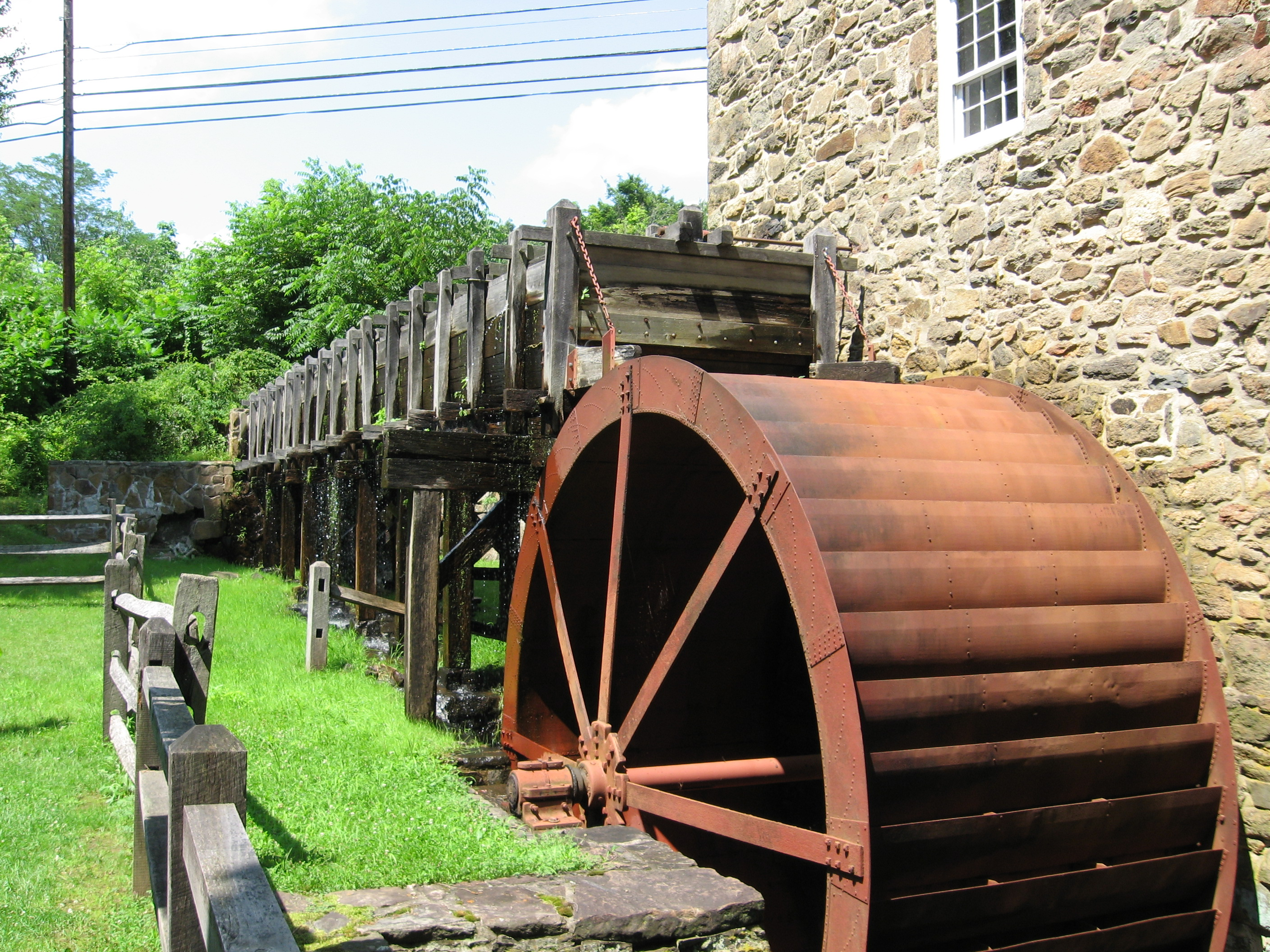
Steel water wheel

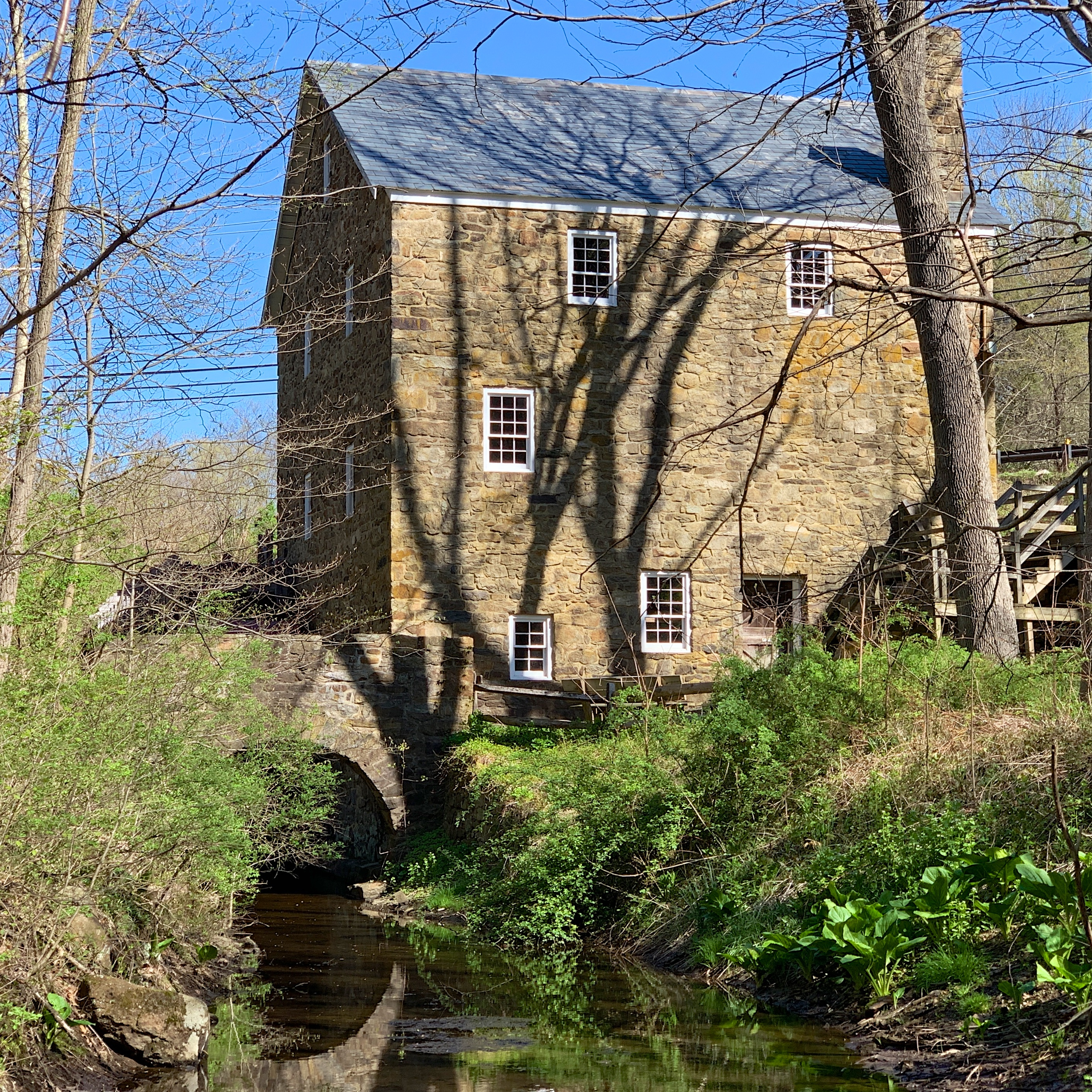
View along the mill race

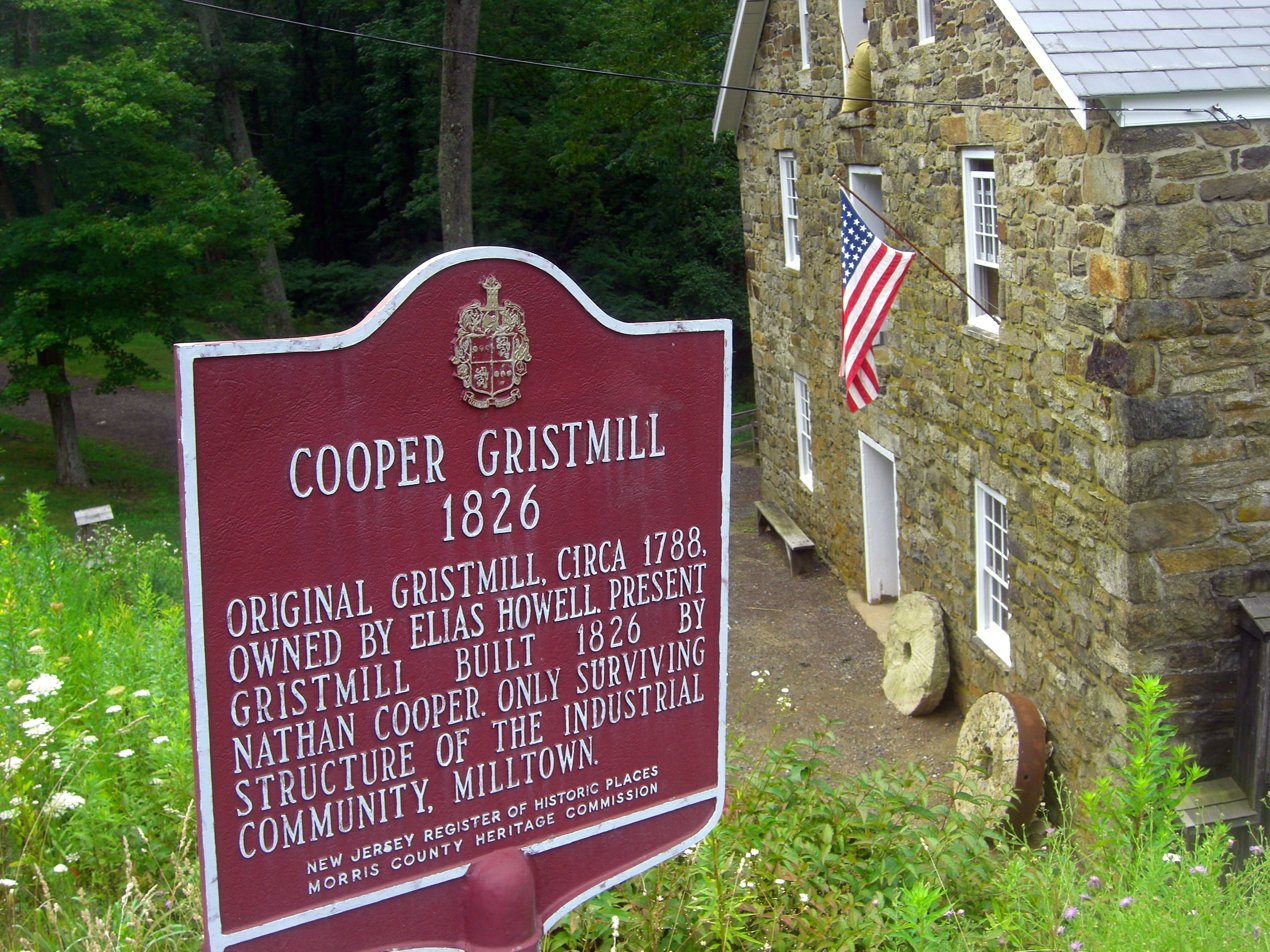
Morris County historical information

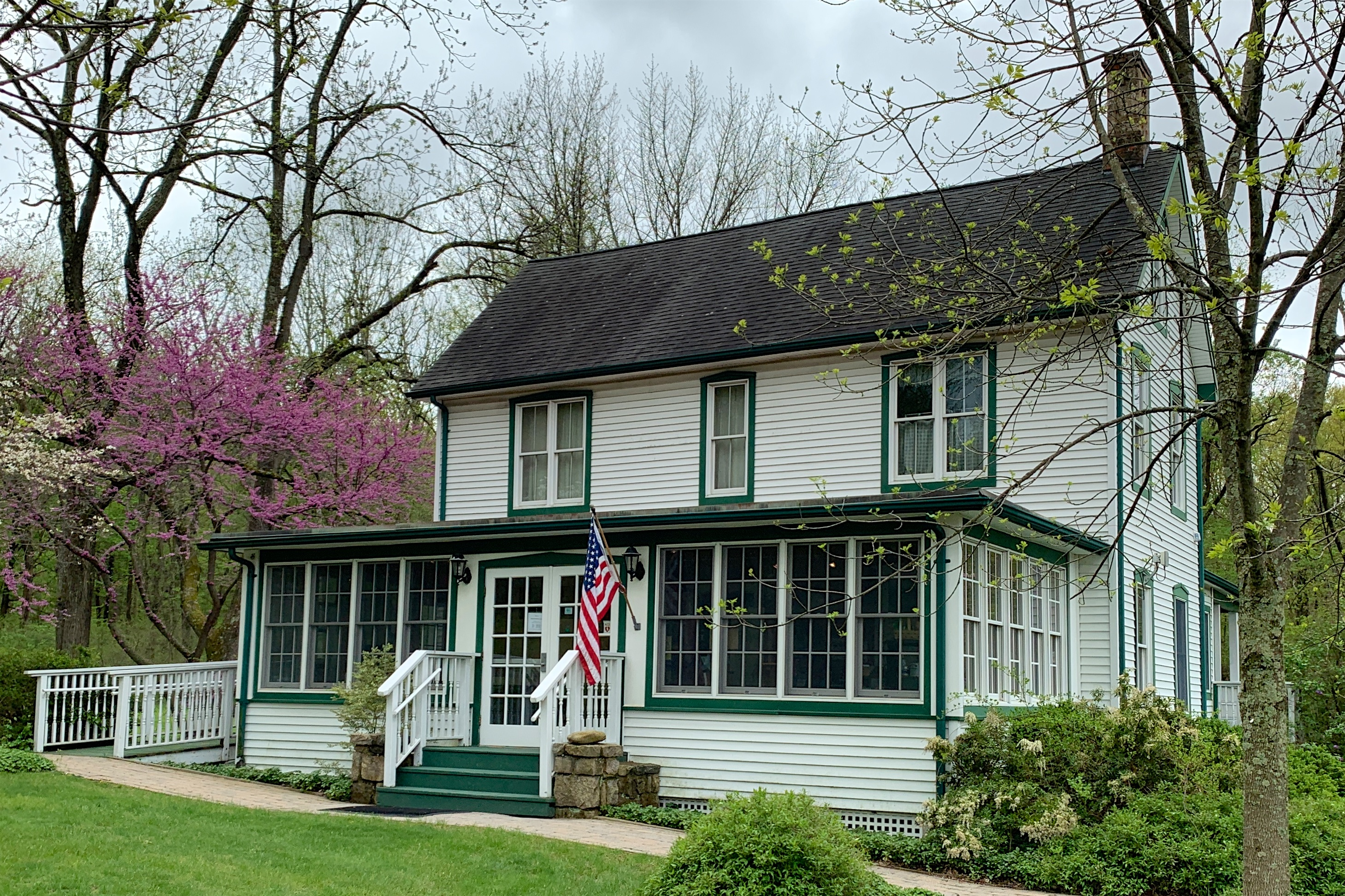
Visitors' center

== See also ==
- National Register of Historic Places listings in Morris County, New Jersey
- General Nathan Cooper Mansion
