= Chester House Inn =

- U.S. National Register of Historic Places
- New Jersey Register of Historic Places
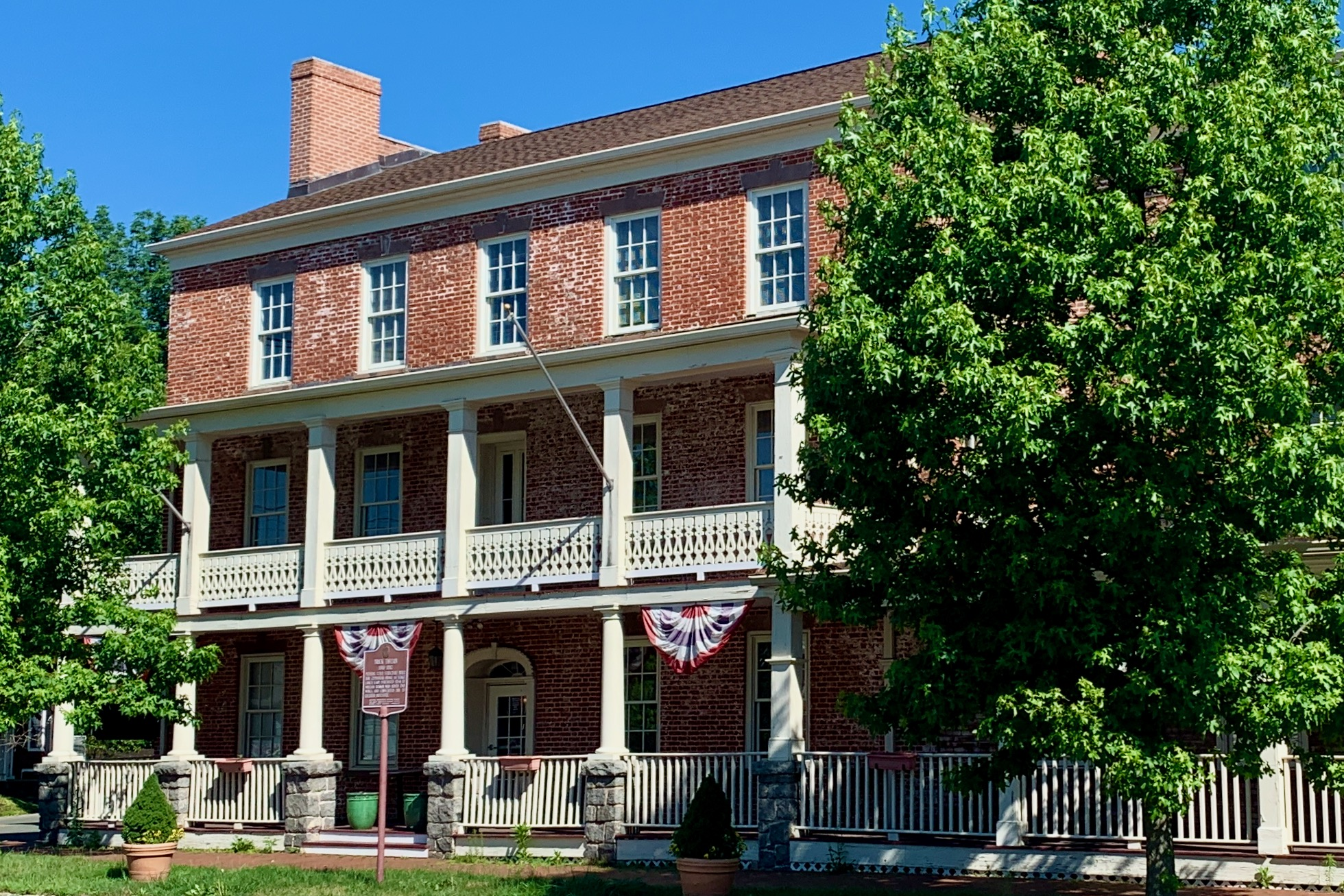
- Chester House Inn in 2020

- Location within Morris County, New Jersey Location within New Jersey Location within the United States
- Location: Main Street and Hillside Road, Chester Borough, New Jersey
- Coordinates: 40°47′10″N 74°41′41.5″W
- Area: 2 acres (0.81 ha)
- Built: 1812
- Built by: Zephaniah Drake
- Architectural style: Federal
- NRHP reference No.: 74001183
- NJRHP No.: 2099

Significant dates
- Added to NRHP: July 18, 1974
- Designated NJRHP: November 26, 1973

The Chester House Inn, also known as the Chester House Hotel, the Chester Inn, the Brick Tavern, and the Publick House, is a historic building at the corner of Main Street and Hillside Road in Chester Borough, Morris County, New Jersey. It was built from 1810 to 1812 by Zephaniah Drake. Known as the Chester House Hotel, it was documented by the Historic American Buildings Survey (HABS) in 1937. The inn was added to the National Register of Historic Places for its significance in architecture, commerce, and education on July 18, 1974.

== History and description ==
The building is a three and one-half story brick building featuring Federal architecture and Flemish bond brickwork. It was built from 1810 to 1812 by Zephaniah Drake to accommodate stagecoach travelers. He sold it to Isaiah Fairclo in 1821, who soon resold it to another Drake. In 1854, William Rankin, a teacher, purchased the Chester Inn and transformed it into a classical college preparatory school, the Chester Institute. In 1862, he sold the building to the Budds.

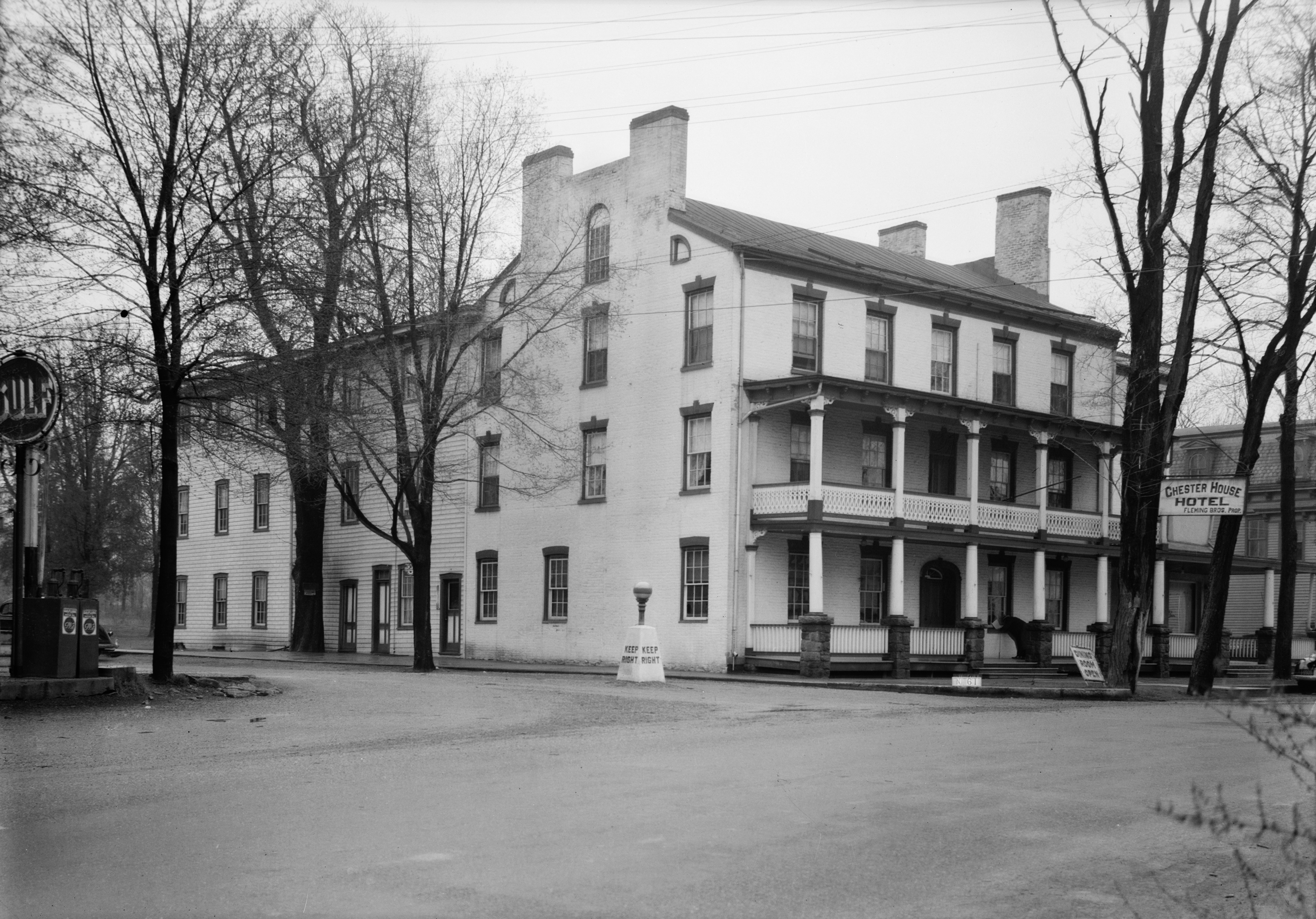
HABS photo from 1937

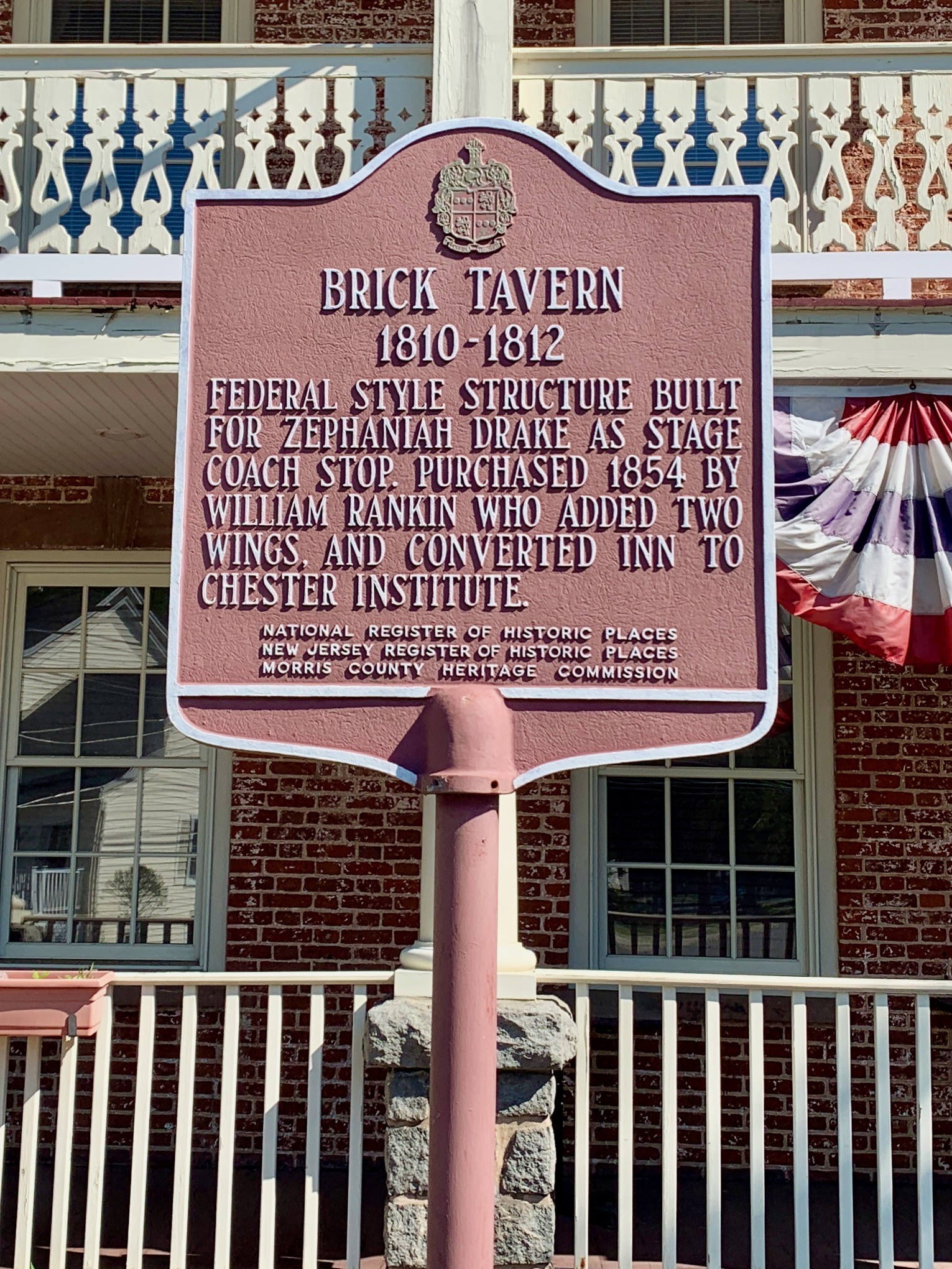
Historic information sign

People wait for a stagecoach in front of the Chester House (left), 1880s

== See also ==
- National Register of Historic Places listings in Morris County, New Jersey
