= Sleepy Hollow, New York =

- Village
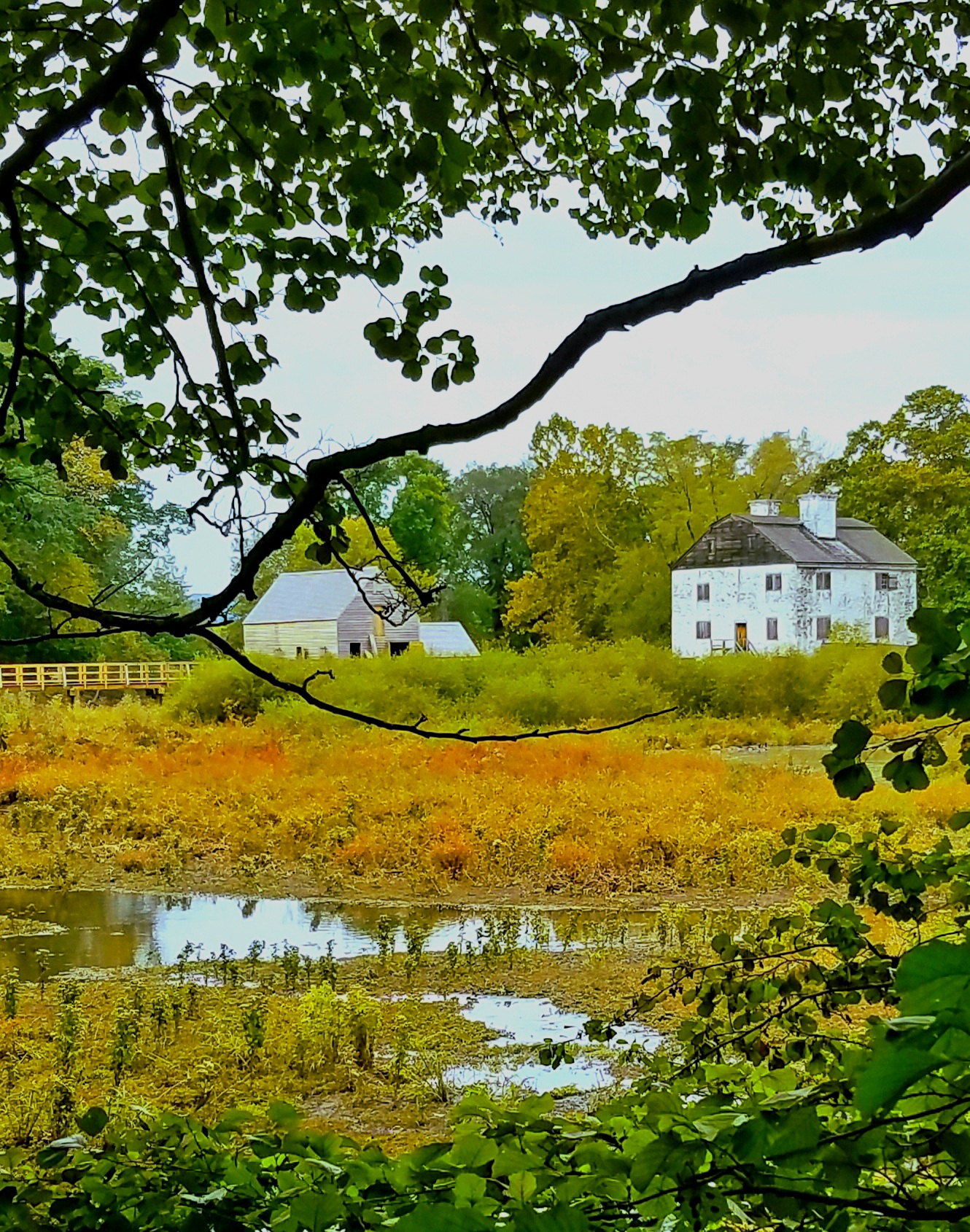
- Philipsburg Manor House in the central part of Sleepy Hollow

- Seal

- Location of Sleepy Hollow, New York
- Coordinates: 41°5′31″N 73°51′52″W
- Country: United States
- State: New York
- County: Westchester
- Town: Mount Pleasant

Area
  - Total: 5.20 sq mi (13.48 km^{2})
  - Land: 2.24 sq mi (5.81 km^{2})
  - Water: 2.96 sq mi (7.67 km^{2})
- Elevation: 89 ft (27 m)

Population (2020)
  - Total: 9,986
  - Density: 4,451.8/sq mi (1,718.85/km^{2})
- Time zone: UTC-5 (Eastern (EST))
  - Summer (DST): UTC-4 (EDT)
- ZIP Code: 10591
- Area code: 914
- FIPS code: 36-67638
- GNIS feature ID: 0958934
- Website: www.sleepyhollowny.gov

Sleepy Hollow is a village in the town of Mount Pleasant in Westchester County, New York, United States, in the New York metropolitan area.

The village is located on the east bank of the Hudson River, approximately 28 miles (45 km) north of Midtown Manhattan in New York City, and is served by the Philipse Manor stop on the Metro-North Hudson Line. To the south of Sleepy Hollow is the village of Tarrytown, and to the north and east are unincorporated parts of Mount Pleasant. The population of the village at the 2020 census was 9,986.

Originally incorporated as North Tarrytown in the late 19th century as a way to draft off Tarrytown's success during the Industrial Revolution, the village adopted its current name in 1996, some three and a half centuries after the first Dutch settlers called the area "Slapershaven" or "Sleepers' Harbor."

The village is known internationally through The Legend of Sleepy Hollow, an 1820 short story by Washington Irving about the local area and its infamous specter, the Headless Horseman. Irving lived in the area and is buried in Sleepy Hollow Cemetery, where numerous other notable people are buried, while real-life inspirations for his characters are interred in the adjacent Old Dutch Burying Ground.

Owing to The Legend, as well as the village's roots in early American history and folklore, Sleepy Hollow is considered by some to be one of the "most haunted places in the world". Despite this designation, Sleepy Hollow has also been called "one of the safest places to live in the United States". Today, the village "thrives as a symbol of Americana, drawing tens of thousands each fall to its haunted hayrides, lantern-lit cemetery tours, pumpkin festivals, and theatrical reimaginings of Irving’s famous tale."

== History ==
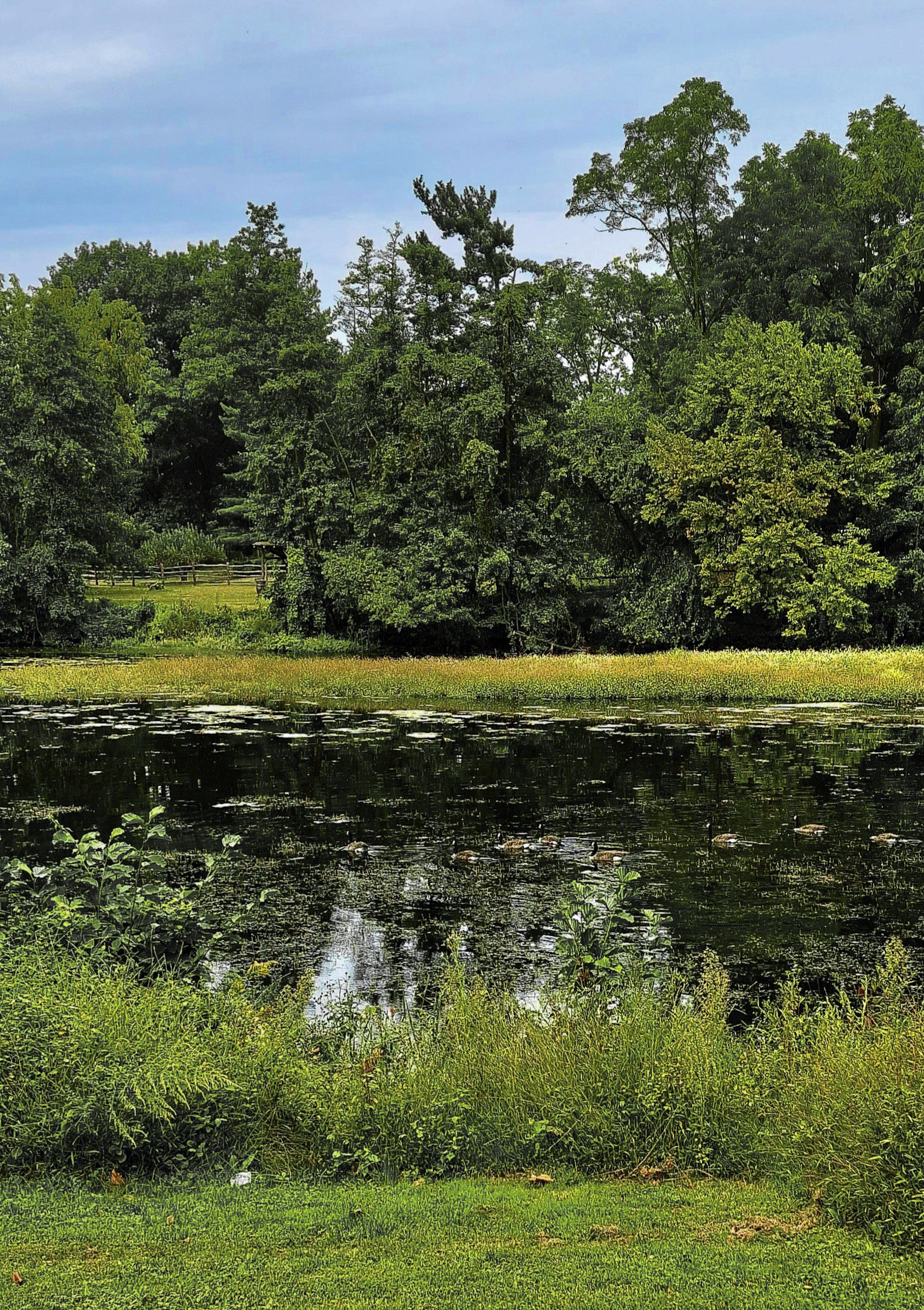
Lower course of Pocantico River near Philipsburg Manor House – part of the area which the early Dutch colonists named "Slapershaven," or "Sleepers' Haven." The name was later Anglicized as “Sleepy Hollow.”

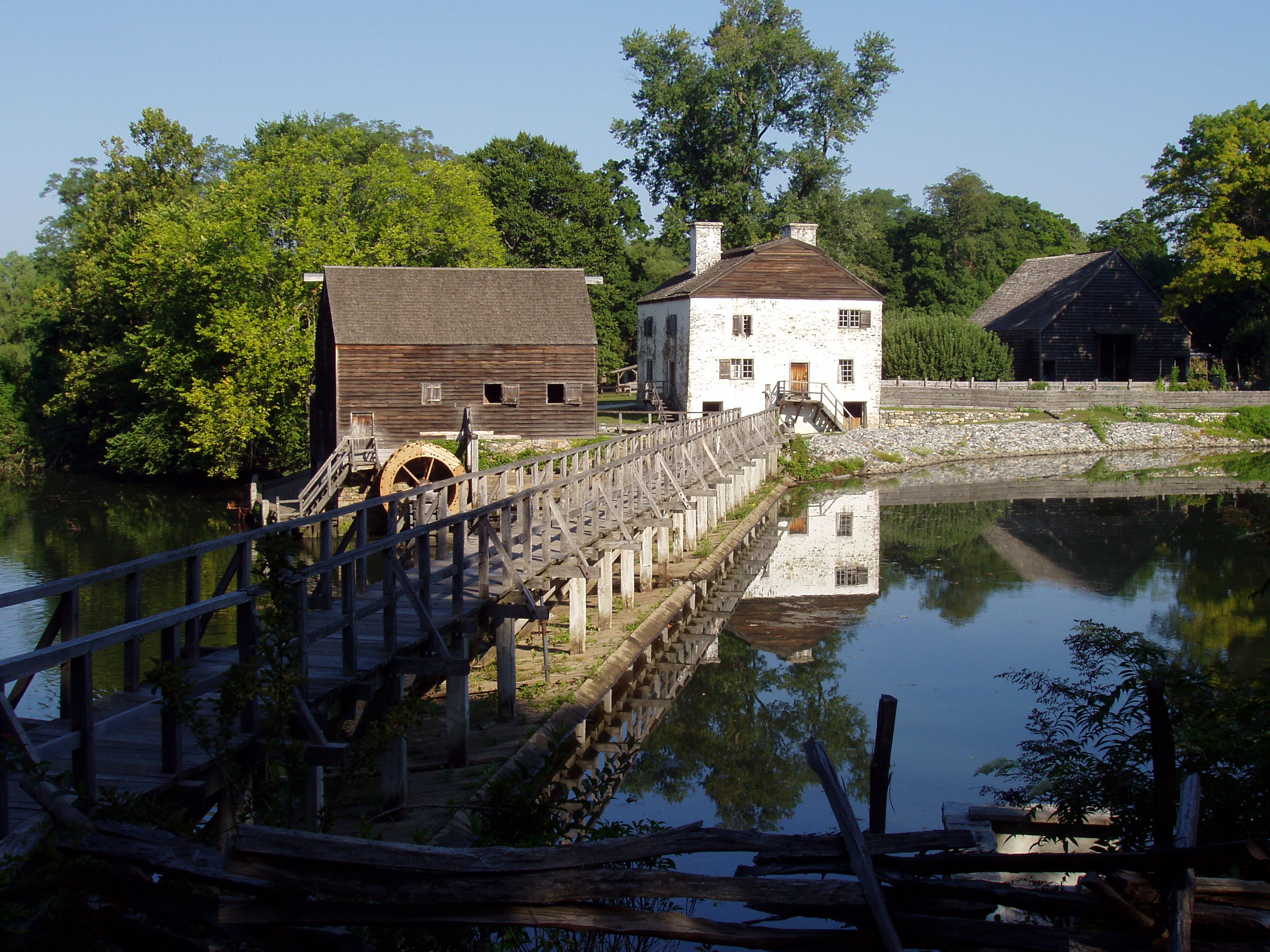
Philipsburg Manor House at the Upper Mills

The two square miles of land that would become Sleepy Hollow belonged to the larger domain of the Wecquaesgeek, a Munsee-speaking band of Wappinger people. Their fort and burying ground may have been located on the hillside where the Old Dutch Church of Sleepy Hollow was to be built later. In 1609, Henry Hudson claimed the Hudson Valley, including the Tappan Zee area, for the Netherlands. There was relative peace between the Native Americans and the Dutch until the mid-17th century, and the Dutch West India Company had been providing its investors with large land grants called patroonships to encourage settlement of the New Netherland colony on lands bought from local Native American tribes along the East Coast of what is now the United States.

=== The Upper Mills ===
Much of the land that would become Philipsburg Manor had previously belonged to Adriaen van der Donck, who had invested in such a patroonship before the English conquest of New Netherland in 1664. In 1672, merchants Frederick Philipse (or Vredryk Flypse), Thomas Delavall, and Thomas Lewis purchased from his widow's brother the first tracts of land in current-day northern Yonkers. Philipse made several additional purchases between 1680 and 1686 from the Wecquaesgeek and Sintsink tribes, expanding the property to both the north and south. Philipse also bought out his partners' stakes during this time, enticing friends from New Amsterdam and Long Island to move with him with the promise of free land and limited taxes. The manor grew to around 52,000 acres (21,000 ha) or about 81 sq mi (210 km^{2}), comprising much of today's lower Westchester County. Philipse was granted a royal charter in 1693, creating the Manor of Philipsburg and establishing him as first lord of the manor.

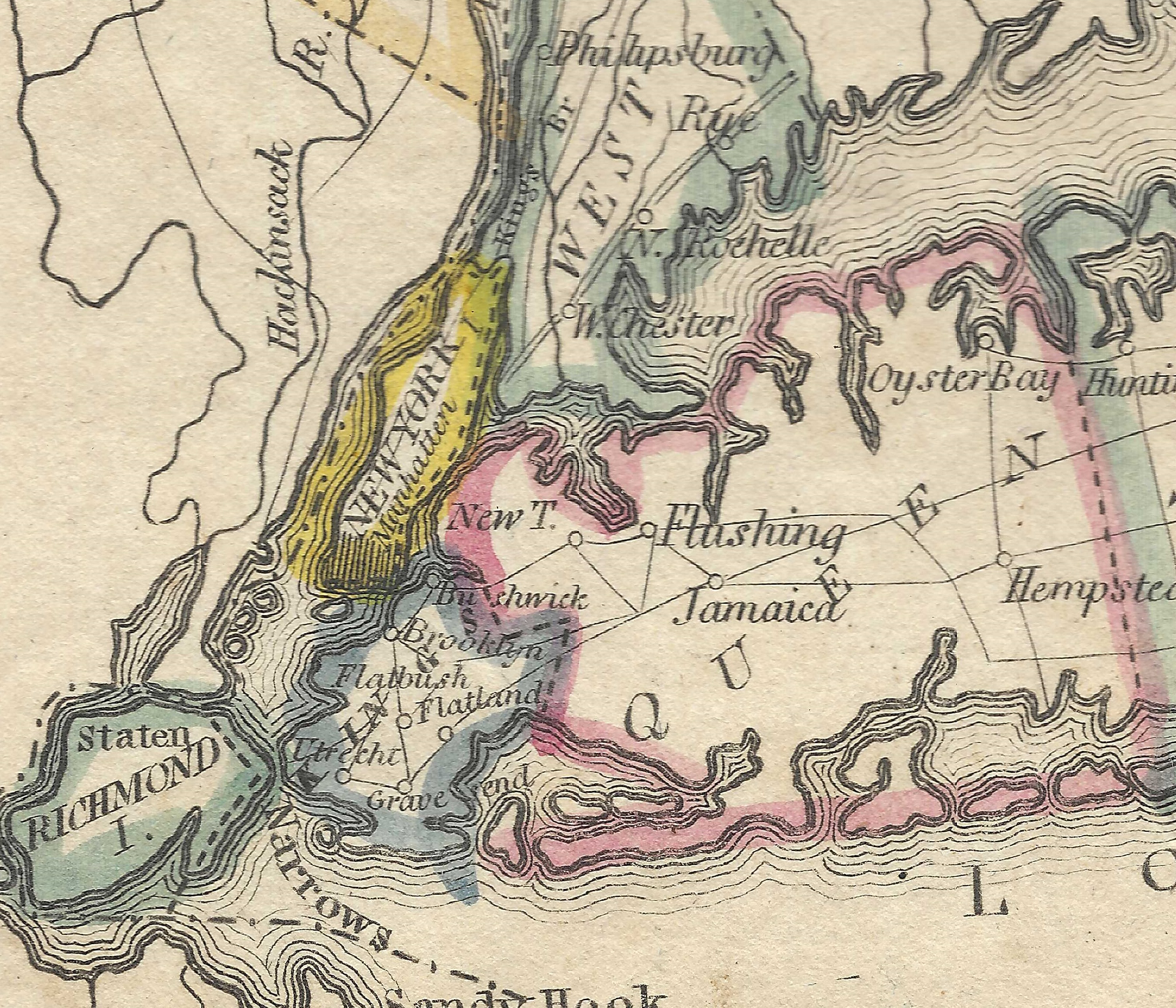
Settlement, which would become the village of Sleepy Hollow, appears on this 1814 map as Philipsburg.

Philipse founded his country seat at the mouth of the Pocantico River, in the northern part of his manor, which would be called the Upper Mills. A small Dutch community had already been established there when he arrived in 1683. He built a gristmill (Note: According to the village historian Henry Steiner, it has been suggested there may have been an even earlier mill and pond on this site. (Steiner, Henry (1998) The Place Names of Historic Sleepy Hollow & Tarrytown. Heritage Books, p. 84)) and shipping depot, today part of the Philipse Manor House historic site. A pious man (and a carpenter by trade), he was architect and financier of the settlement's stone church, known today as the Old Dutch Church of Sleepy Hollow, and was said to have built the pulpit with his own hands. The church served successive lords and ladies of the manor and their tenant farmers (who were largely Dutch, French Huguenot, Swiss, and German immigrants (Note: Tenant farmers' houses had been on their small plots spread across the massive estate. They paid their rent in part by the grain they produced and were bound to bring all their grain to the Upper Mills gristmill for grinding.)) until the outbreak of the American Revolutionary War.

When Philipse died in 1702, the manor was divided between his son, Adolphus Philipse, and his grandson, Frederick Philipse II. Adolphus received the Upper Mills property, which extended from Dobbs Ferry to the Croton River. Frederick II was given the Lower Mills at the confluence of the Saw Mill and Hudson Rivers. Adolphus transformed the Upper Mills into a major commercial operation and managed it for nearly 50 years. The complex then included a stone gristmill, a bakehouse, workshops for blacksmiths, carpenters, and coopers, and a wharf for exporting grain and cornmeal internationally and for importing foreign goods. It was surrounded by fields of grain, orchards, stands of timber, and stone quarries. The complex was largely operated by enslaved Africans. Slave quarters were installed by Adolphus about 90 feet from the main house. By the time of his death, twenty-three enslaved men, women, and children lived and worked at the manor. They are catalogued by name (and children, also with ages) in the 1750 probate inventory of his properties. As the most valuable "chattel" (personal property), they are listed first - before cattle, furniture, and tools.

Adolphus's nephew, Frederick Philipse III, became the third lord of the manor upon his uncle's death. He did not live at the modest Upper Mills house, choosing the manor house at the Lower Mills (now Philipse Manor Hall State Historic Site) as his primary country estate and developing it into a grand Georgian-style mansion suitable for a man of his status. (Note: In the late 18th century, the Lower Mills area was often referred to as "Philipse's.") The Upper Mills main house, gristmill, surrounding buildings, ponds, fields, woods, and a wharf on the Hudson River (that is, everything related to the large-scale production and sale of flour, dairy products, timber, and other goods) were leased by Philipse to members of prominent local landowning families, first Josiah Martling (Note: The Martlings were early Dutch settlers and influential members of the area community. One of the Martling family members, blacksmith Abraham Martling, is believed to be the historical inspiration for the character Brom Bones in The Legend of Sleepy Hollow. His grave in the Old Dutch Burying Ground is located just several feet away from that of Catriena Ecker Van Tassel, whose name Irving borrowed for Katrina Van Tassel. Names of several Martling family members are engraved on the Revolutionary Soldiers' Monument in the adjacent Sleepy Hollow Cemetery.) (from 1752 to 1761) and then William Pugsley (Note: William Pugsley came from a large Westchester Quaker family associated with, among other things, Pugsley Park in Peekskill, Pugsley House in Ossining, Pugsley Hollow inNew Rochelle, and Pugsley Avenue in The Bronx. He died in 1786, shortly after he sold his lease to Beekman, and is buried in the Old Dutch Burying Ground. Many of his relatives were Loyalists, who joined the "Loyalist exodus" to Canada after the British defeat in the American Revolution. There, they and other refugees from New England and New York founded the community of Philipsburg, Quebec. Premier of Canada’s province of New Brunswick, William Pugsley, was a descendant of theirs.) (from 1761 till after the American Revolutionary War). It is the area of this leaseholding that would become the core of the present-day village of Sleepy Hollow.

During the American Revolutionary War, the Upper Mills area was situated within the Neutral Ground, an unprotected buffer zone between British-controlled territory to the south and American lines to the north. Numerous local histories and scholarly articles document the hardships faced by residents in the neutral ground, who were subjected to devastating raids from both sides. Their level of desperation is well illustrated by the oft-quoted description, “They feared everybody whom they saw.” Knowing the terrain well, many local residents served as crucial scouts, guides, and foragers for the Continental Army in the infamous neutral ground. The Old Dutch Burying Ground, the area's oldest cemetery, holds one of the highest concentrations of Revolutionary War veteran graves in the state of New York.

In the late 1790s, Washington Irving visited the Sleepy Hollow area with his local friend James K. Paulding, a Revolutionary War militiaman who in 1780 had helped capture British Major John André in what is now known as Patriot's Park and thereby foiled the plans of Benedict Arnold. Together they explored the area, hunting, fishing and talking with the local folk. The visits of Irving—and the local folklore and ghost tales he heard while there—were immortalized in the enduringly popular story The Legend of Sleepy Hollow.

Writer Washington Irving's account of Sleepy Hollow gave much of the town its reputation. Irving spent a considerable amount of time in Sleepy Hollow during his teenage years to escape the yellow fever epidemic in Manhattan. In doing so, he developed an understanding of the area and an admiration for it. By describing it as "one of the quietest places in the whole world" and frequently describing its atmosphere in his short story The Legend of Sleepy Hollow, Washington Irving described to readers his depiction of the town. Irving also incorporated iterations of the tales and legends he heard during his time in Sleepy Hollow into The Legend of Sleepy Hollow, resulting in the characters of Diedrich Knickerbocker and The Headless Horseman serving as Sleepy Hollow's hallmark. The Legend of Sleepy Hollow enthusiasts frequently visit Sleepy Hollow during the Halloween season to this day.

=== Town ===
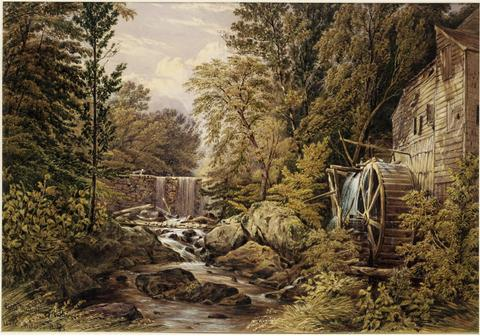
Carl's Mill on the Pocantico River, Sleepy Hollow by William Rickarby Miller (1851), depicting one of the early landmarks of the Sleepy Hollow area; it vanished before 1893. In Wolfert's Roost, Washington Irving writes: "In a remote part of the Hollow, where the Pocantico forced its way down rugged rocks, stood Carl's mill, the haunted house of the neighborhood."

In 1779, Frederick Philipse III, the last lord of Philipsburg Manor and a staunch Loyalist, was attainted for treason by New York's revolutionary government. Philipsburg Manor was confiscated, split into about 300 lots, and then sold at public auction. Most of the buyers were Philipse’s tenant farmers who used the opportunity to buy the small plots they worked. A much larger Upper Mills property, about 750 acres (300 ha), was purchased by the New York merchant Gerard (Gerardus) Garret Beekman Jr.

There were no more enslaved people on the land — in 1786, the state of New York passed a law emancipating all enslaved people whose masters’ property had been confiscated; the law predated all other emancipation-related landmark events in the United States. Beekman used the property as farmland; his tenant farmers were veterans of the American Revolutionary War, as was Beekman himself. Ironically, the first American ancestors of both Frederick III, a Loyalist, and Gerard Beekman, a Patriot who acquired his confiscated land, reportedly arrived in the New World on the same ship.

Beekman later expanded his property to nearly 900 acres. He died in 1822, and his widow, Cornelia, laid out the central portion of the estate into streets and sold building lots. The development eventually became known as Beekman Town (also spelled Beekmantown), with Beekman Street, soon to be upgraded to Beekman Avenue, as its main street. The street follows the route of the old “road to landing;” the latter was an important local shipyard, “where many vessels were built... with timber cut in the dense forests of the Mill Woods.” (Note: Its location is now a small waterfront park, Horan's Landing, near the Hudson River viewing platform.)

Cornelia was a well-known figure among the Westchester Patriots and the daughter of Pierre Van Cortlandt, the first lieutenant governor of New York. She named one of the streets "Cortlandt" and another "Clinton," after George Clinton, the first governor of New York and later vice president of the United States. (Note: Clinton's daughter, Maria, married Beekman's son, Stephen (who spelled his last name as Beeckman). He inherited the inland hilltop portion of the family estate and became a founding resident of Pocantico Hills, New York. In the mid-19th century, Pocantico Hills was known as Beeckmantown, after Dr. Stephen D. Beeckman. Another street in downtown Sleepy Hollow is named DePeyster Street. Cornelia named it after the prominent De Peyster family, which the Beekmans' daughter Ann married into. Their son-in-law, Frederick De Peyster, was a Loyalist who fled to Canada after the Revolution but later returned to New York and reestablished himself as a successful businessman. Historians often cite the De Peyster family as a primary example of "Loyalists becoming Loyal Citizens." See: McKito, Valerie H. (August 10, 2015). From Loyalists to Loyal Citizens: The DePeyster Family of New York. SUNY Press. pp. 75–76. ISBN 978-1-4384-5812-0.) She donated a plot at the top of Beekman Street, a triangular island where the flagpole and the village clock stand today, for "the public use forever." By 1839, all the lots had been sold and released to the town of Mount Pleasant. In the 1860s, the undeveloped waterfront tract of Beekman's property was bought by Ambrose Kingsland in addition to his 1850s estate further south.

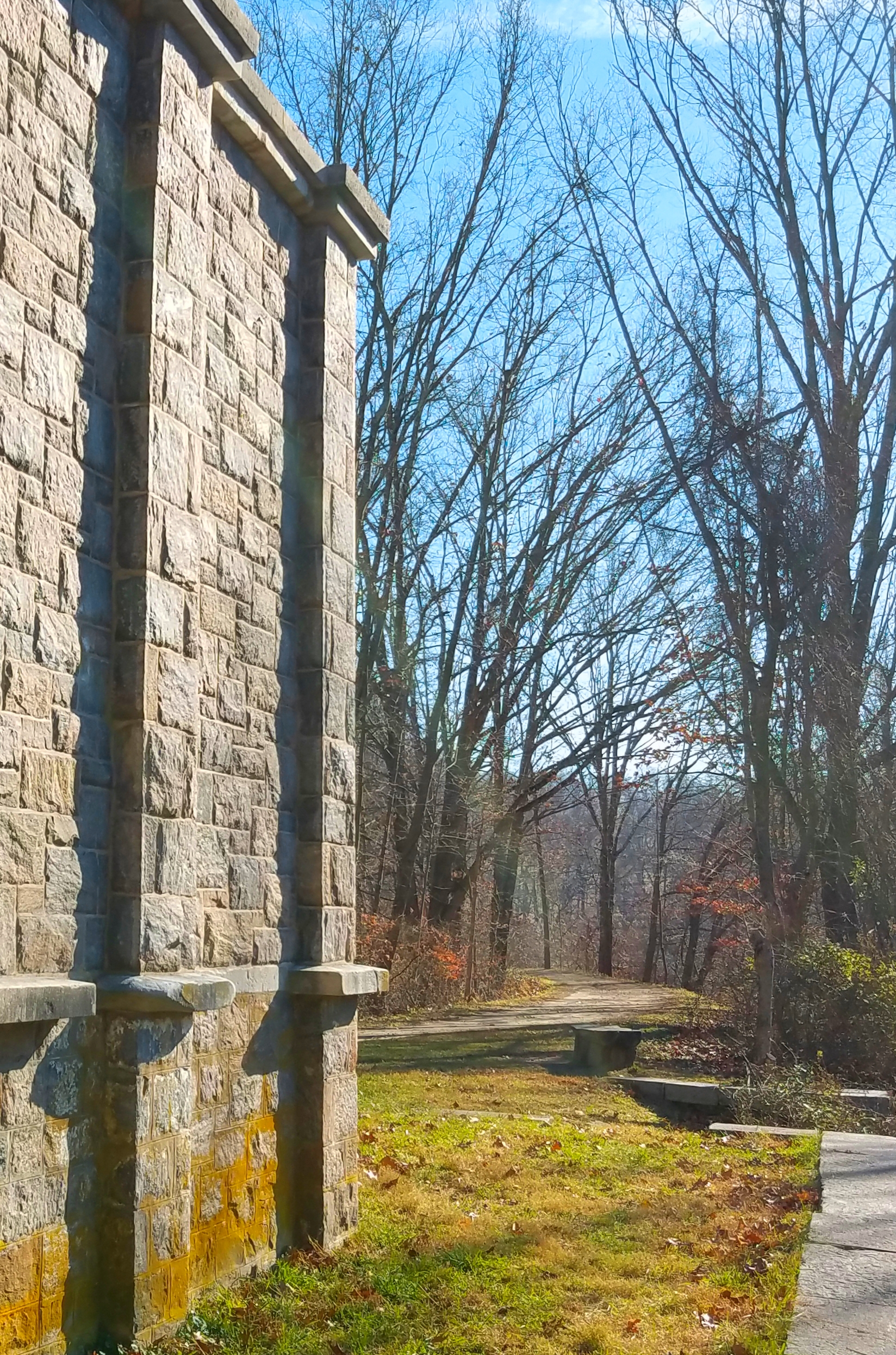
Croton Aqueduct weir near Sleepy Hollow Cemetery

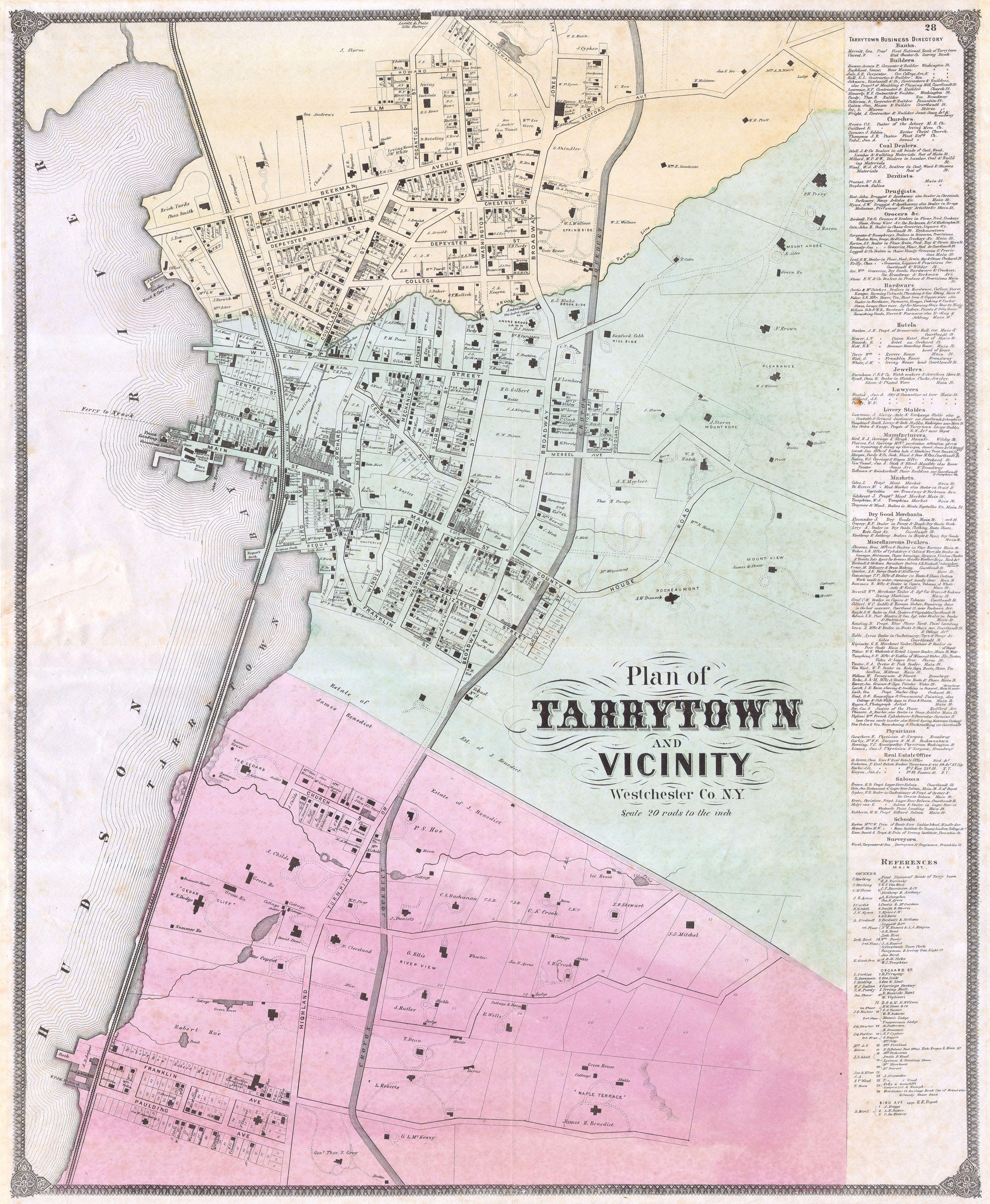
Detailed 1868 map of Tarrytown and Beekman Town from Frederick W. Beers's Atlas of New York and Vicinity

Meanwhile, Beekman Town's closest neighbor, Tarrytown, was developing as a trading center on the Albany Post Road and a commercial port on the Hudson River. The Industrial Revolution brought to it a railway station on the Hudson River Railroad, industrial mills, banks, and throngs of new people. Eventually, the industrial boom started spilling over into Beekman Town. Constructed between 1837 and 1842, the first Croton Aqueduct, New York City’s original water supply system, passed through Beekman Town as part of its route to the city. It was built primarily by Irish immigrants (as was the Hudson River Railroad), many of whom settled in the village. Washington Irving wrote to his friends that aqueduct builders claimed that on their walks back from taverns in the night, they saw headless apparitions around Sleepy Hollow.

Before and during the U.S. Civil War, the Underground Railroad ran through the neighboring Tarrytown. Tarrytown's famous Foster Memorial AME Zion Church served as a vital Underground Railroad stop. Known as the “Freedom Church," it provided food and shelter to escaped slaves en route to Canada. Company H of the 32nd New York Infantry Regiment that served in the Union Army during the Civil War was composed exclusively of volunteers from the Tarrytown area, including Beekmantown. They fought in the First Battle of Bull Run, the Peninsular Campaign, and the Battles of South Mountain, Antietam, and Chancellorsville; and their letters home were often published in local newspapers. Many of them are buried in the Sleepy Hollow Cemetery, where the Civil War Soldiers Monument was erected in 1890 in their honor. Its granite base is topped by a 7-foot-6-inch bronze statue of a Union infantry soldier standing at "parade rest"; bronze plaques on the base list some 240 names.

=== North Tarrytown ===
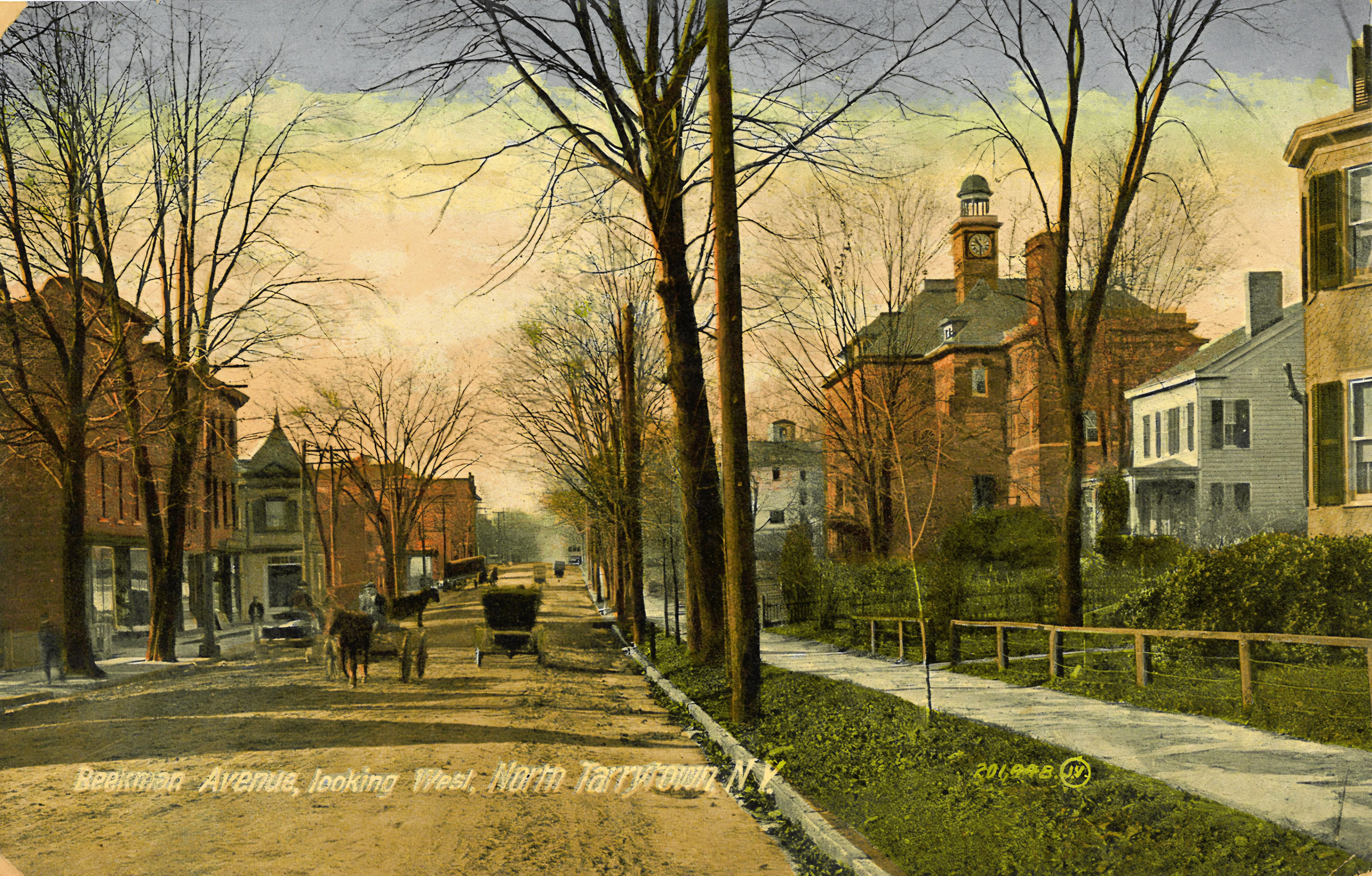
1910 postcard depicting Beekman Avenue

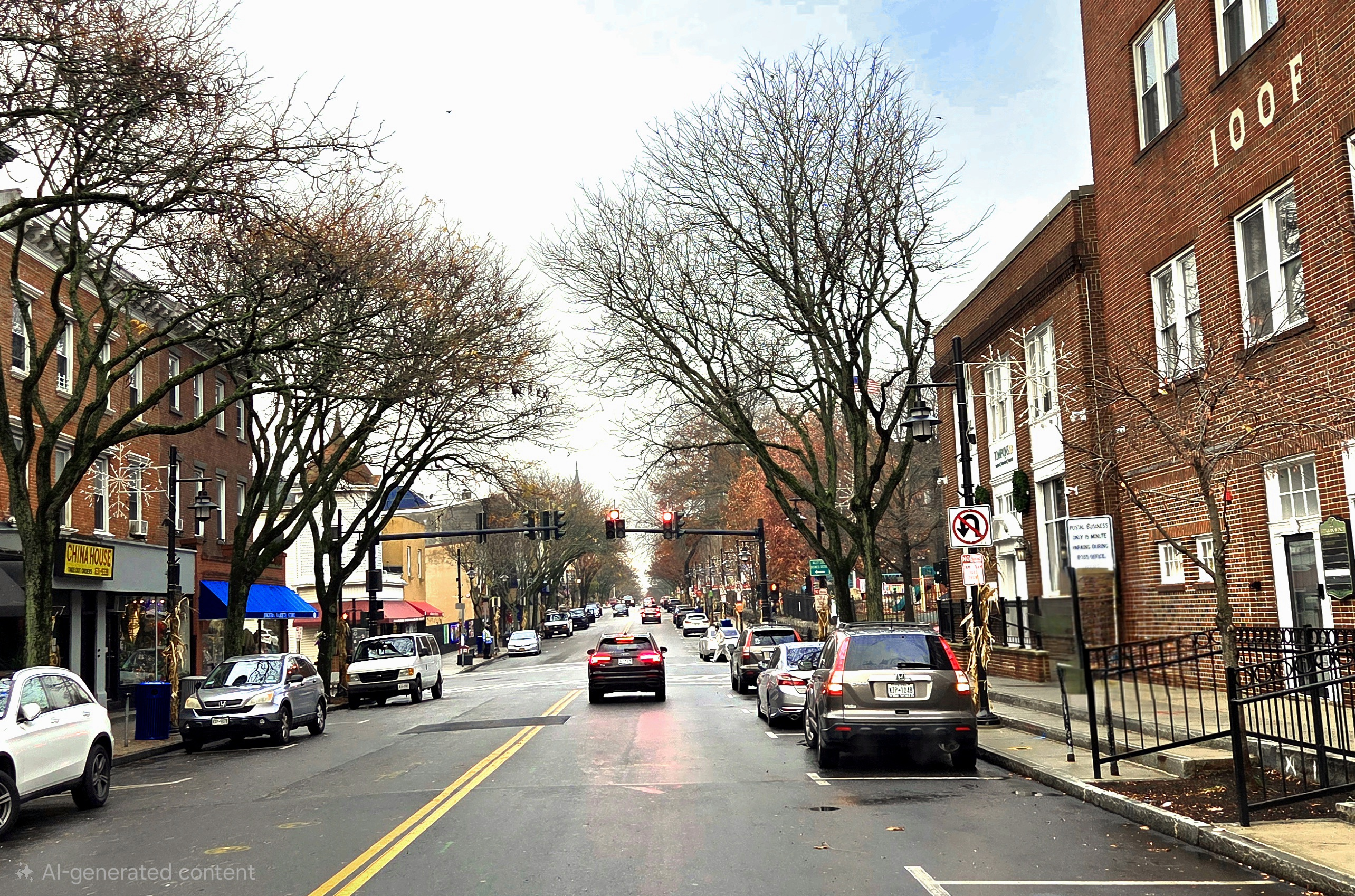
2025 view from the same location. Most houses on Beekman Avenue, built during the industrial boom of the late 1800s-early 1900s, have survived urban renewal of the 1960s-1970s, when other parts of the village’s business district were rebuilt.

Beekman Town's post office opened in 1871. In 1874, the village incorporated as North Tarrytown, using the recognizable name of its commercially successful neighbor to the south. (Note: This naming proved to be confusing, as it would often cause errors in books, articles, and even on picture postcards, with writers and publishers mistakenly labeling places in North Tarrytown as being in Tarrytown.) Italian, German, and Eastern European immigrants began settling in the Tarrytowns in the late 19th and early 20th centuries to open stores and shops and join the industrial workforce.

North Tarrytown began its association with the automobile industry in 1899, when "Renaissance man" John Brisben Walker (who at the time owned The Cosmopolitan magazine and lived in nearby Irvington) acquired the Stanley Brothers steam-car patents. He bought part of the former Ambrose Kingsland estate in North Tarrytown and built there a large factory, designed by McKim, Mead & White, to produce steam-powered "Mobiles." In 1900, his Mobile Company of America went into operation at the foot of Beekman Avenue. When the first Mobile was completed, approximately 180 men worked in the new factory.

Walker began subdividing the northern part of his North Tarrytown property, attempting to capitalize on the site's location along the Hudson River Railroad. One of his selling points for this residential development, called Philipse Manor in a confused reference to nearby Philipsburg Manor House, (Note: The actual Philipse Manor house is in Yonkers, some ten miles (16 km) to the south (both manor houses served the original Philipsburg Manor).) was the rail access, but this failed to materialize, and Walker's Philipse Manor Land Company floundered. The Mobile Company of America also failed: steam-powered carriages proved to be inferior to gasoline internal combustion vehicles. The heavily indebted Walker had to sell his North Tarrytown properties to William Abraham Bell, who had invested in Walker’s automobile venture. Bell, with his extensive experience in railroad development, not only continued the residential construction at Philipse Manor but also made the rail service possible by building the station and presenting it to the railroad. Wealthy New Yorkers started eagerly buying homes in the Philipse Manor neighborhood.

A second residential neighborhood, Sleepy Hollow Manor, was developed in the vicinity of the station in the 1920s, on the former estate of renowned explorer and politician John C. Frémont. Today, the two neighborhoods form the northern part of the village. The Philipse Manor station is on the National Register of Historic Places. A parcel of the former Ambrose Kingsland estate where Kingsland's opulent mansion once stood was acquired by New York's Westchester County in 1924 and converted into a public park. It opened in 1926 and was named Kingsland Point Park.

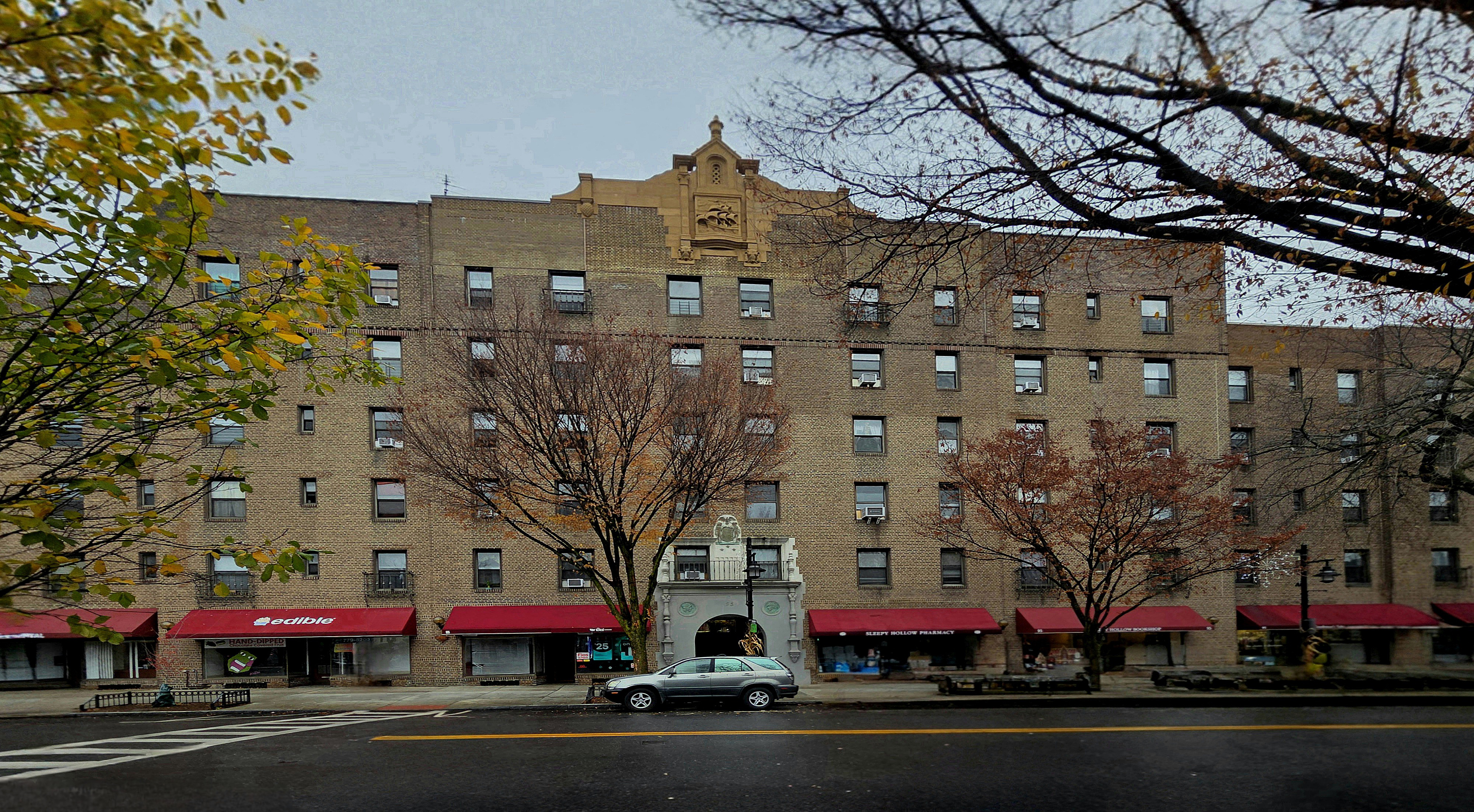
Van Tassel Apartments in 2025

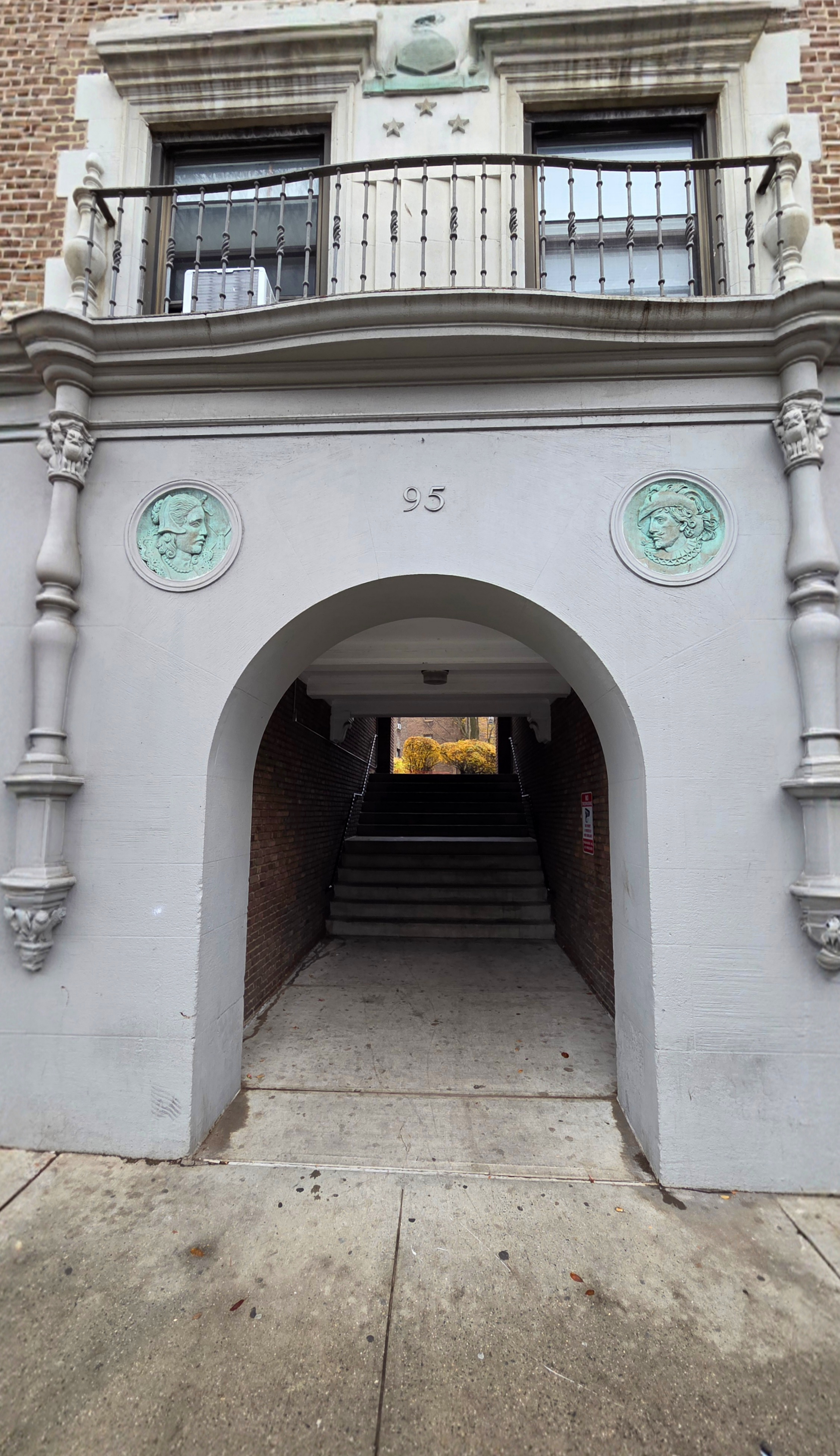
Bas-relief medallions at the entrance of Van Tassel Apartments, featuring Henry Hudson and Katrina Van Tassel

In 1903, the closed automobile plant at the foot of Beekman Avenue was leased (and subsequently sold) to Maxwell-Briscoe, manufacturer of gasoline internal combustion automobiles. Destroyed in a fire in 1907, it was rebuilt and acquired by Chevrolet in 1914-1915. In 1918, Chevrolet was integrated into General Motors, and the plant became the GM North Tarrytown Assembly facility.

To alleviate housing shortage for workers of the expanding plant, John D. Rockefeller Jr. (whose estate was two miles from North Tarrytown) conceived and financed the construction of a large housing cooperative on Beekman Avenue. Completed in 1929, the five-story Van Tassel Apartments complex, arranged around a large courtyard, is a prime example of early garden apartment architecture. Bricks for the building were imported from the Netherlands, and its design embraces the area's Dutch heritage. The main entrance is flanked by bas-relief medallions featuring explorer Henry Hudson and Katrina Van Tassel, the building's literary namesake from The Legend of Sleepy Hollow. Other bas-reliefs on the building depict scenes from Dutch colonial history. (The idea for the building's name and the bas reliefs belonged to Abby Aldrich Rockefeller, Rockefeller's wife.) The building was known for its high-quality construction and luxury (for the time) amenities, such as radio antennas and kitchens with electric refrigerators, gas ranges, and dumbwaiters. To this day, the Van Tassel is still the largest single residential building in Sleepy Hollow by unit count.

By the 1940s, the historic Upper Mills complex with its gristmill and wharf was long gone. Only the main house remained, significantly altered by several generations of the Beekman family and the later owners, including the Broadway star Elsie Janis. In 1940, John D. Rockefeller Jr. purchased the property to preserve and restore it. After several major restorations, the rebuilt site would become the present-day Philipsburg Manor House living-history museum, designated as a National Historic Landmark.

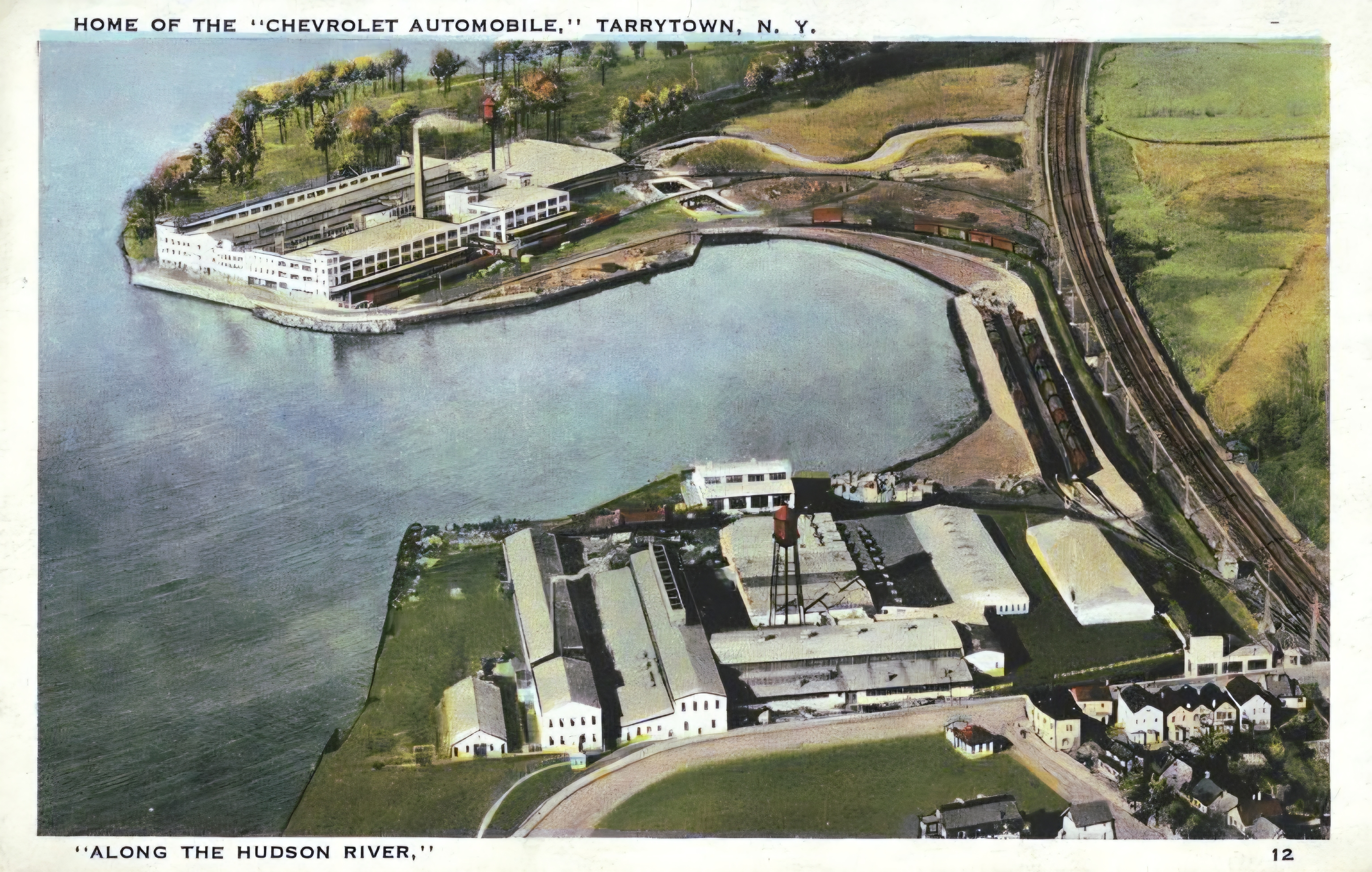
Postcard depicting the two main divisions of the North Tarrytown plant in the 1920s. The lower part of Beekman Avenue is bottom right. The Pocantico Bay (in the center) would be later completely filled in.

By the middle of the 20th century, North Tarrytown was a quintessential factory town. The sprawling GM plant, or “the Shop” as the locals called it, was by far the village's (and the whole region's) largest employer. The GM ranks had swelled with African American workers as well as French Canadian, Polish, and Slovak immigrants, followed by Cubans, Dominicans, Ecuadorians, and others. The plant at its peak employed some 5,000 people. It worked around the clock, running three shifts. Everybody in the village knew the schedule of shift changes, because all roads would be clogged by cars coming to and from the plant. The plant also altered the geography of the village: its 1920s expansions involved rerouting the lower Pocantico River north of the site; and later, the plant completed the filling-in of the Pocantico Bay, a process started in the 1840s to support the construction of the Hudson River Railroad. That is why the Hudson River coastline in Sleepy Hollow looks very different today from how it looked on early maps and photographs. (Note: And that is why the "point" in the name of Kingsland Point Park, which used to be a promontory in Ambrose Kingsland's time, no longer looks like a point.)

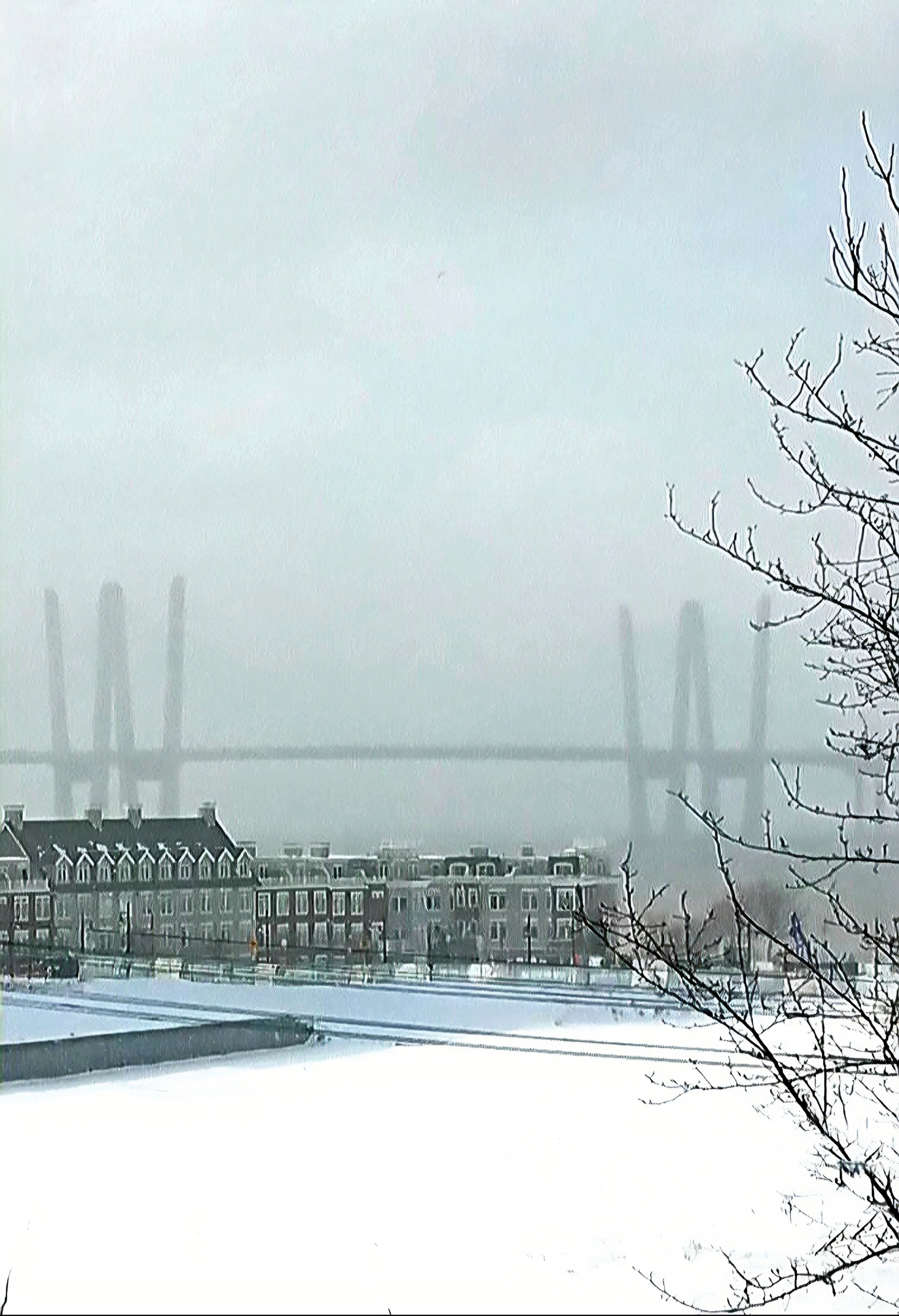
Partially redeveloped site of North Tarrytown Assembly in 2020. In the background: residential community Ichabod's Landing, built in 2006-2007, and Tappan Zee Bridge.

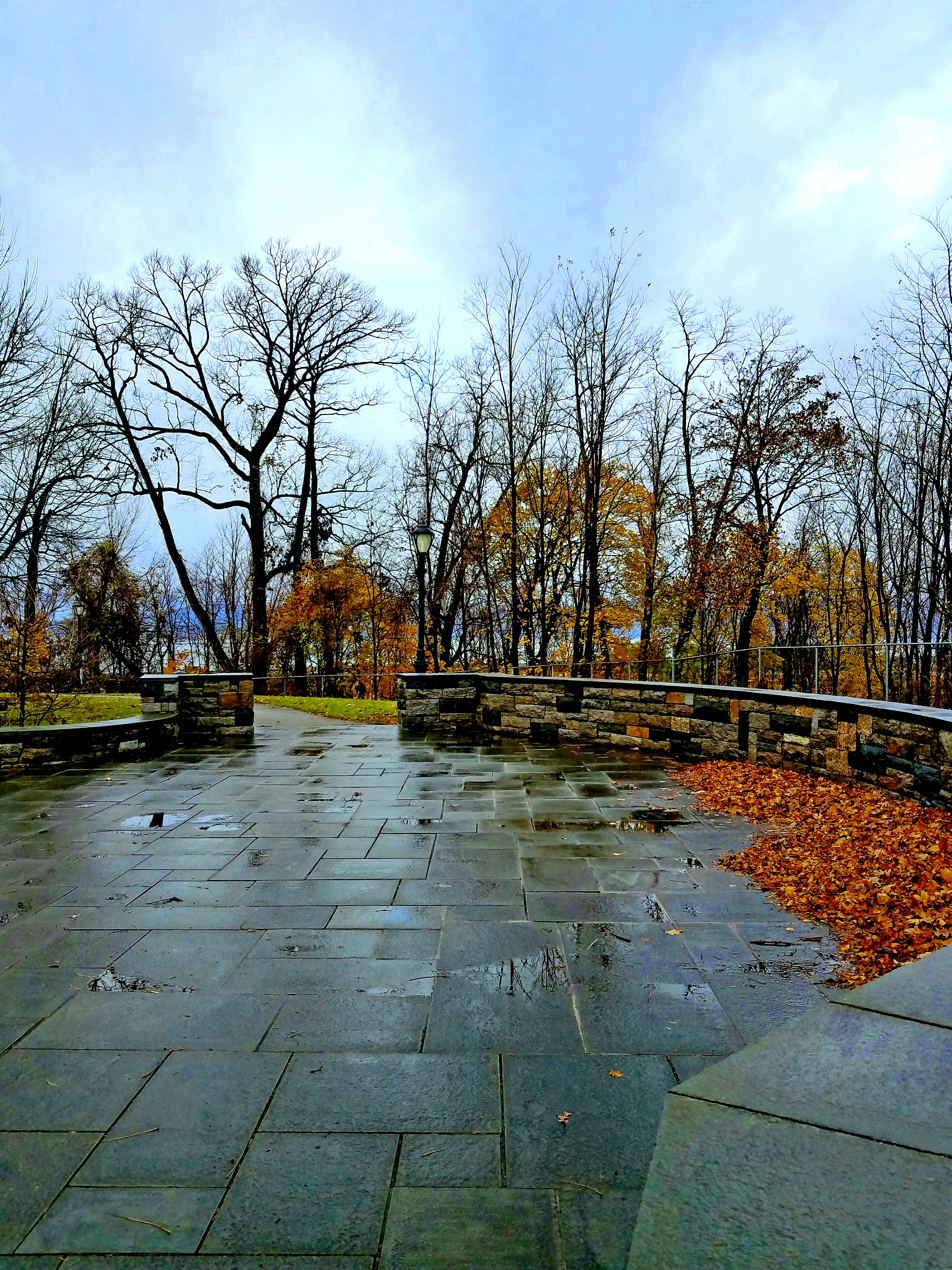
Barnhart Park on Andrews Lane occupies part of the site of a P.R. Mallory and Co. (later, Duracell) battery manufacturing facility, which closed in 1984

The industrial heyday of the Tarrytowns lasted until the 1973–1975 recession in the United States. Manufacturing employment in the Tarrytowns started steadily declining, following a nationwide trend. The Duracell (formerly, P. R. Mallory and Co) battery manufacturing facility on Elm Street closed in 1984. The North Tarrytown Assembly followed in 1996. When the last vehicle rolled off the line at the end of June 1996, it concluded "the run of the longest continuously operating manufacturing facility in the GM family." Within years, manufacturing buildings were demolished. (The heavily polluted sites subsequently underwent a lengthy decontamination.)

=== The Village of Sleepy Hollow ===
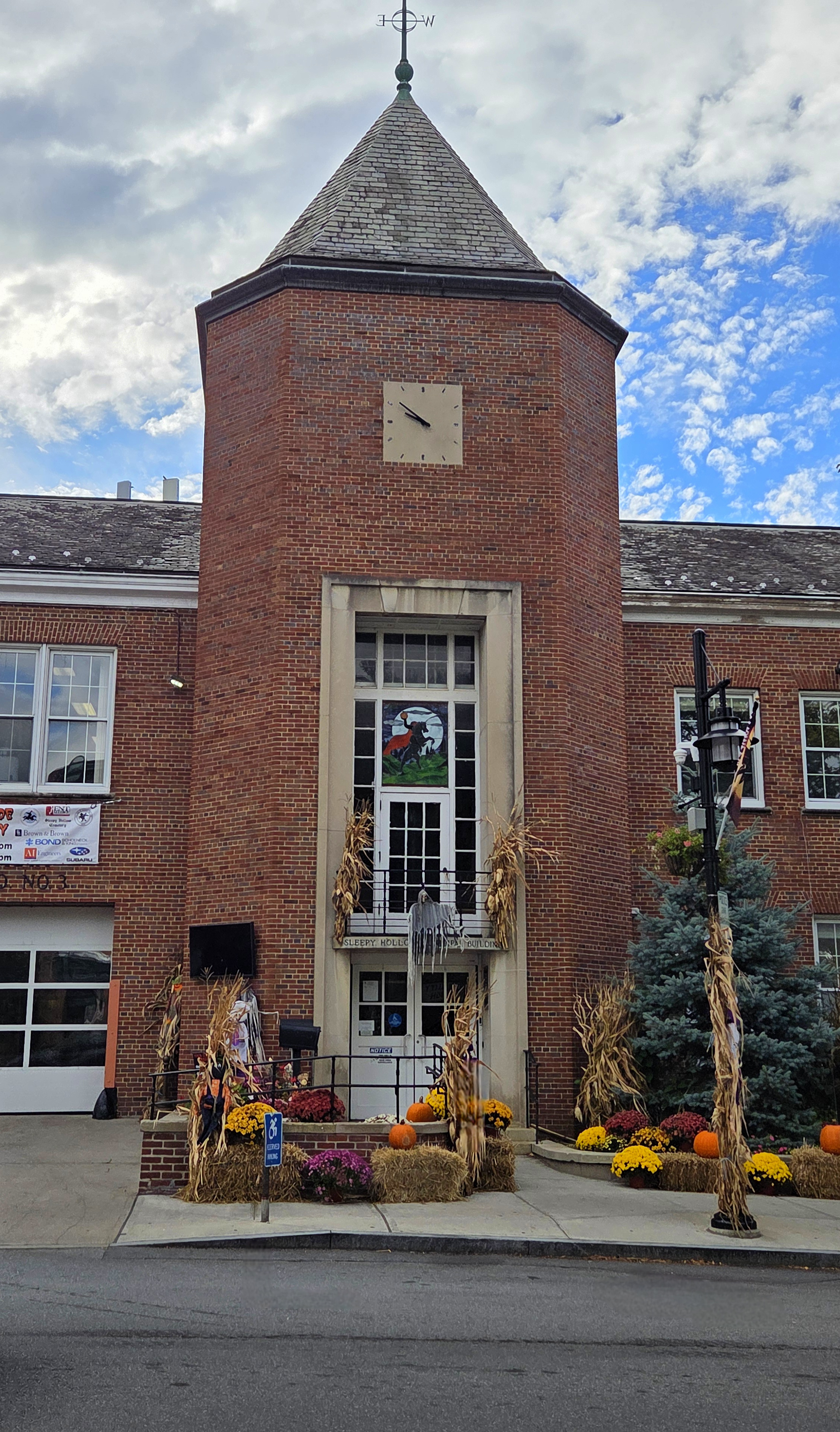
Sleepy Hollow Village Hall, with a stained glass window featuring the Headless Horseman

With its days as a factory town over, North Tarrytown began reconnecting with, and drawing upon, its storied history, literary heritage, and natural scenery of its surroundings. Much of its historic and natural sites survived the industrial era, largely through the restoration and preservation efforts of John D. Rockefeller Jr. and other members of several generations of the Rockefeller family. In 1996, the same year General Motors closed its North Tarrytown operations, the village voted to officially change its name to the historical name of the area immortalized in The Legend of Sleepy Hollow.

The idea of Sleepy Hollow disaffiliating from the town of Mount Pleasant has been raised periodically (most notably in the mid-1970s and again around 2007 by longtime mayor Philip Zegarelli) often as a way to consolidate services and save money by eliminating one layer of government. These attempts did not succeed.

After years of site decontamination and re-zoning, the former GM site was developed into several residential communities, the largest of which is Edge-on-Hudson. It is a village-within-a-village, with more than 1,100 residential units, that range from affordable housing and rental apartments to condominium buildings and luxury townhomes. Its street names, such as Legend Drive and Horseman Boulevard, commemorate Irving's The Legend of Sleepy Hollow, and its large DeCicco's supermarket hosts an exhibit of memorabilia from the 1999 movie Sleepy Hollow.

The former GM plant's waterfront, which was inaccessible to the public for more than a century, is now part of Westchester RiverWalk. Sleepy Hollow has become a tourist destination, especially during the Halloween season, when tens of thousands of people visit the village, drawn by its myths, legends and historic sites. In the words of Washington Irving,

the place still continues under the sway of some witching power, that holds a spell over the minds of the good people, causing them to walk in a continual reverie.

== Geography ==
Sleepy Hollow is located at 41°5′31″N 73°51′52″W (41.091998, −73.864361). According to the United States Census Bureau, the village has a total area of 5.1 square miles (13 km^{2}), of which 2.3 square miles (6.0 km^{2}) is land and 2.8 square miles (7.3 km^{2}), or 55.58%, is water.

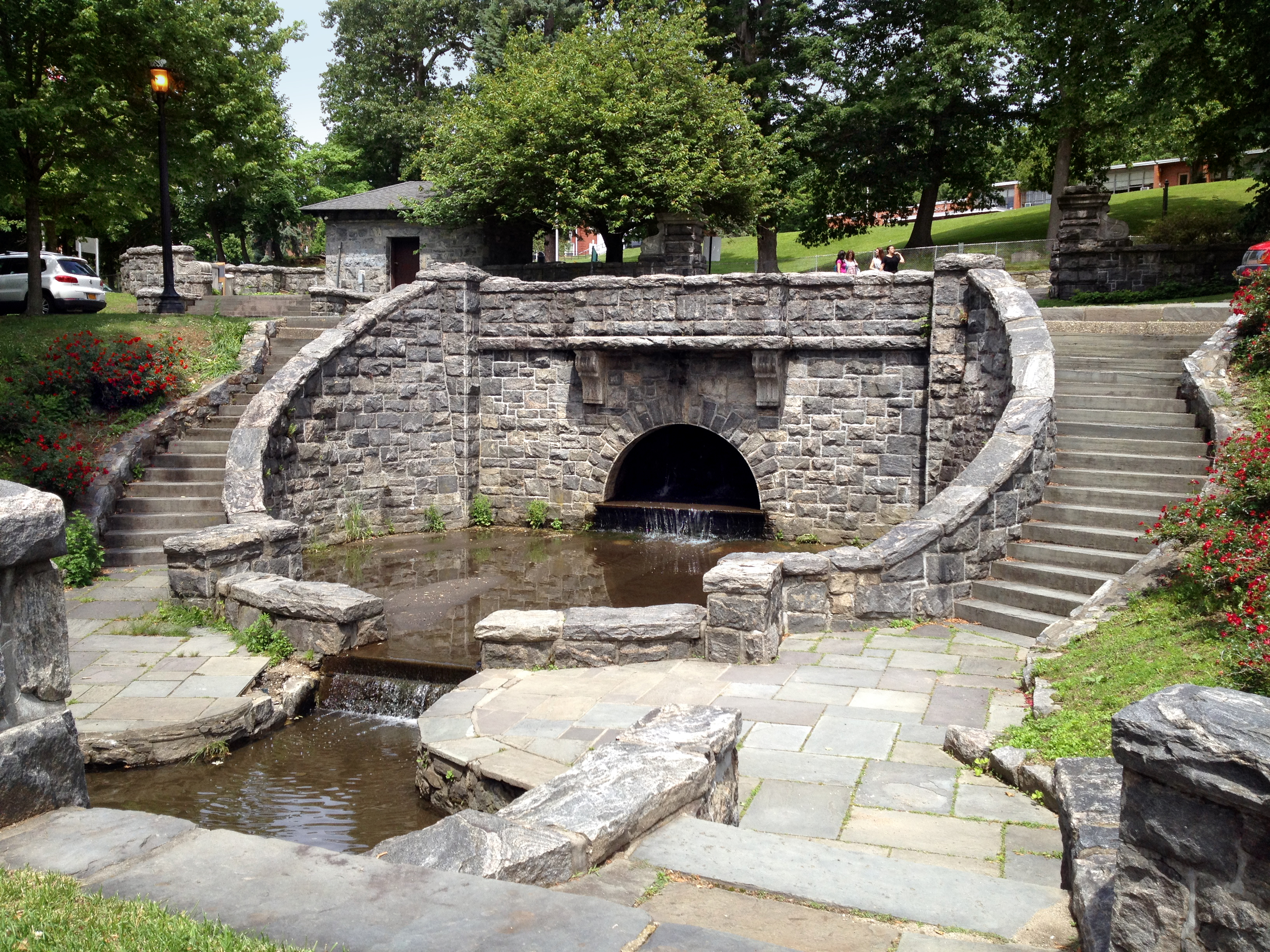
Andre Brook in Patriot's Park

The boundary between Tarrytown on the south and Sleepy Hollow on the north runs more or less along Andre Brook (Note: The common and official local spelling for the stream in Tarrytown and Sleepy Hollow is "Andre Brook" (without the accent).) (formerly, Clark's Kill). Since Tarrytown is part of the town of Greenburgh, and Sleepy Hollow is part of the town of Mount Pleasant, Andre Brook also forms the boundary between these towns. The brook originates on Kykuit Hill above the villages and empties into the Hudson River at Tarrytown Bay, near Tarrytown Boat Club. These days, the brook flows mostly through culverts under streets and roadways, daylighting in a few places near the Sleepy Hollow High School and in Patriot's Park.

The two villages share the postal (ZIP) code 10591.

Directly across the river from Sleepy Hollow is the village of Nyack in New York's Rockland County.

== Demographics ==
Historical population
Census	Pop.	Note	%±
1880	2,684		—
1890	3,179		18.4%
1900	4,241		33.4%
1910	5,421		27.8%
1920	5,927		9.3%
1930	7,417		25.1%
1940	8,804		18.7%
1950	8,740		−0.7%
1960	8,818		0.9%
1970	8,334		−5.5%
1980	7,994		−4.1%
1990	8,152		2.0%
2000	9,212		13.0%
2010	9,870		7.1%
2020	9,986		1.2%
U.S. Decennial Census

As of the census of 2010, there were 9,870 people, 3,181 households, and 2,239 families residing in the village. The population density was 4,054.7 people per square mile (1,565.5 people/km^{2}). There were 3,253 housing units at an average density of 1,431.8 per square mile (552.8/km^{2}). The racial makeup of the village was 61.0% White, 6.2% African American, 0.8% Native American, 3.3% Asian, <0.1% Pacific Islander, 23.5% from other races, and 5.2% from two or more races. Hispanic or Latino people of any race were 51.0% of the population, many of whom are Ecuadorian, Dominican, Chilean, and Puerto Rican. Sleepy Hollow has one of the highest proportions of Ecuadorian American residents of any community nationwide, standing at 17.5% as of the 2010 census.

There were 3,181 households, out of which 36.0% had children under the age of 18 living with them, 51.5% were married couples living together, 13.4% had a female householder with no husband present, and 29.6% were non-families. 23.0% of all households were made up of individuals, and 8.7% had someone living alone who was 65 years of age or older. The average household size was 2.89 and the average family size was 3.37.

In the village, the population was spread out, with 25.0% under the age of 18, 8.9% from 18 to 24, 36.7% from 25 to 44, 18.9% from 45 to 64, and 10.5% who were 65 years of age or older. The median age was 34 years. For every 100 females, there were 103.0 males. For every 100 females age 18 and over, there were 101.9 males.

The median income for a household in the village was $54,201, and the median income for a family was $63,889. Males had a median income of $39,923 versus $32,146 for females. The per capita income for the village was $28,325. About 5.7% of families and 7.4% of the population were below the poverty line, including 9.3% of those under age 18 and 7.9% of those age 65 or over.

== Notable landmarks ==
The village is home to the above-mentioned Old Dutch Church of Sleepy Hollow and Philipsburg Manor House, both listed as National Historic Landmarks. Local sites listed in the National Register of Historic Places (NRHP) are the Sleepy Hollow Cemetery, Patriot's Park, the Edward Harden Mansion, the Philipse Manor Railroad Station with its Grand Central Eagle, the Tarrytown Light, and the linear Old Croton Aqueduct State Historic Park, segments of which run through Sleepy Hollow.

=== Gallery ===
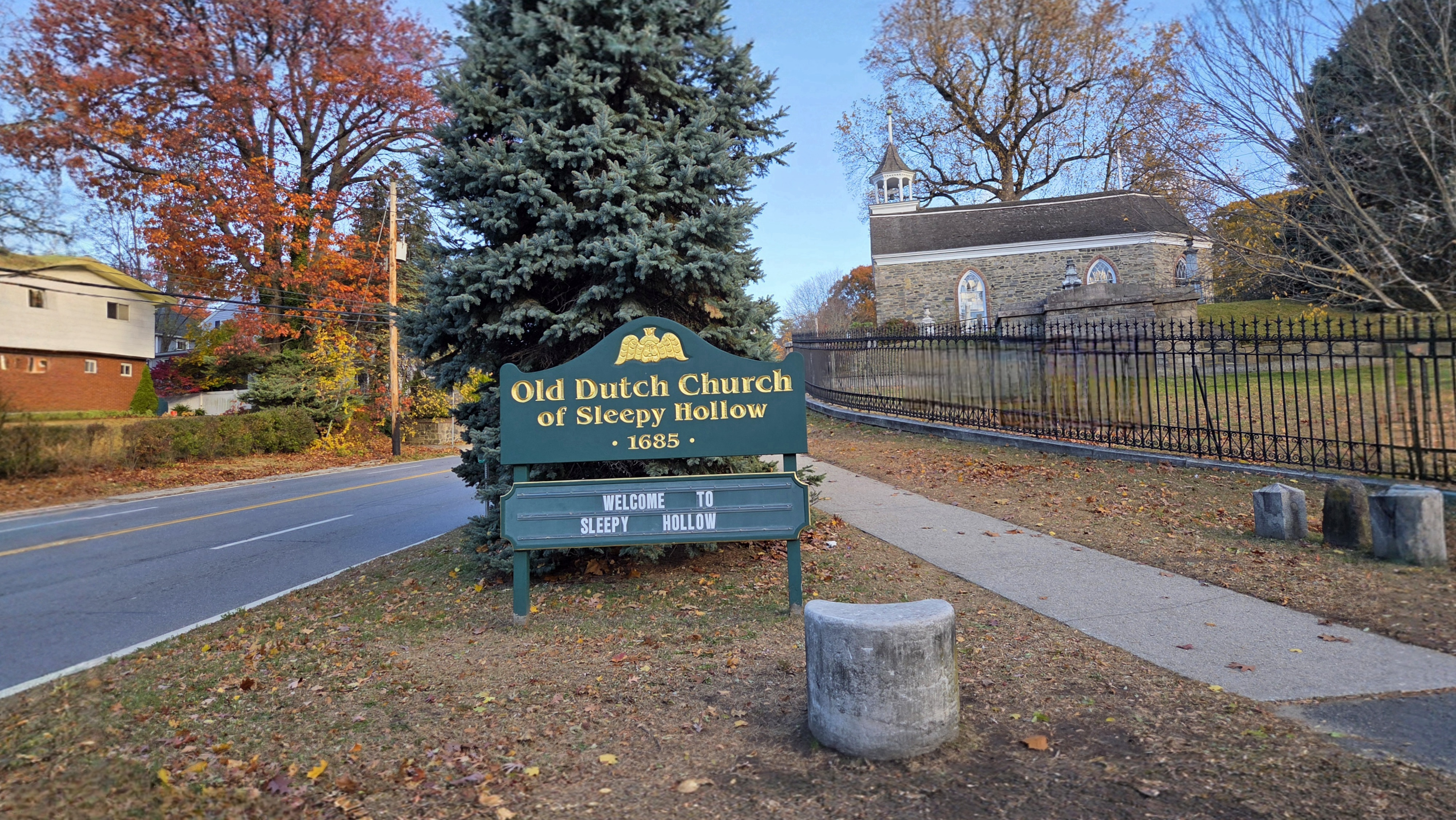
Old Dutch Church, historic mile marker, and mounting block

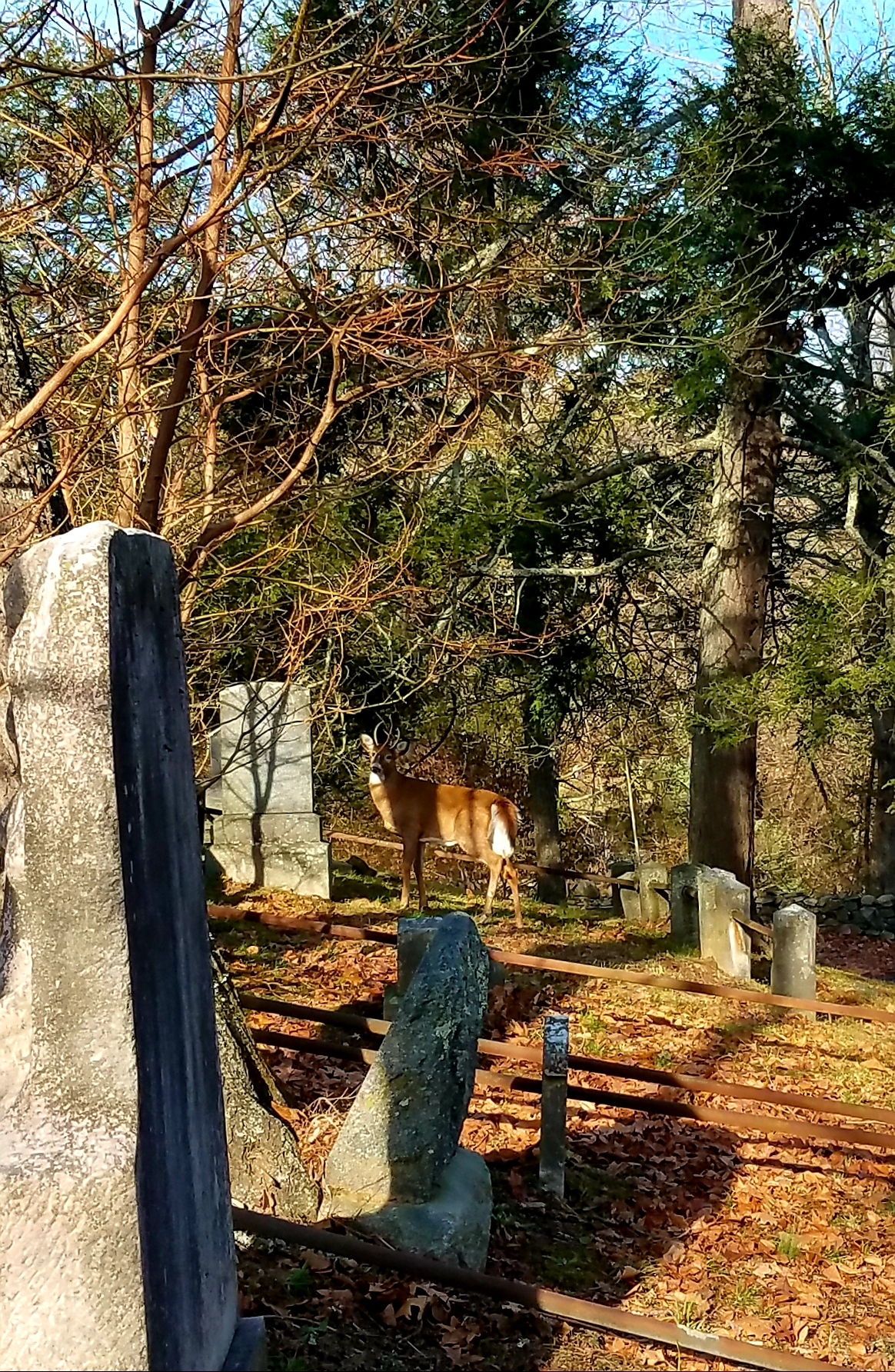
Sleepy Hollow Cemetery

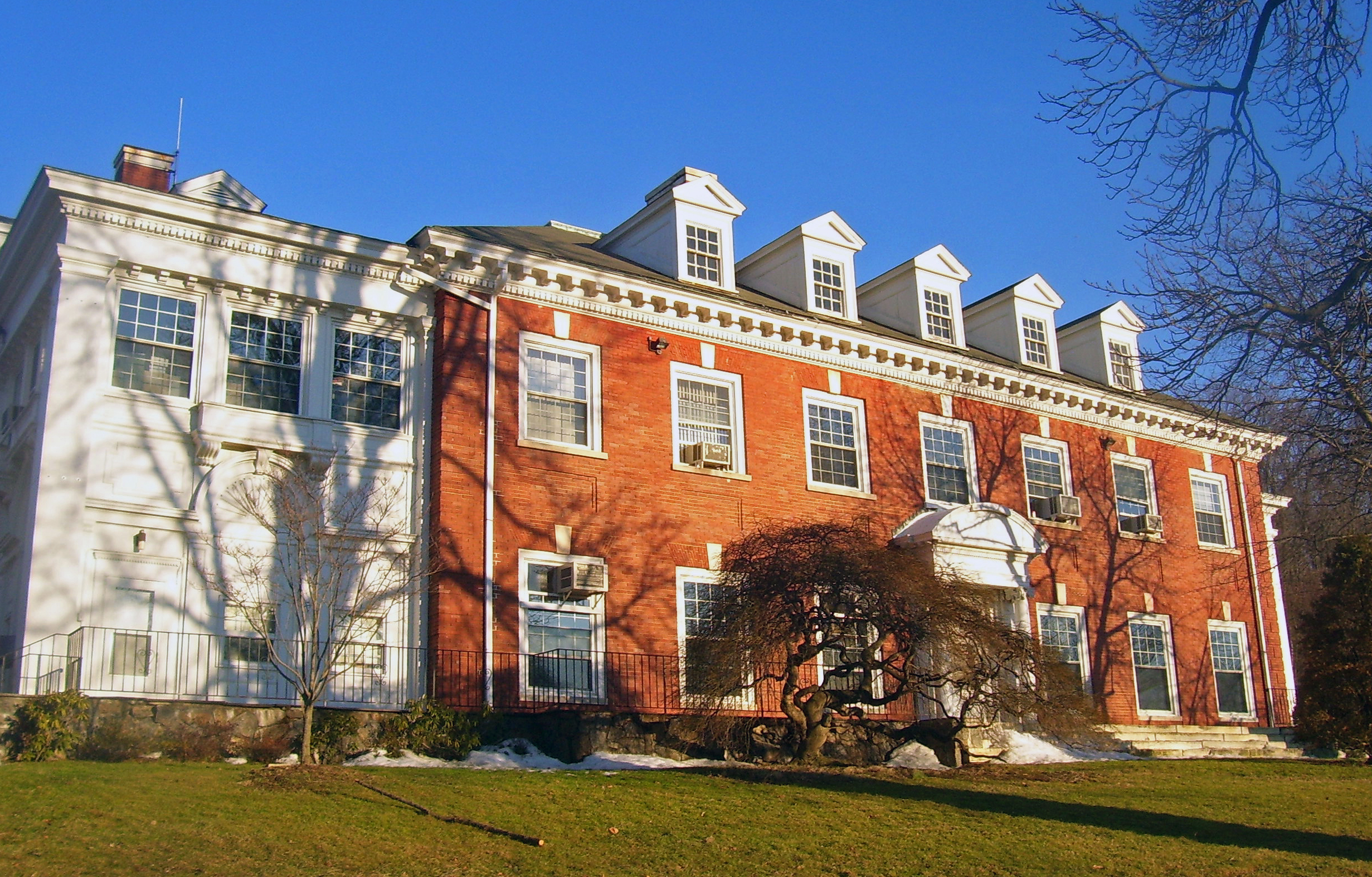
Edward Harden Mansion

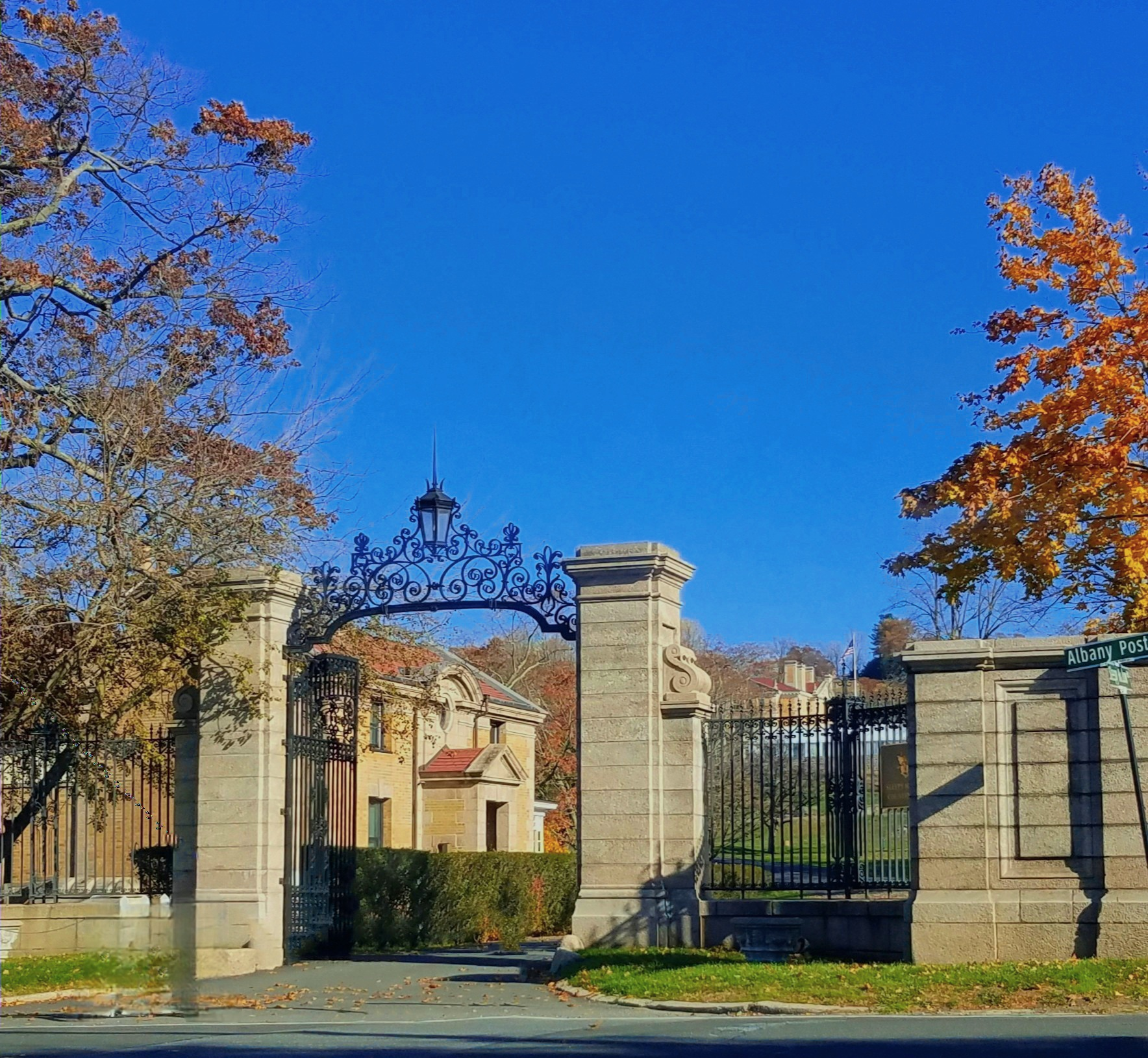
Entrance to the Sleepy Hollow Country Club

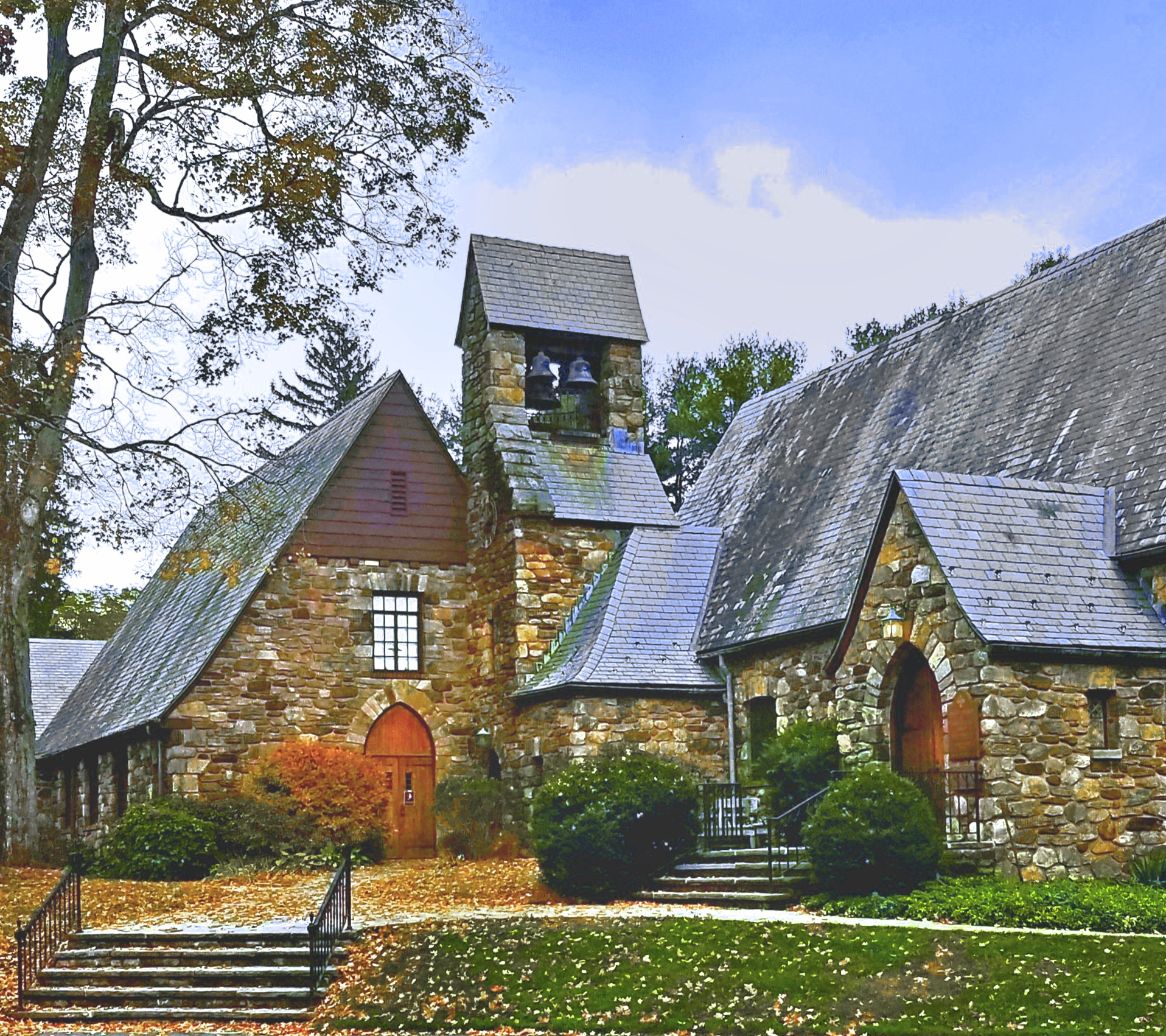
Union Church of Pocantico Hills

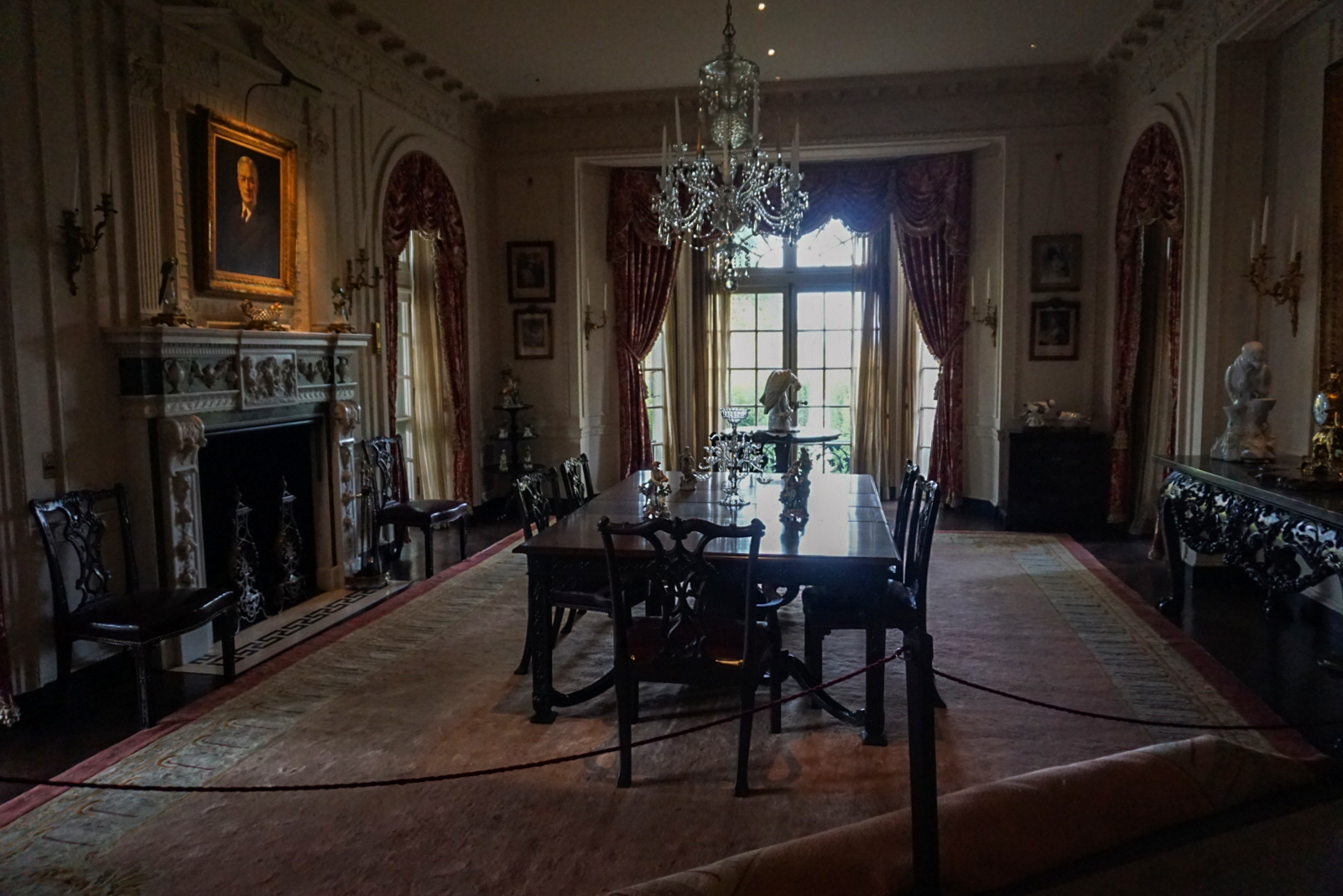
Kykuit

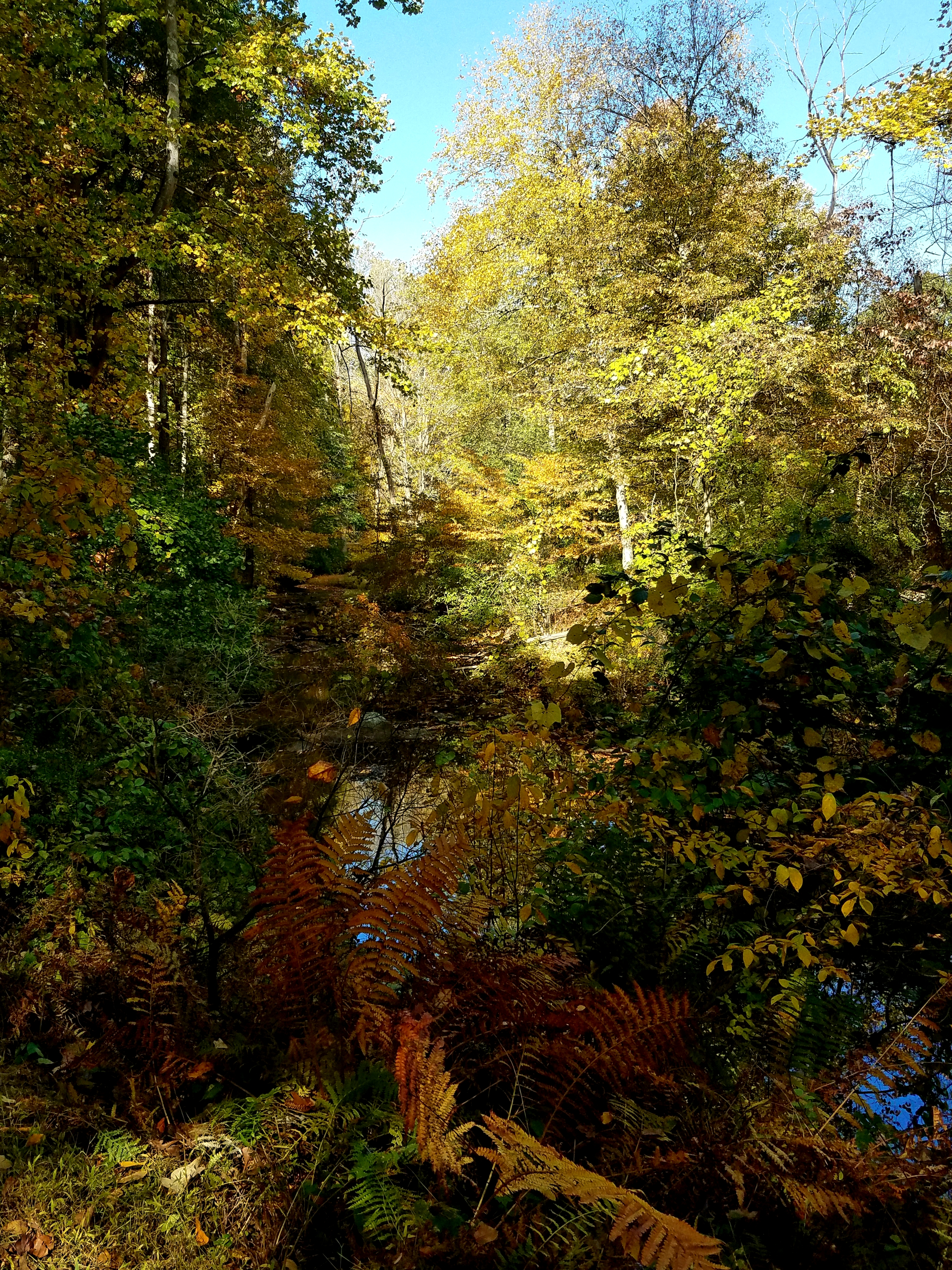
Rockefeller State Park Preserve

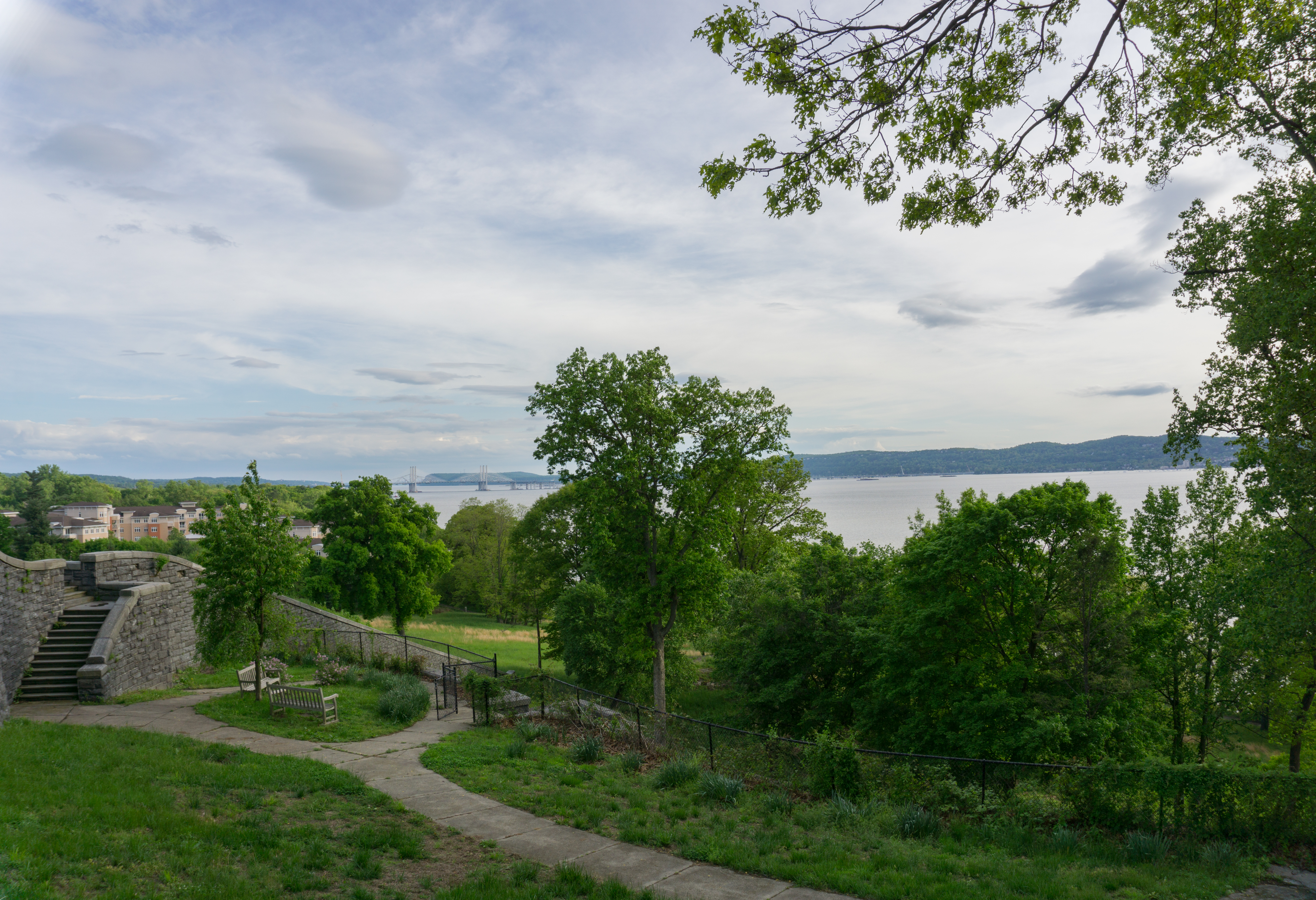
Rockwood Hall

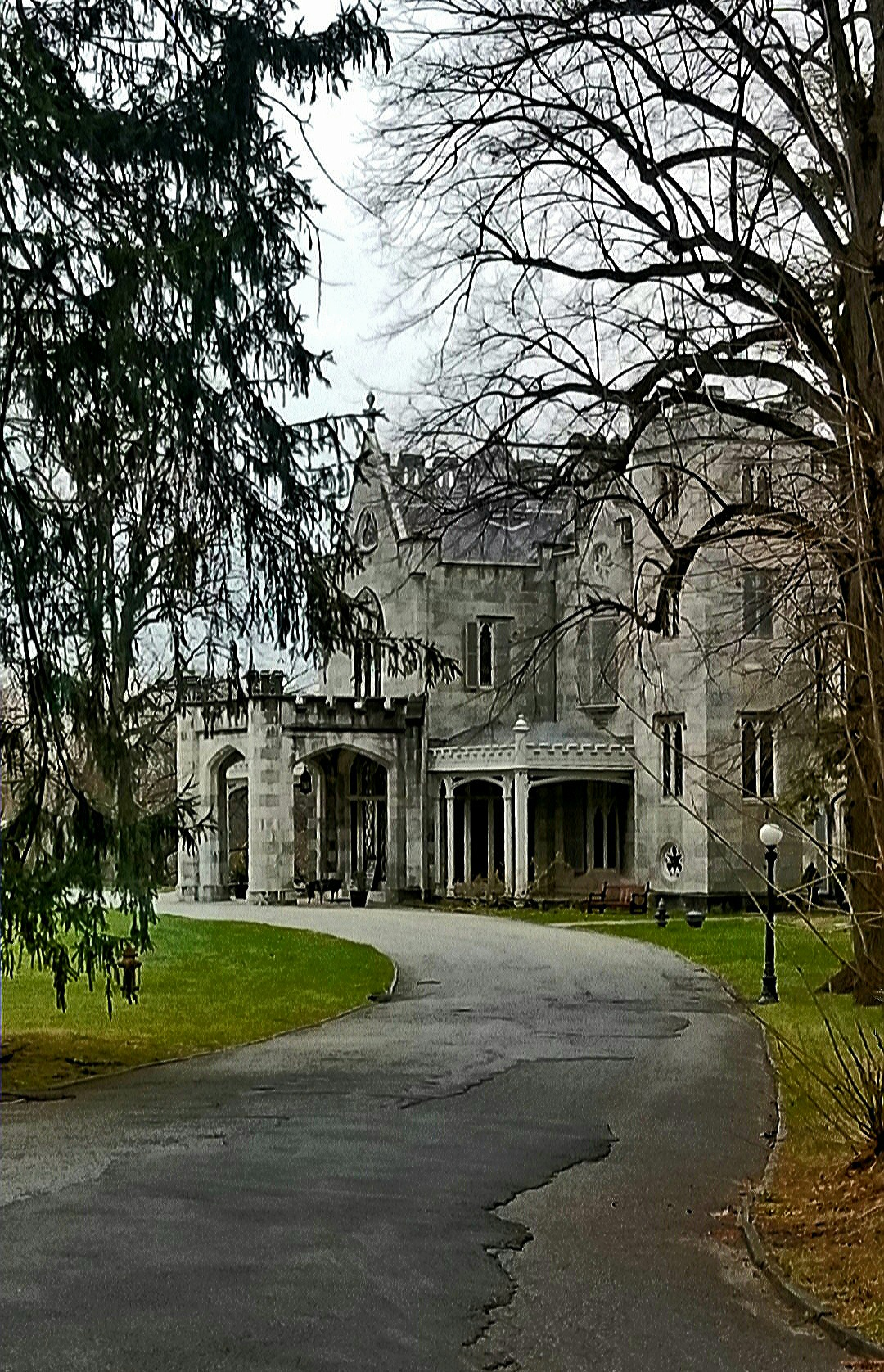
Lyndhurst

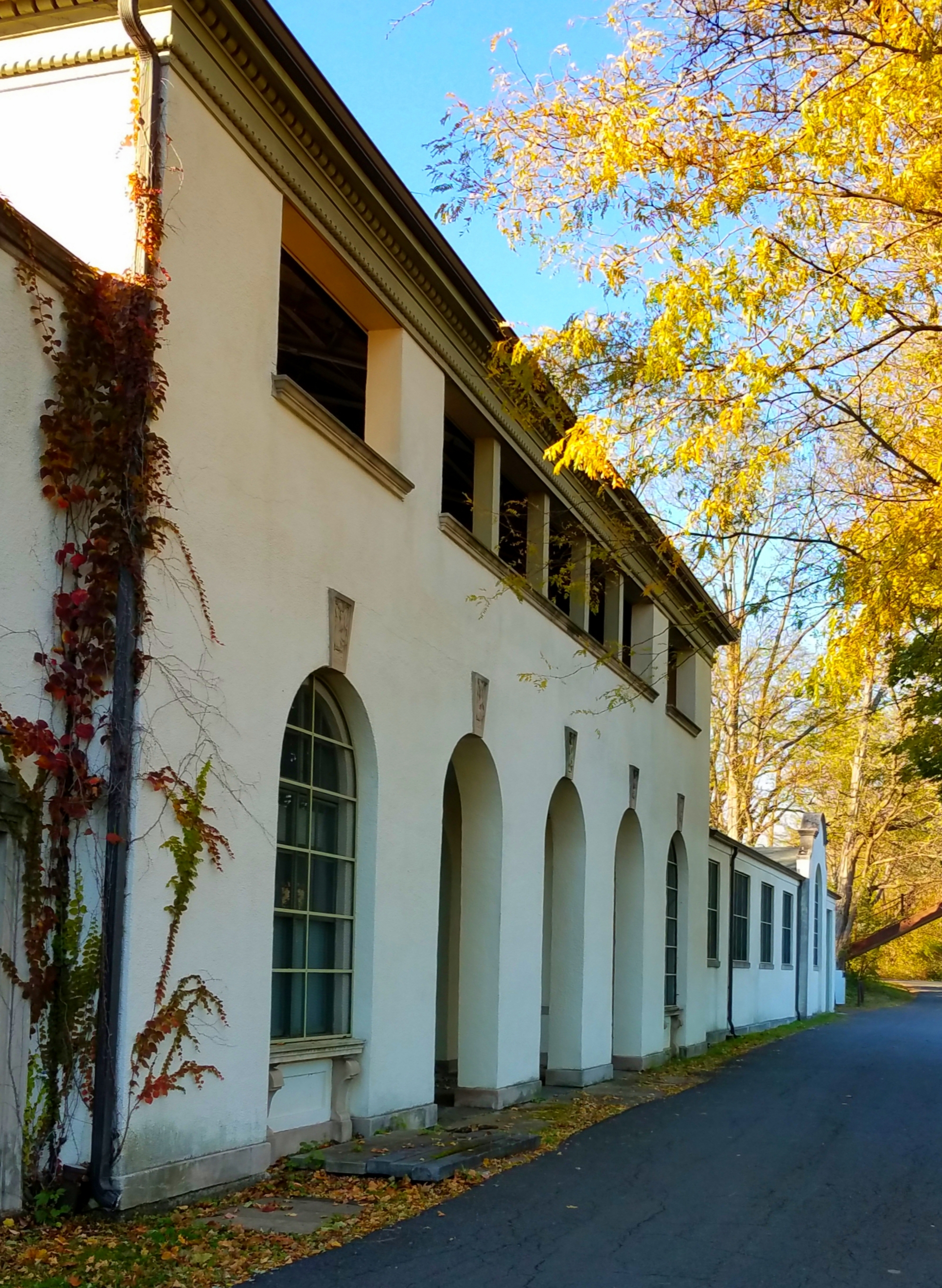
Italianate bathhouse in Kingsland Point Park

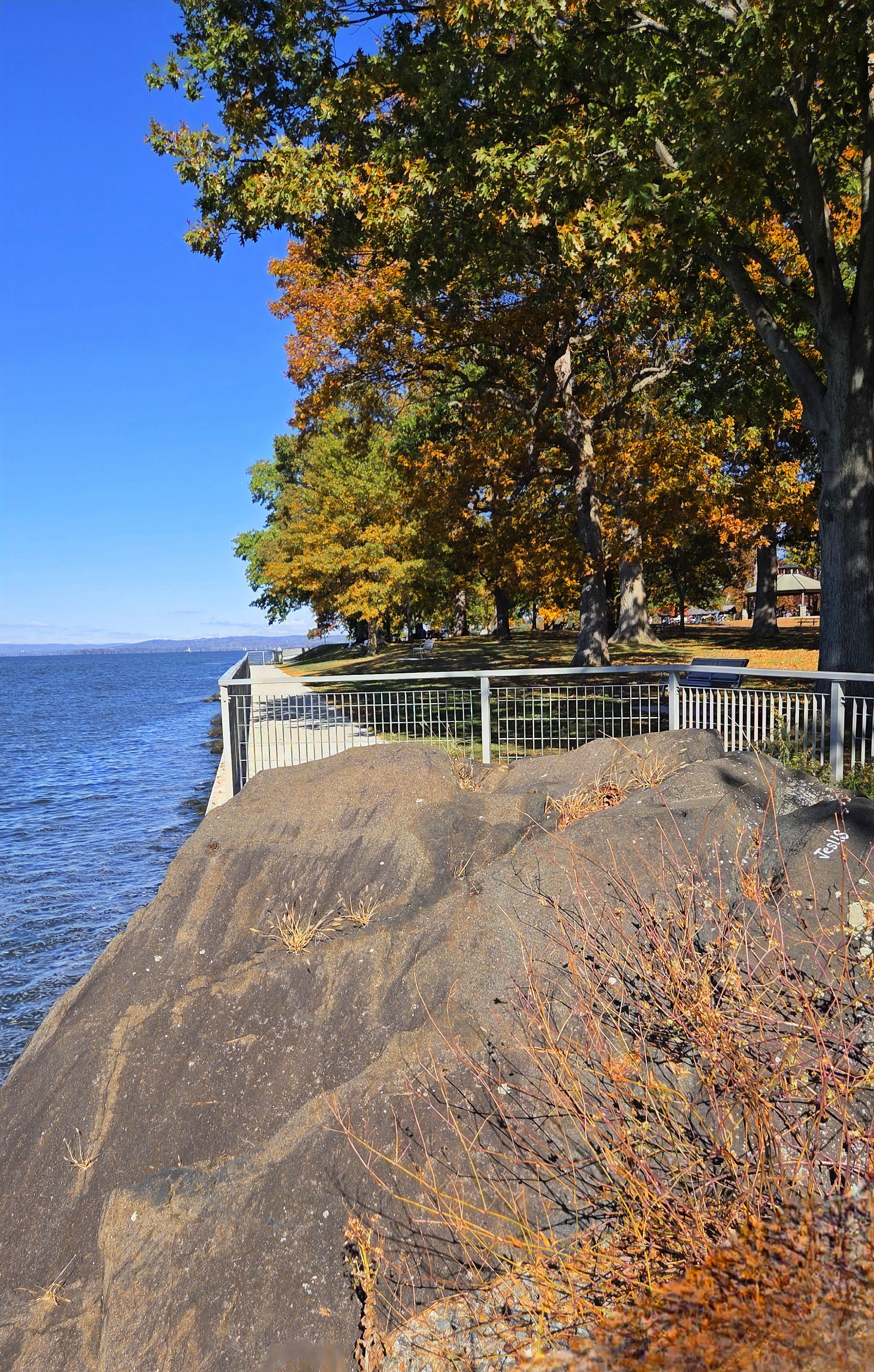
Kidd's Rock

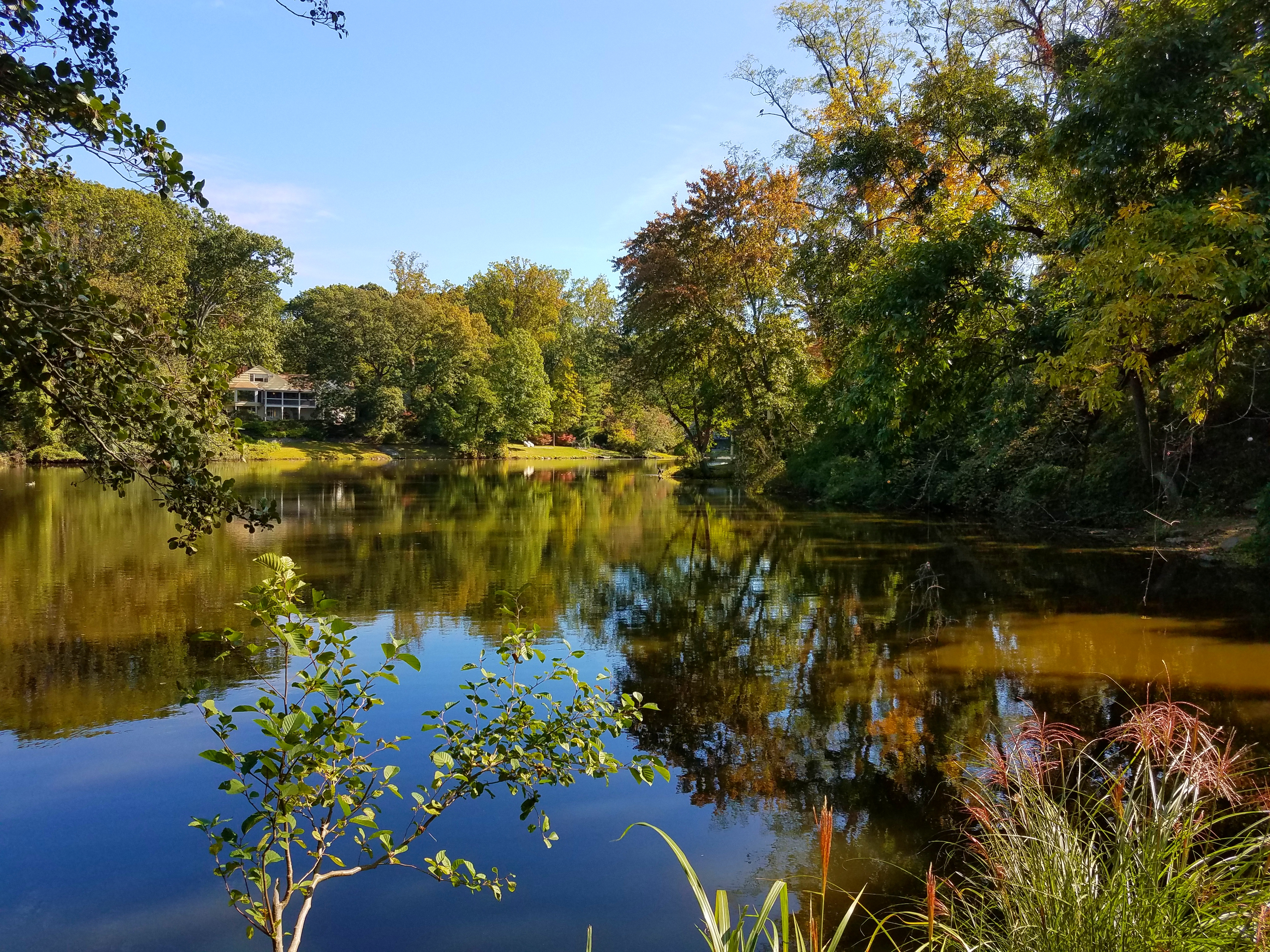
Fremont Pond in Sleepy Hollow Manor neighborhood

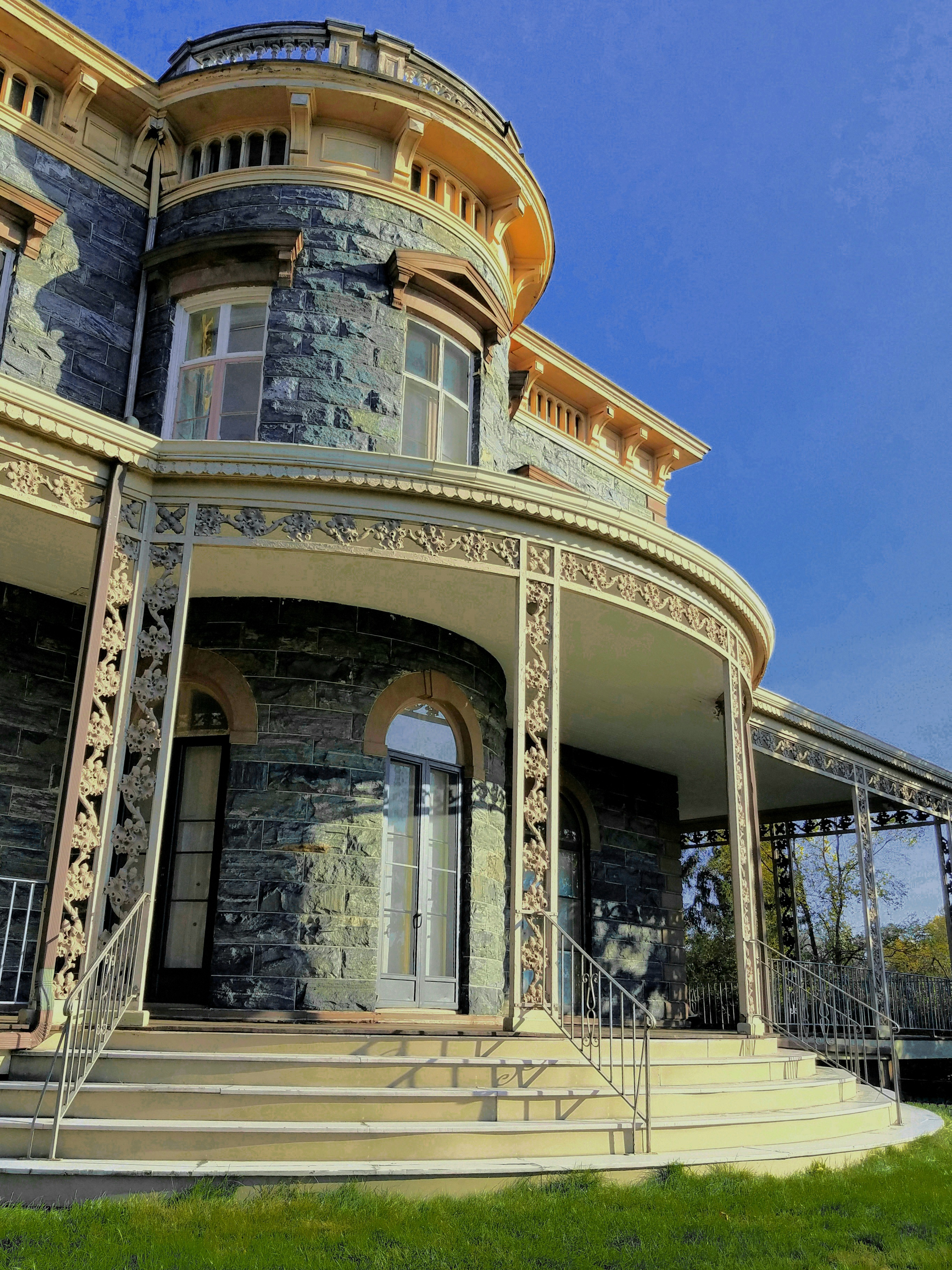
Phelps-James House

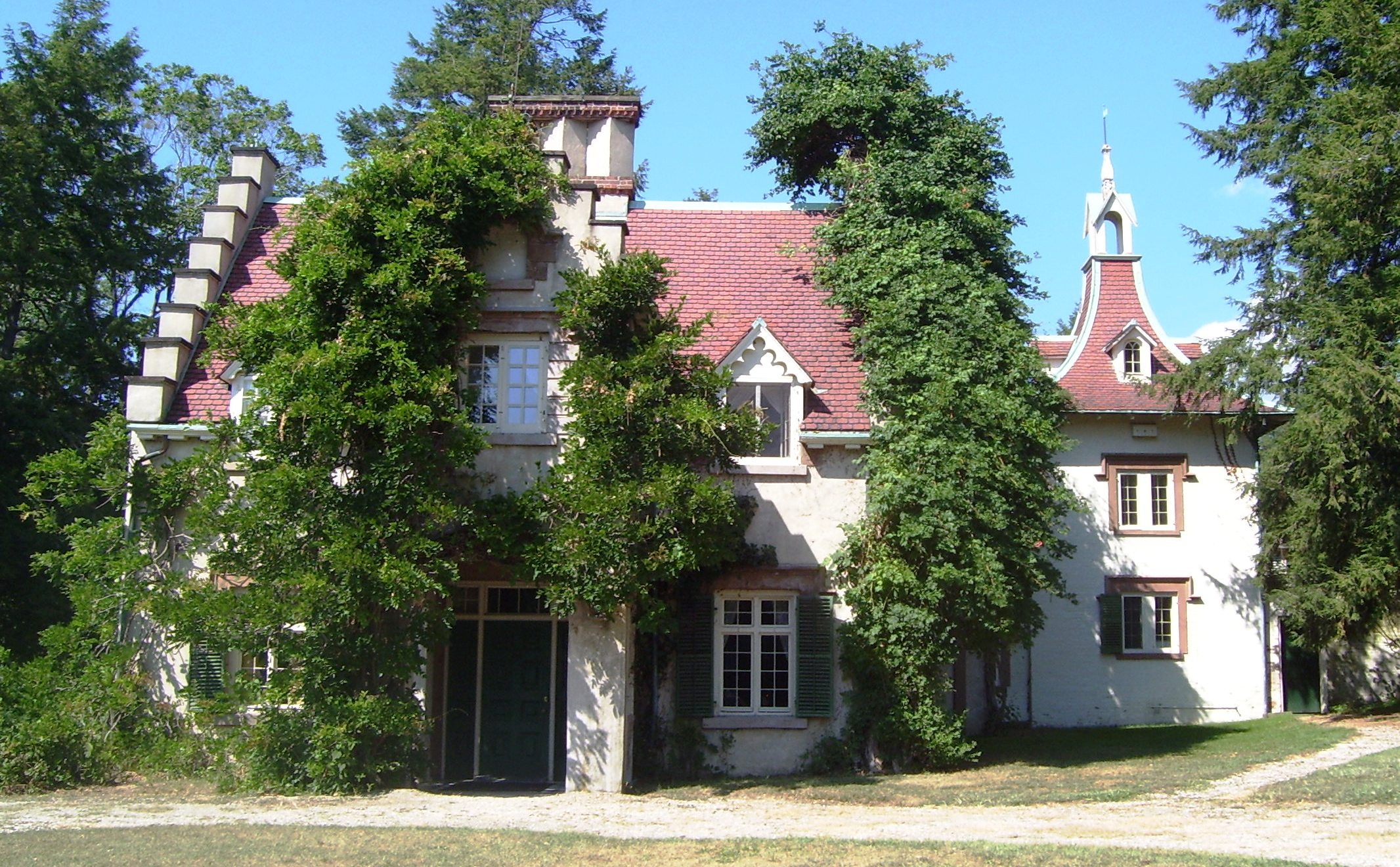
Sunnyside

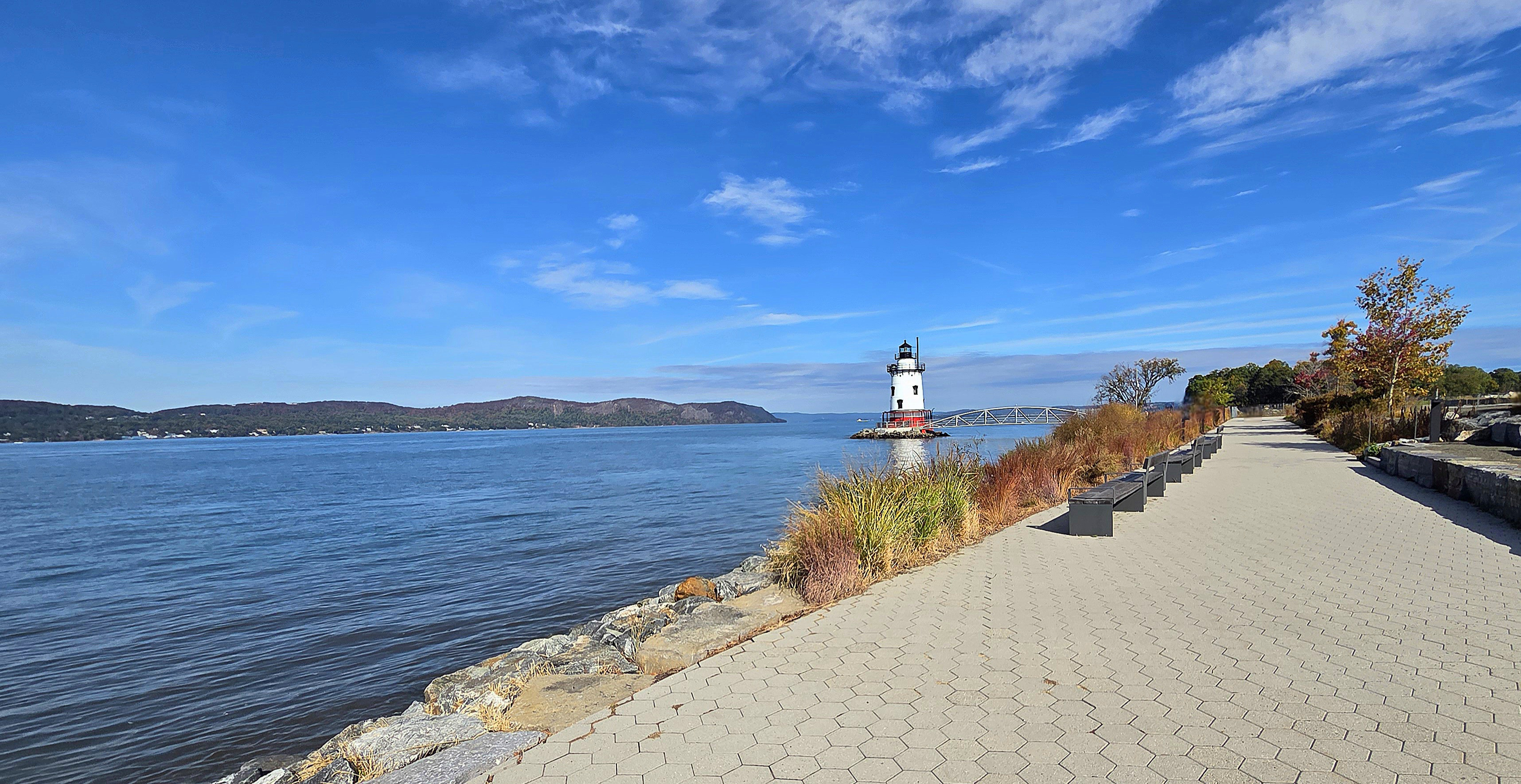
Westchester RiverWalk, with a view of Tappan Zee and Tarrytown Light

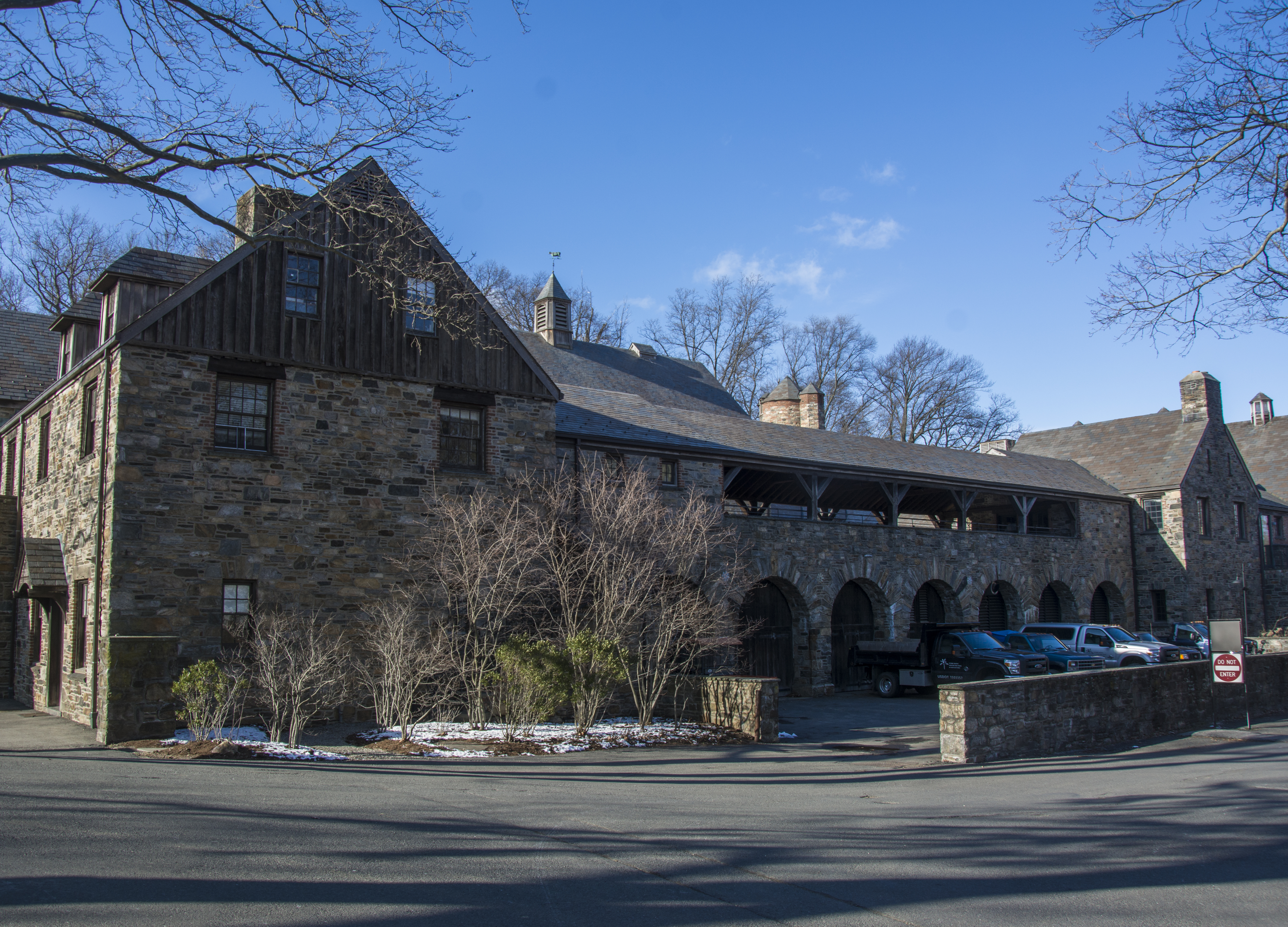
Stone Barns Center for Food & Agriculture

Just outside the village boundaries are several more sites listed in the NRHP, including the Rockefeller estate, Kykuit; the Scarborough Historic District, with Sleepy Hollow Country Club as its contributing property; and the Union Church of Pocantico Hills. Rockefeller State Park Preserve (on the New York State Register of Historic Places) abuts the Sleepy Hollow Cemetery. Part of the preserve containing the remnants of William Rockefeller Jr.'s estate, Rockwood Hall, lies just north of Sleepy Hollow's Phelps Hospital. On the campus of the hospital, across the road from Rockwood Hall, sits the Phelps-James House, one of a few remaining mid-19th-century mansions in the lower Hudson Valley. The granite and brownstone mansion, which combines Victorian Gothic and Italianate architectural styles, was built in 1851 for the son of copper magnate Anson Green Phelps; it is now a rental venue. A four-season farm, gardens, and greenhouses, all focused on sustainable agriculture, are present at the Stone Barns Center for Food & Agriculture in Pocantico Hills.

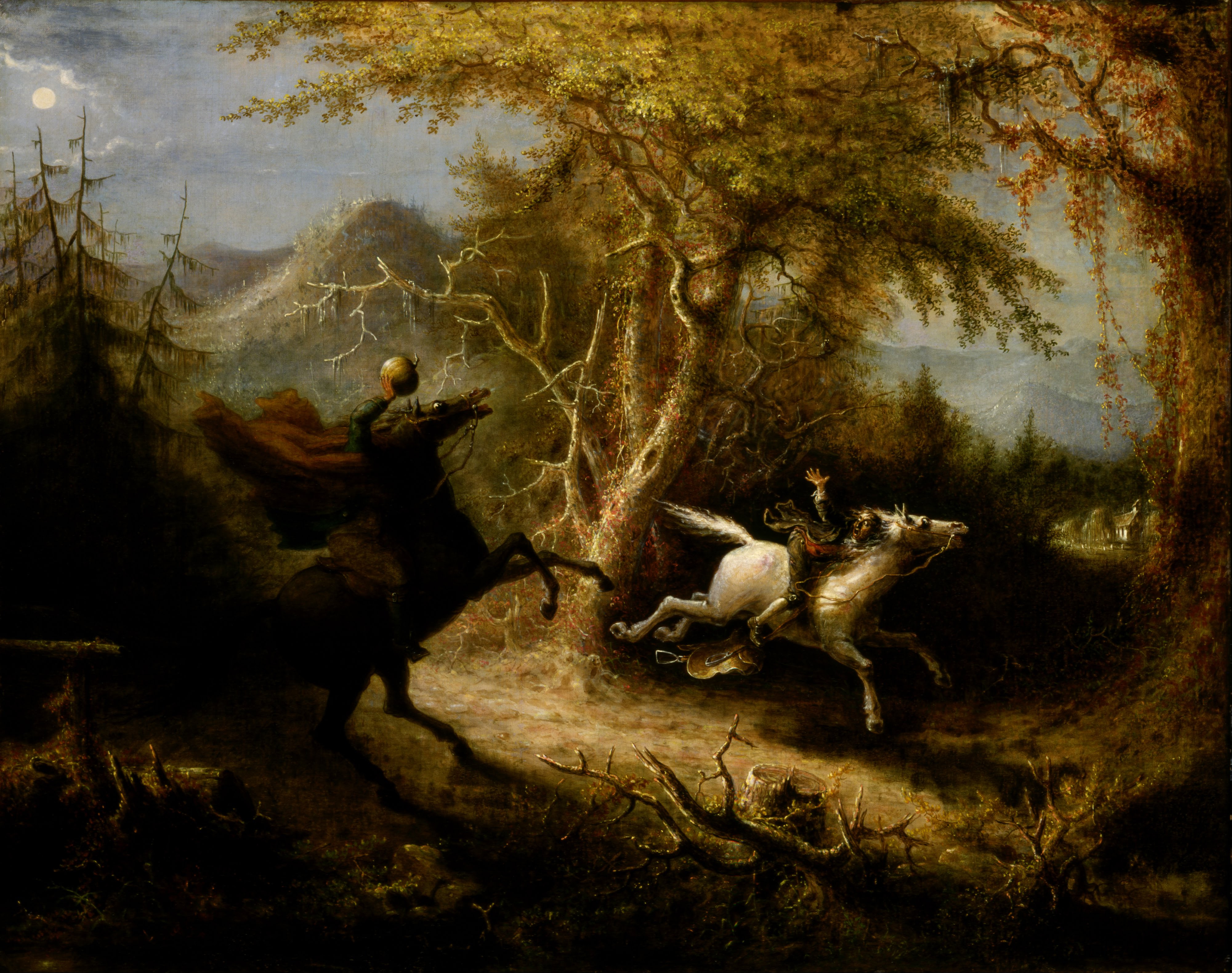
The Headless Horseman Pursuing Ichabod Crane, the 1858 painting by John Quidor. Visible in the background is the Old Dutch Church and its churchyard.

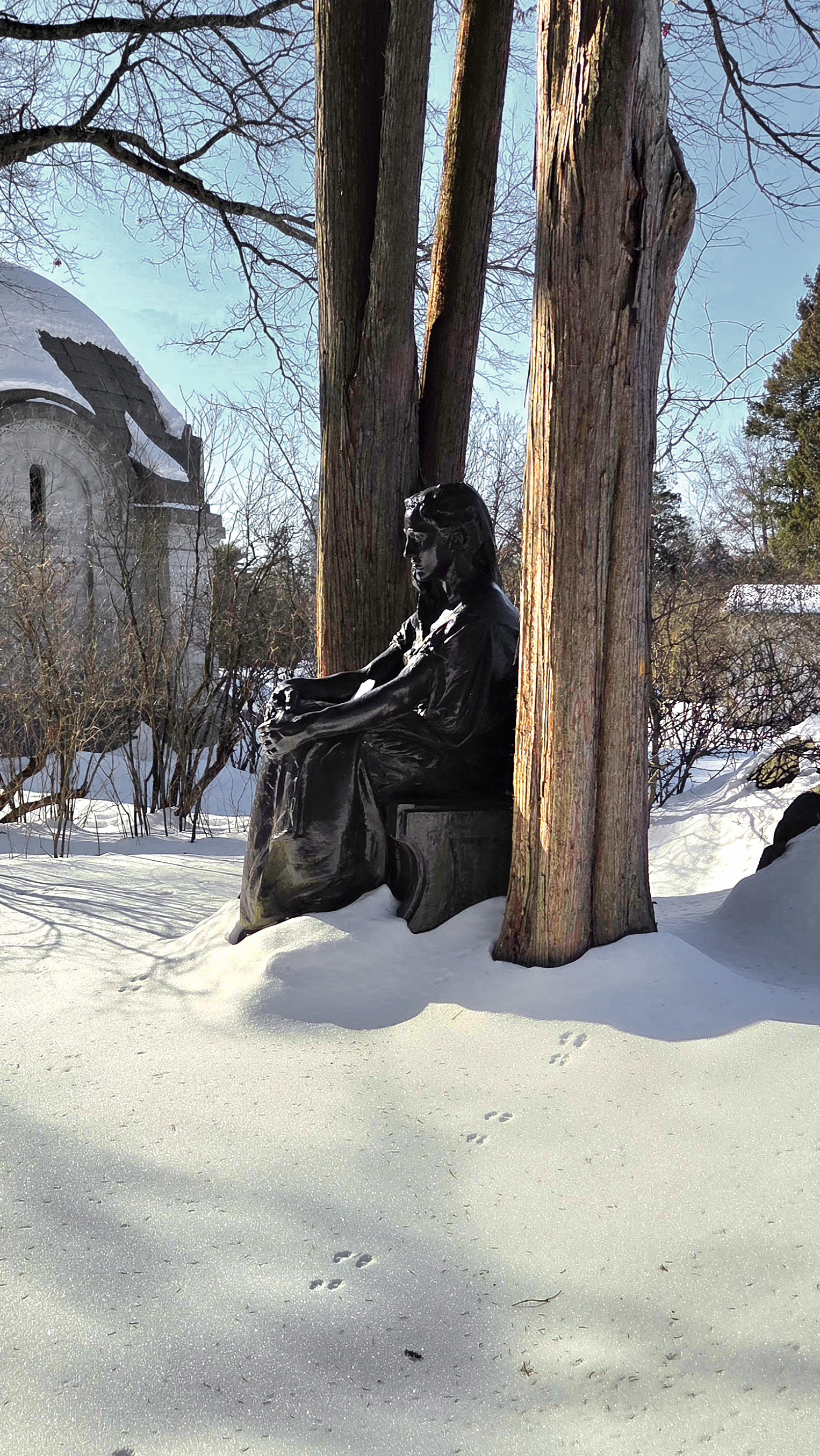
Bronze Lady in Sleepy Hollow Cemetery, a staple of local lore

Sleepy Hollow’s northernmost neighborhood, Sleepy Hollow Manor, contains meandering tree-lined streets and houses built in the 1920s and 1930s on the former Rancho Pokahoe estate of John C. Frémont. As of 2015, the Frémont house still overlooks the Hudson River there. Also of note is Kingsland Point Park with its Italianate bathhouse designed in 1926 by architect Walter Dabney Blair and the massive Kidd's Rock, embedded in the park's riverwall. According to local lore, the boulder was a clandestine meeting place for Frederick Philipse and Captain Kidd, a privateer-turned-pirate and allegedly a business associate of Philipse.

On Broadway (U.S. Route 9), near the Old Dutch Church, an 18th-century milestone that reads "Miles from New York 28" (Note: It is debated if this milestone is in its original location or was moved there in the 19th century from a place somewhat to the south. Most surviving 18th-century mile markers on the historic Albany Post Road are not in their original locations; at some point in their history, they were moved to protected settings, such as the grounds of neighboring historic sites, or embedded in retaining walls.) is present, along with an old mounting block, once used for getting into carriages and mounting horses. Broadway was part of the historic Albany Post Road, and milestones were placed along it to assist travelers with navigation and to help calculate postage delivery fees. Broadway, New York's longest street, ends less than a mile north of this stone marker, on the northern boundary of Sleepy Hollow. In 1913, William Rockefeller Jr., whose Rockwood Hall estate bordered the former Frémont property, installed a roadside drinking fountain in Frémont's memory at the very end of Broadway (on Albany Post Road), across from the former Rancho Pokahoe estate. The General John C. Frémont Memorial Fountain (also called the Cold Spring Fountain), with a commemorative plaque, still exists, though it is no longer functional; it is the last of the many public fountains that were once located all over the village and area, serving to refresh travelers and horses.

Also on Broadway, within 5 miles (8 km) to the south of Sleepy Hollow, are two famous National Historic Landmarks–Washington Irving's Sunnyside home and the distinctive Gothic Revival mansion, Lyndhurst; both are much-visited museums.

Numerous sites and locations in and around Sleepy Hollow are associated with myths and legends, such as the "haunted" Raven Rock and Spook Rock in what is now the Rockefeller State Park Preserve, the Bronze Lady statue in Sleepy Hollow Cemetery (a centerpiece of local legendry), and the Burying Ground of the Old Dutch Church of Sleepy Hollow, the final resting place of many people who inspired The Legend of Sleepy Hollow.

The whole neighborhood abounds with local tales, haunted spots, and twilight superstitions: stars shoot and meteors glare oftener across the valley than in any other part of the country, and the nightmare, with her whole nine fold, seems to make it the favorite scene of her gambols.

== Emergency services ==
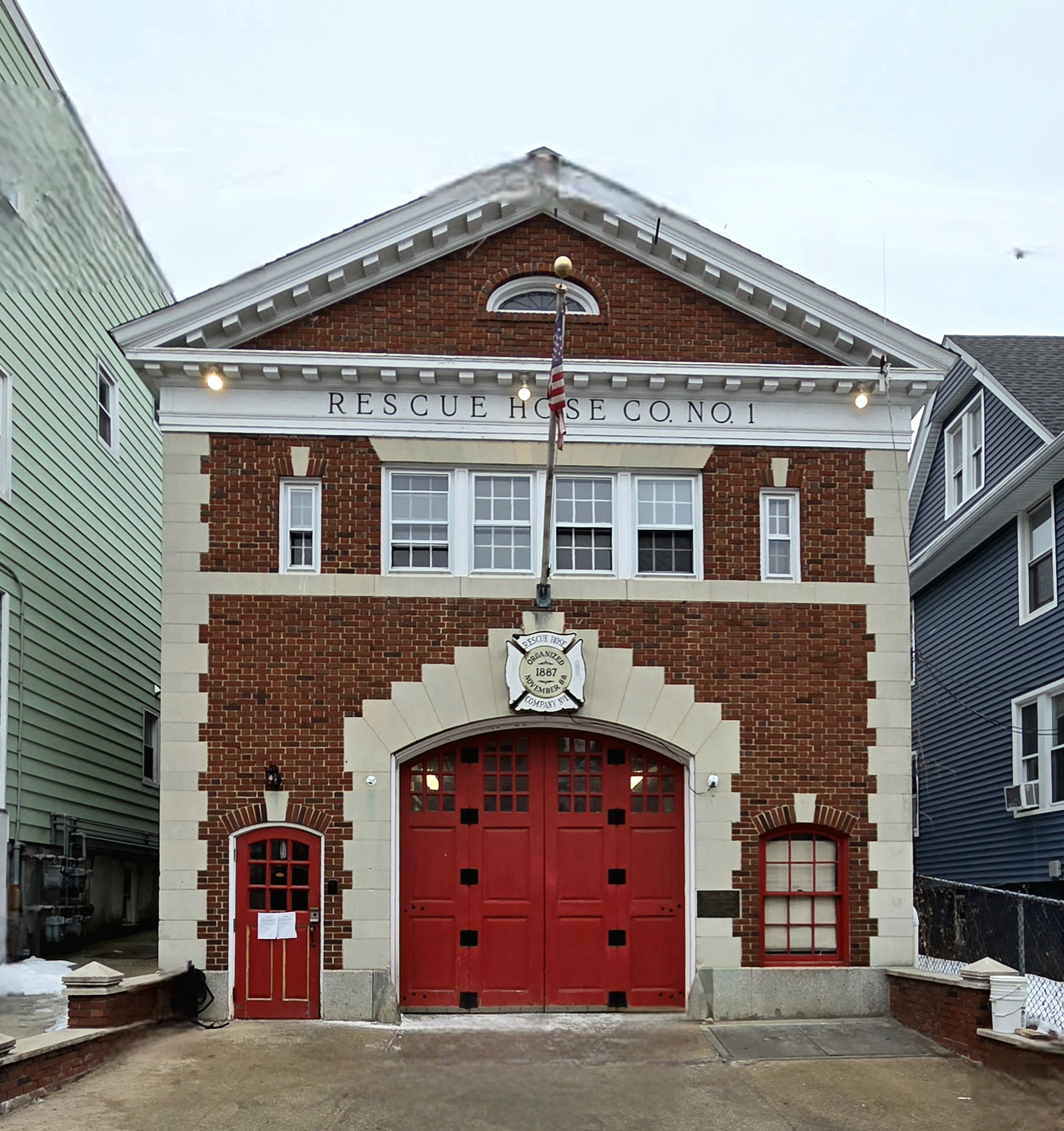
Rescue Hose Company No. 1, 11 Lawrence Ave., organized following the "Great Book Bindery Fire" of 1887. This fire station is famous for its door.

As of 2025, the village's police department had 24 officers, six school crossing guards, and 10 civilian employees. The village is also served by the New York State Police and Westchester County Department of Public Safety. The Westchester County Marine Unit provides police coverage and services along the Westchester County side of the Hudson River.

The Sleepy Hollow Fire Department (SHFD) began with organization of the North Tarrytown Fire Patrol on May 26, 1876. Within 25 years it had grown to five companies in three fire stations. As of 2025, there were three engines, one tower ladder, one rescue, two fireboats and other equipment. The fire department is run by volunteers and responds to over 300 calls each year.

Emergency medical services in Sleepy Hollow depend on volunteers assisted by paid staff. The Ambulance Corps has two basic life support ambulances and an EMT fly-car. Mount Pleasant Paramedics provides advanced life support. The award-winning Emergency Department of the local Phelps Hospital sees more than 28,000 patient visits annually.

== Education ==
Sleepy Hollow is in Union Free School District of the Tarrytowns. Sleepy Hollow High School is consistently ranked in the top 5-10% of high schools in New York State. The school's mascot is the Headless Horseman. Younger students attend John Paulding School for prekindergarten and kindergarten, W. L. Morse School for first and second grades, and Washington Irving Intermediate School for grades three through five.

The Warner Library, member of Westchester Library System, is located on North Broadway just south of Patriot's Park where Tarrytown ends and Sleepy Hollow begins. The library has served both villages since 1929. It was built and gifted to the two communities by Worcester Reed Warner, a mechanical engineer, industrialist, and philanthropist, and his wife Cornelia.

== In popular culture ==
Sleepy Hollow has been used as a setting or filming location for numerous media works, including films, games, literature, motion pictures, and television productions, including:

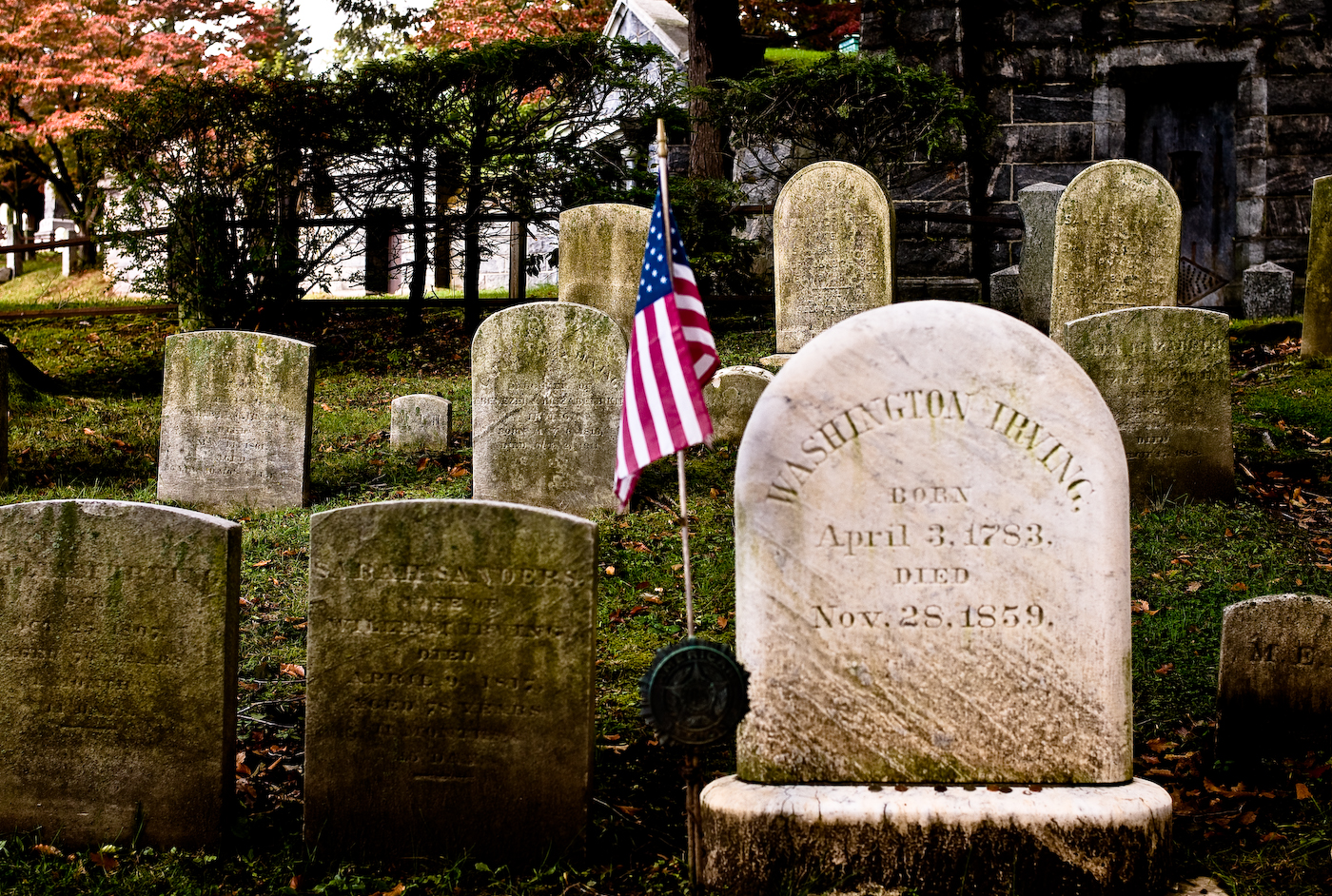
Washington Irving's headstone in Sleepy Hollow Cemetery

Literature

- Sleepy Hollow is the setting of Washington Irving's short story The Legend of Sleepy Hollow (1820), its many adaptations in other media, and its major characters, Ichabod Crane and The Headless Horseman.

Films

- The Headless Horseman (1922)
- The Headless Horseman (1934)
- The Curse of the Cat People (1944)
- The second segment of Walt Disney's The Adventures of Ichabod and Mr. Toad (1949)
- The Scarlet Coat (1955), partially about American Revolutionary War general Benedict Arnold's associate John Andre's pivotal real-life capture in the village
- the adaptation of the Dark Shadows television series, House of Dark Shadows (1970)
- Woody Allen's Mighty Aphrodite (1995)
- Sidney Lumet's Gloria remake (1999)
- The Thomas Crown Affair remake (1999)
- Tim Burton's Sleepy Hollow (1999), shot primarily in England
- The Family Man (2000)
- Super Troopers (2001)
- Lord of War (2005)
- Robert De Niro's The Good Shepherd (2006)
- Why Stop Now (2012)
- The English Teacher (2013)
- The Smurfs: The Legend of Smurfy Hollow (2013)
- the Stephen King adaptation A Good Marriage (2014)
- the adaptation of The Girl on the Train (2016)
- The Dinner (2017)
- The Meyerowitz Stories (2017), filmed primarily in and around Northwell Health's Phelps Memorial Hospital Center
- Wonderstruck (2017)
- The Netflix Halloween film The Curse of Bridge Hollow (2022), which substitutes the Headless Horseman legend with the lore of Stingy Jack in a thinly veiled contemporary Sleepy Hollow, refers to the "safest small city in America" distinction.

Games

- One of the locations in Magicland Dizzy is named after the village (1990).
- Sleepy Hollow is a location in the game Assassin's Creed Rogue (2014).

Television

- "The Headless Horseman of Halloween" episode of The Scooby Doo Show (1976)
- The Legend of Sleepy Hollow (1980), TV movie starring Jeff Goldblum, Paul Sand, and Meg Foster.
- The four-season Fox series Sleepy Hollow, though set in and around the village through the centuries, greatly expanded its population to 144,000, as indicated by a sign at the beginning of the pilot episode. Most of the series was filmed in North Carolina and Georgia, though several aerial shots of the actual village and surrounding region are incorporated into the series.
- The Elsbeth episode "Ick, a Bod" takes place in Sleepy Hollow where Elsbeth Tascione is sent to investigate the beheading of a resident.

Television shot on location in Sleepy Hollow includes:

- The Ramones' music video for the song "Pet Sematary" was shot in Sleepy Hollow Cemetery.
- The "Tale of the Midnight Ride" episode of the Nickelodeon series Are You Afraid of the Dark?
- Retired Olympic decathlete and television personality Caitlyn Jenner, who attended Sleepy Hollow High School, led TV journalist Diane Sawyer on a tour of the village and neighboring Tarrytown during her landmark coming-out interview on 20/20 in 2015.
- An episode of the HGTV series Property Brothers during its Westchester-dedicated season
- The HBO series Divorce starring Sarah Jessica Parker
- The "Two Boats and a Helicopter" episode of the HBO series The Leftovers
- The Amazon Prime Video series Sneaky Pete
- The Hulu series The Path
- An episode of the Travel Channel/Food Channel series Man v. Food
- The Showtime miniseries Escape at Dannemora
- The FX series Pose
- The Netflix revival of the series Tales of the City
- An episode of the CBS series The Blacklist
- An episode of the AMC series TURN: Washington's Spies
- The Netflix series Zero Day starring Robert De Niro
- The Amazon Prime Video reboot of Dexter

== Notable people ==
- Bob Akin (1936–2002), business executive, journalist, television commentator and champion sports car racing driver
- Fay Baker (1917–1987), actress and author
- Kathleen Beller, actress
- David Bromberg, string instrumentalist, vocalist, and band leader
- Ana Cabrera, television journalist
- Clarence Clough Buel (1850–1933), editor and author
- Keith Hamilton Cobb, actor best known for The Young and the Restless
- Sam Coffey, professional soccer player for the Portland Thorns and the United States Women's National Team
- Vincent Desiderio, realist painter
- Karen Finley, performance artist
- John C. Frémont (1813-1890), U.S. Army Major-General, explorer, and politician
- Josh Hammer, political commentator, attorney, and columnist
- Elsie Janis (1889–1956), singer, songwriter, actress, and screenwriter
- Mondaire Jones, former U.S. Representative of NY-17
- Tom Keene (1896–1963), actor best known for King Vidor's film classic Our Daily Bread and Ed Wood's film Plan 9 from Outer Space
- Karl Knortz (1841–1918), German-American author and champion of American literature
- Joseph L. Levesque, former President of Niagara University
- Joan Lorring (1926–2014), Academy Award-nominated actress and singer
- Ted Mack (1904–1976), radio and television host best known for The Original Amateur Hour
- Cyrus Margono, professional soccer player
- Ralph G. Martin (1920–2013), author and journalist
- Donald Moffat (1930–2018), British actor
- Frank Murphy (1876-1912), Major League Baseball player
- Eric Paschall, NBA basketball player
- Adam Savage, co-host of the television show MythBusters
- Gregg L. Semenza, Nobel Prize-awarded physician, researcher, and professor
- Tony Taylor, NBA basketball player

== See also ==
- Historic Hudson Valley
- History of Westchester County, New York
- Pocantico Hills, New York
