= Briarcliff Manor Fire Department =

Village volunteer fire department

Operational area
- Country: United States
- State: New York
- Village: Briarcliff Manor
- Address: 1111 Pleasantville Road; Briarcliff Manor, New York

Agency overview
- Established: 1901

Facilities and equipment
- Stations: 2
- Engines: 3
- Trucks: 1
- Rescues: 1
- Ambulances: 2

Website
- www.bmfd.org

The Briarcliff Manor Fire Department (BMFD) provides fire protection and emergency medical services to the village of Briarcliff Manor, New York and its hamlet Scarborough. The volunteer fire department also serves unincorporated areas of Ossining and Mount Pleasant. (Note: Ossining is under a fire protection contract and pays the BMFD to cover an unincorporated area, including election district 20. Ossining paid $123,000 for BMFD service in 2011.) The fire department has three fire companies, two stations, and four fire engines; it also maintains other vehicles, including a heavy rescue vehicle. The Briarcliff Manor Fire Department Ambulance Corps provides emergency medical transport with two ambulances. The fire department is headquartered at the Briarcliff Manor Village Hall, with its other station being located in Scarborough, on Scarborough Road.

The Briarcliff Steamer Company No. 1 was founded in 1902 by Frederick C. Messinger. He became the first chief of the department, founded February 10, 1903. In 1906, the Briarcliff Fire Company was established. The village's municipal building and first permanent firehouse was built in 1914 in downtown Briarcliff Manor. Seven years later, in 1921, the Scarborough Fire Company was established. From 1930 to 1971, the Archville Fire Department was dissolved into Scarborough's fire company, which expanded its fire protection to Archville. In 1936, the Briarcliff Manor Hook and Ladder Company was formed. In 1963, the Briarcliff Manor Village Hall was constructed, again housing the fire and police departments. In 1974, a replacement firehouse was built for the Scarborough Engine Company, and in 2010, Scarborough's firehouse was again replaced, doubling its size.

== Organization ==
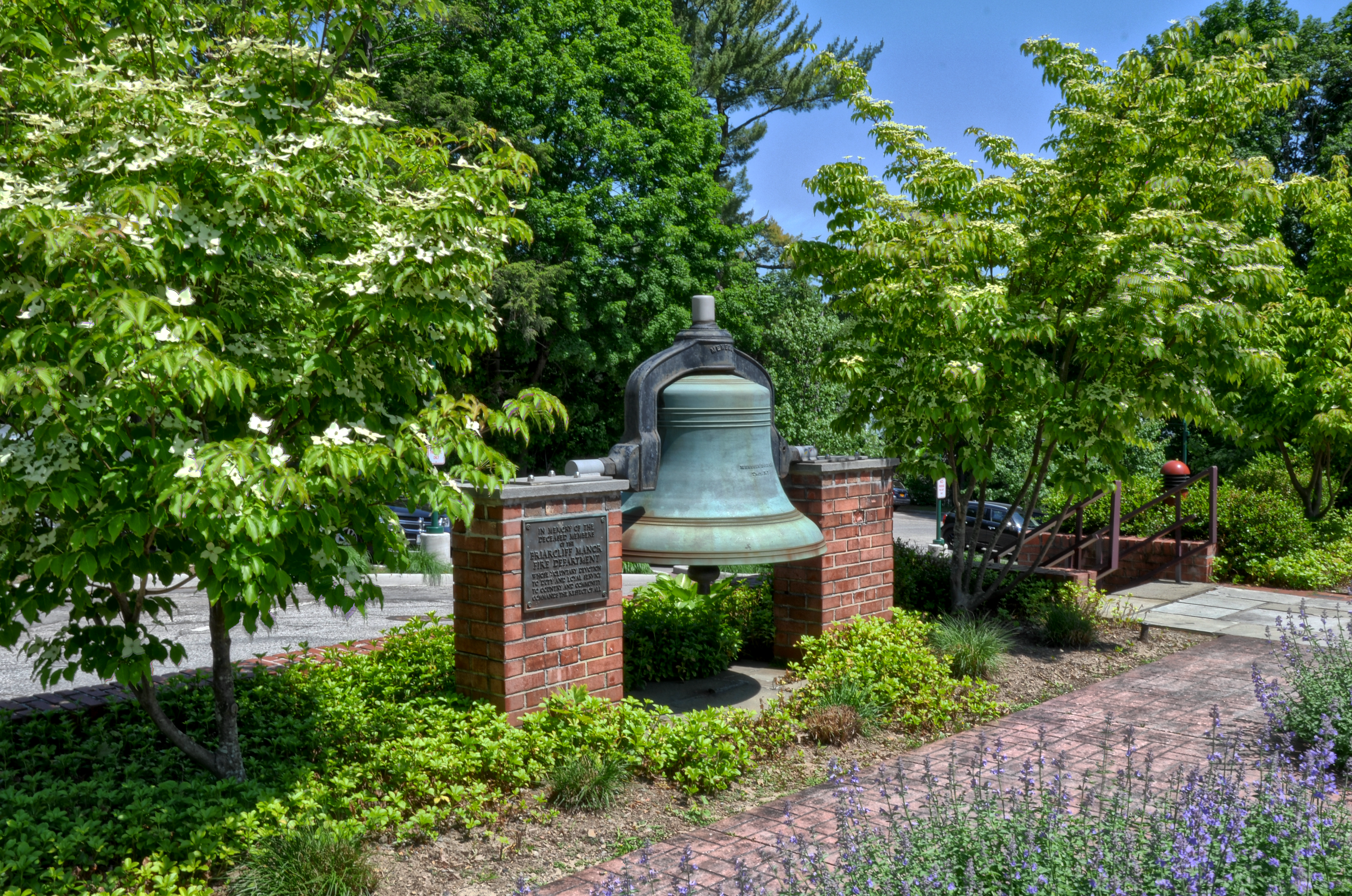
The fire bell from the municipal building is now a memorial bell in front of the new fire station

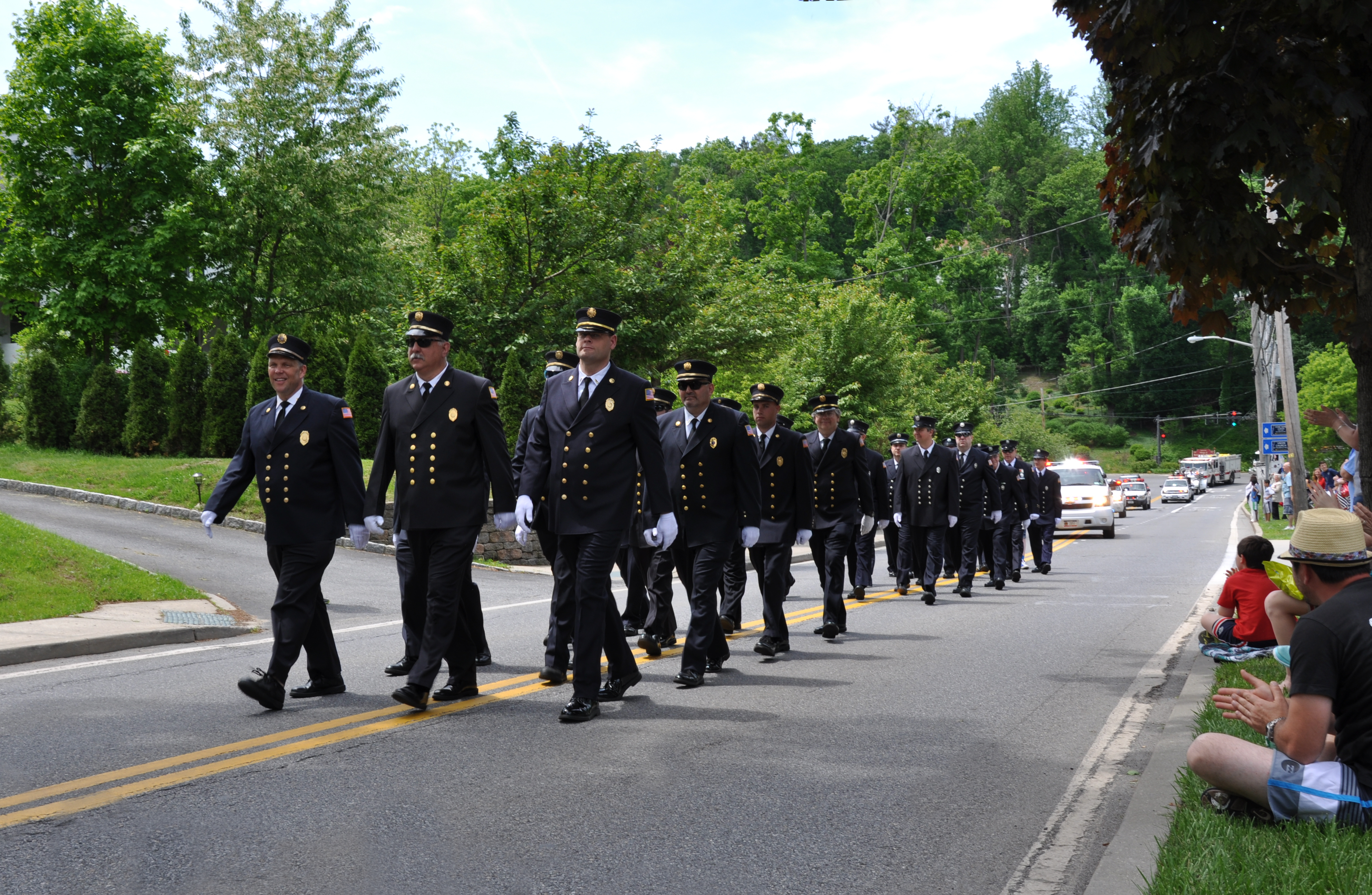
Department members and engines at Briarcliff Manor's Memorial Day parade

Operationally, the department is nominally organized into three fire companies, each led by a chief:

- Briarcliff Fire Company
- Briarcliff Manor Hook & Ladder Company
- Scarborough Engine Company

The fire department has two stations; its headquarters at the Briarcliff Manor Village Hall (housing the Briarcliff fire companies) and another on Scarborough Road (housing the Scarborough Engine Company). The department has approximately 150 members, including a fire chief and two assistant chiefs who are paid nominally and are not village employees. The department's fire district protects about 8,000 residents, and spans 5 square miles (13 km^{2}) within Briarcliff Manor and unincorporated portions of the towns of Ossining and Mount Pleasant.

=== Ambulance corps ===
The Briarcliff Manor Fire Department Ambulance Corps operates two state-certified ambulances with basic life-support capabilities. The corps answers over 500 emergencies per year and participates in the Tri-Community Fly Car Program to provide advanced life support.

== History ==
=== 1900s to 1920s ===
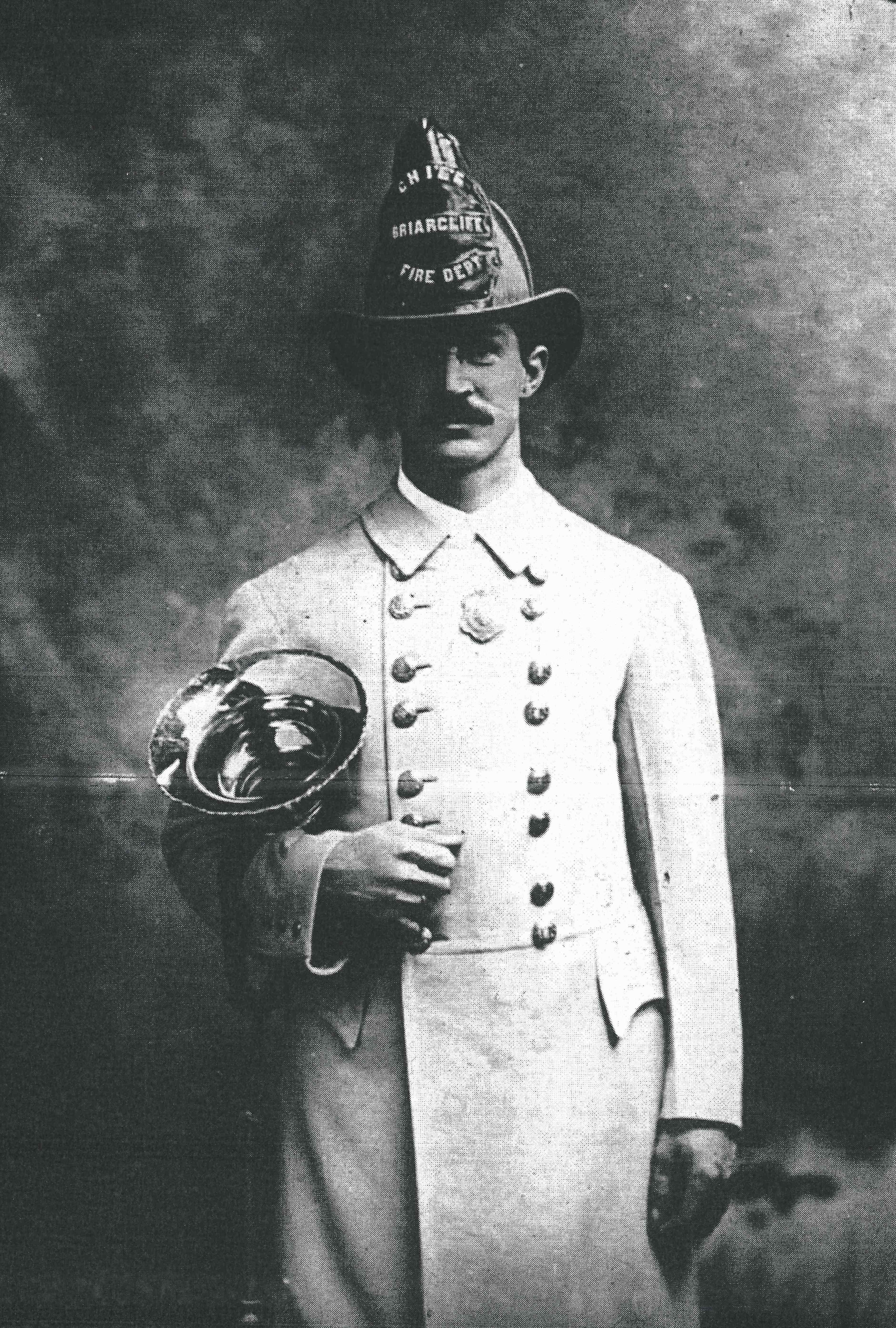
Frederick Messinger, founder

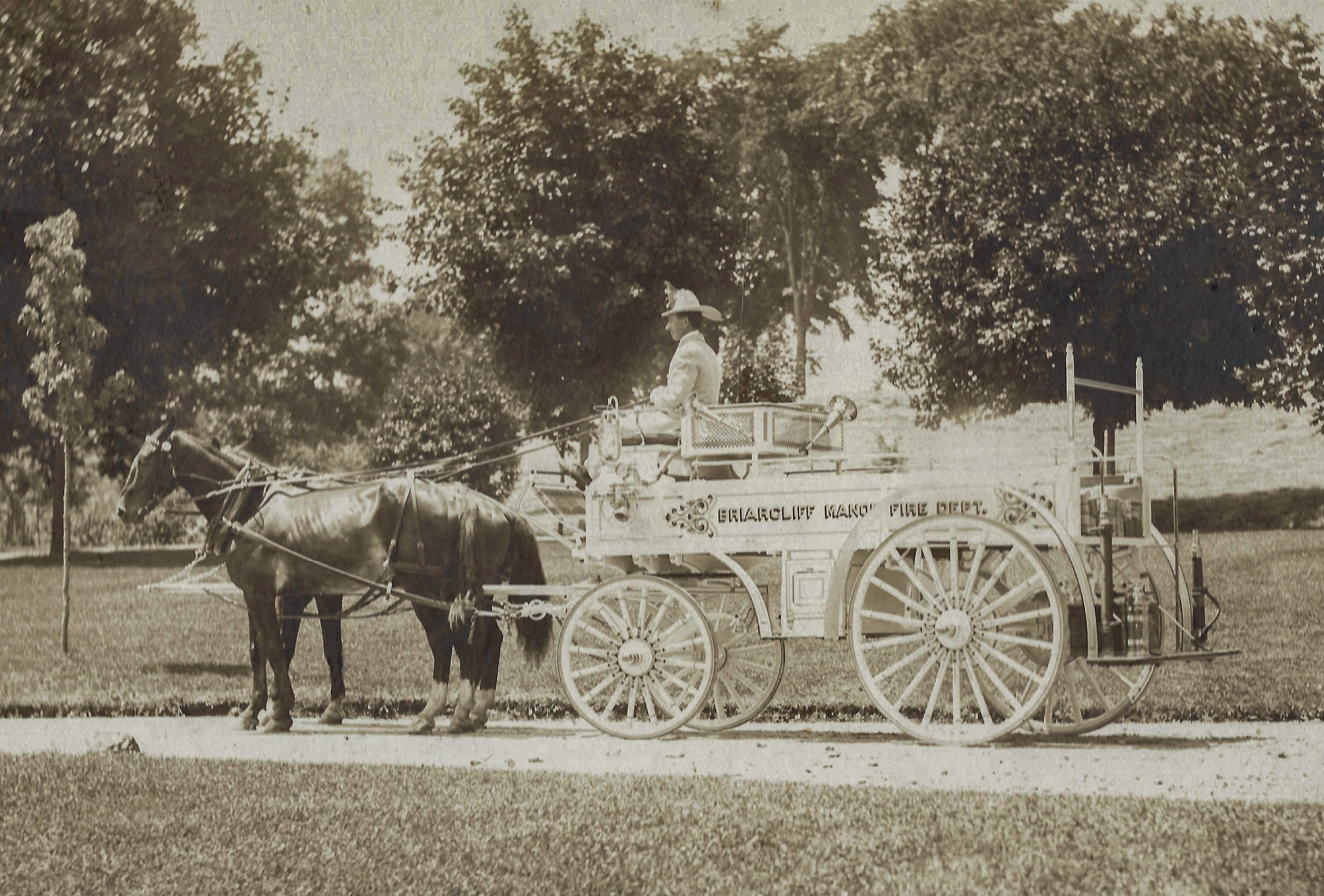
The department's first fire engine, 1905

Frederick C. Messinger (a fireman in Kingston for ten years) and thirteen local men founded the private fire company in 1901, a year before the village was incorporated. Thirty-six men became the company's charter members on March 4, 1902, and the company was renamed Briarcliff Steamer Company No. 1 the next month. The company's first equipment was a 1901 hand-drawn chemical apparatus, with a tank containing a mixture of water and sodium bicarbonate; during a fire, sulfuric acid was added to propel the solution through the hose. The first apparatus was white, which Messinger thought more visible than the conventional red in a village without street lights; (Note: The first 29 street lights, all electric, were installed in 1904.) the village's engines continue to be painted white. The chemical apparatus, which was only suitable for small fires, was supplemented in 1902 with a steam-operated pumper and a hose wagon, both horse-drawn. Walter Law's Briarcliff Realty Company owned the equipment and loaned them to the fire company without charge. At the time, the fire company housed its equipment and horses at the Briarcliff Farms' Barn A (present-day St. Theresa's School) and used the Wheelwright shop as a meeting room and for social events.

After the village was incorporated, the company petitioned the village board to form the company into a village fire department. Their request was granted on February 10, 1903. The village counsel advised reorganization in 1906, and the Briarcliff Fire Company was created, with Messinger again serving as Foreman; the equipment was transferred to the new company. In 1908, American LaFrance sold two horse-drawn vehicles to the department: a hook-and-ladder truck and a two-wheeled hose-and-chemical truck. In the following year an alarm bell was purchased, replacing first a suspended railway iron and sledgehammer in a barn, which was followed by an ineffective steam whistle.

The Archville Fire Company had been formed in neighboring Archville, New York, in 1909 as the Archville Fire Department. The Archville department was autonomous, until 1930, when, despite the lack of a formal agreement, the department changed its name to the Scarborough Fire Company and became part of the Briarcliff Manor Fire Department. In 1972, the company was split into two units, with an autonomous Archville unit and the Scarborough Engine Company, headquartered in the Scarborough Presbyterian Church garage and a part of the Briarcliff Manor Fire Department.

After a large fire at Miss Knox's School in 1912, the village purchased its first motorized vehicle, an American LaFrance pumper truck. The existing hose-and-chemical wagon was motorized and became the chief's car. In 1914, the Briarcliff Manor Municipal Building was constructed to house the government and fire engines, and the department established sub-stations, which were discontinued in 1921. The first major fire to involve the motorized vehicles was in 1916. The hook-and-ladder truck was motorized in 1923 and two years later, the chief's car was replaced. An electric siren was installed in 1928 after a complaint that the previous alarm sounded more like a call to breakfast than an alarm of fire. In 1928, another downtown fire caused $150,000 in damages to multiple buildings.

The village's former municipal building, 2015

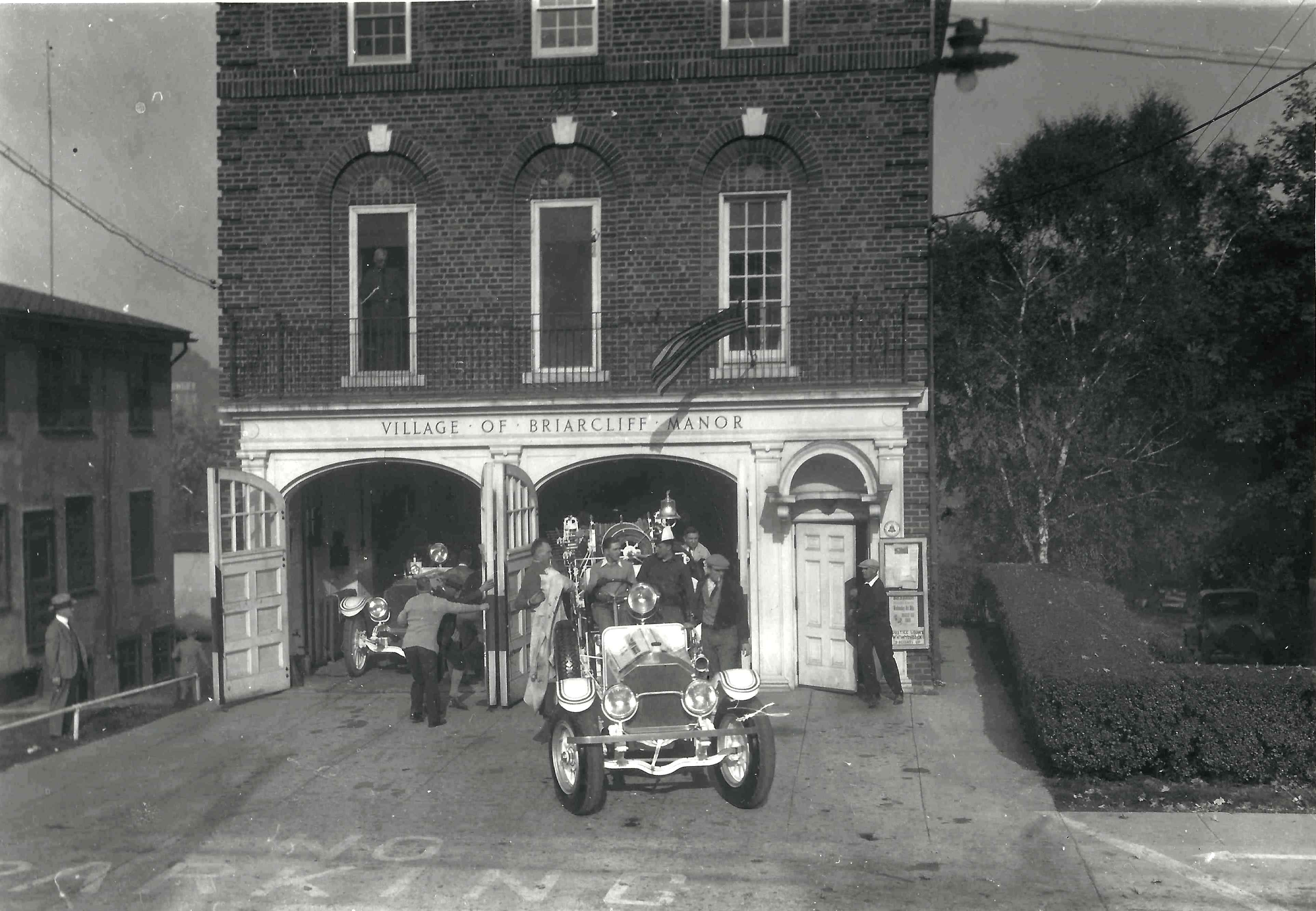
Fire department at the village municipal building, c. 1930

=== 1930s to 1960s ===
During the Great Depression, uniforms were again nonstandard, similar to the early years of the fire department. Another American LaFrance hook-and-ladder truck was ordered in 1930, and another pump truck was purchased from the same company in 1935. Five years later, the pumper truck was sold was replaced with a Mack squad and patrol truck. In 1936, due to a dispute over fire chief elections, the Briarcliff Manor Hook and Ladder Company was formed, separate from the Engine Company. The department ordered a Mack squad and patrol truck in 1939. The Hook and Ladder Company waived fees and dues for those enlisted from 1941 onward. During World War II, a large enough proportion of firefighters was serving in the armed forces that the village requested volunteers ages 16–18 to join the Briarcliff Manor Fire Department; at least nine served on active duty. The department received a trailer-type pump unit in 1944; it was loaned to the village by the Office of Civil Defense and was an auxiliary to the existing equipment.

After a number of residents expressed the need for an ambulance, the department ordered its first ambulance in July 1945. The ambulance was delivered in 1947 and provided for two bed patients and two stretcher cases. Ossining later purchased the ambulance to start their own ambulance corps. The village purchased all loaned fire equipment in 1946 and purchased a new Mack pumper truck in May 1947.

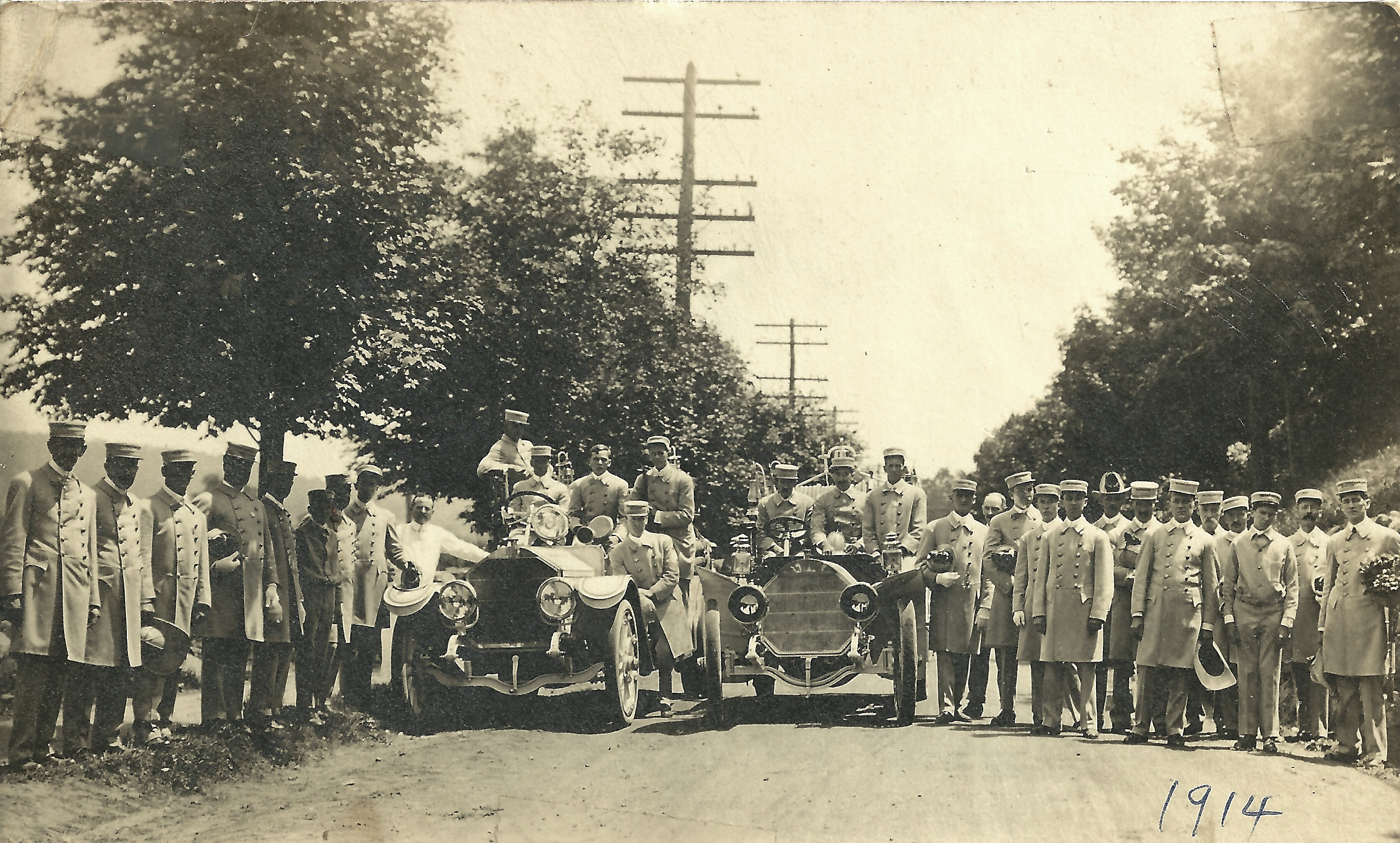
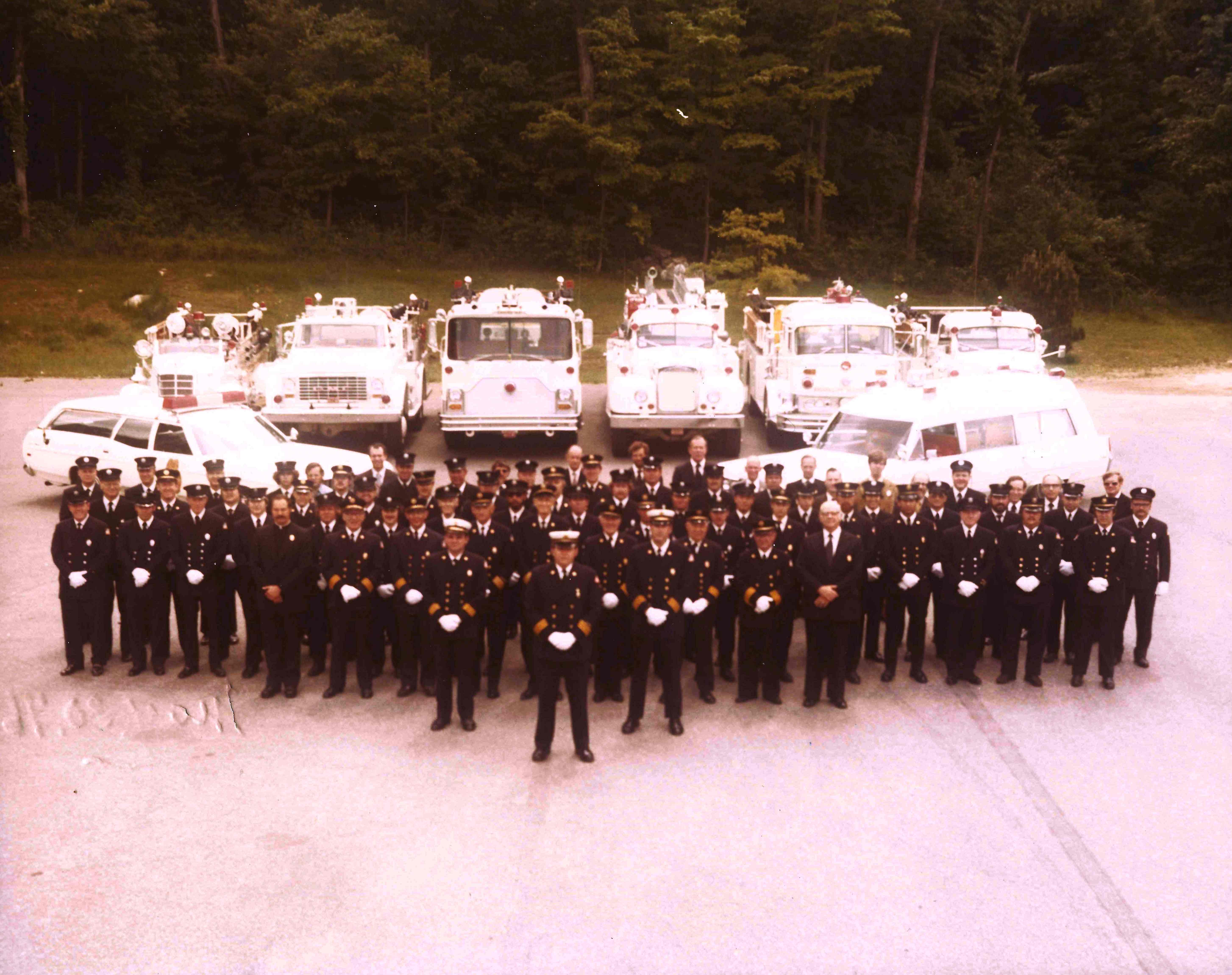
BMFD members and vehicles on July 4, 1914 and May 30, 1976

To celebrate the 50th anniversary of the fire department, the village held a week-long celebration beginning on July 1, 1950. No residents died from a fire within village boundaries until Edna O'Brien in the late 1950s. In 1955, the department purchased a new pumper and a Mack hook-and-ladder truck. The weight of the pumper and ladder trucks ruptured the municipal building's floor, and they were housed in Briarcliff and Ossining garages for five years until the new firehouse and municipal offices building was completed in late 1963. Additional sirens were installed for firemen outside of the central siren's range in the 1950s. During the 1960s the old municipal building's cupola bell, which the department used as a fire bell and which had tolled at the end of the World Wars, was moved to the front of the new firehouse.

=== 1970s to present ===
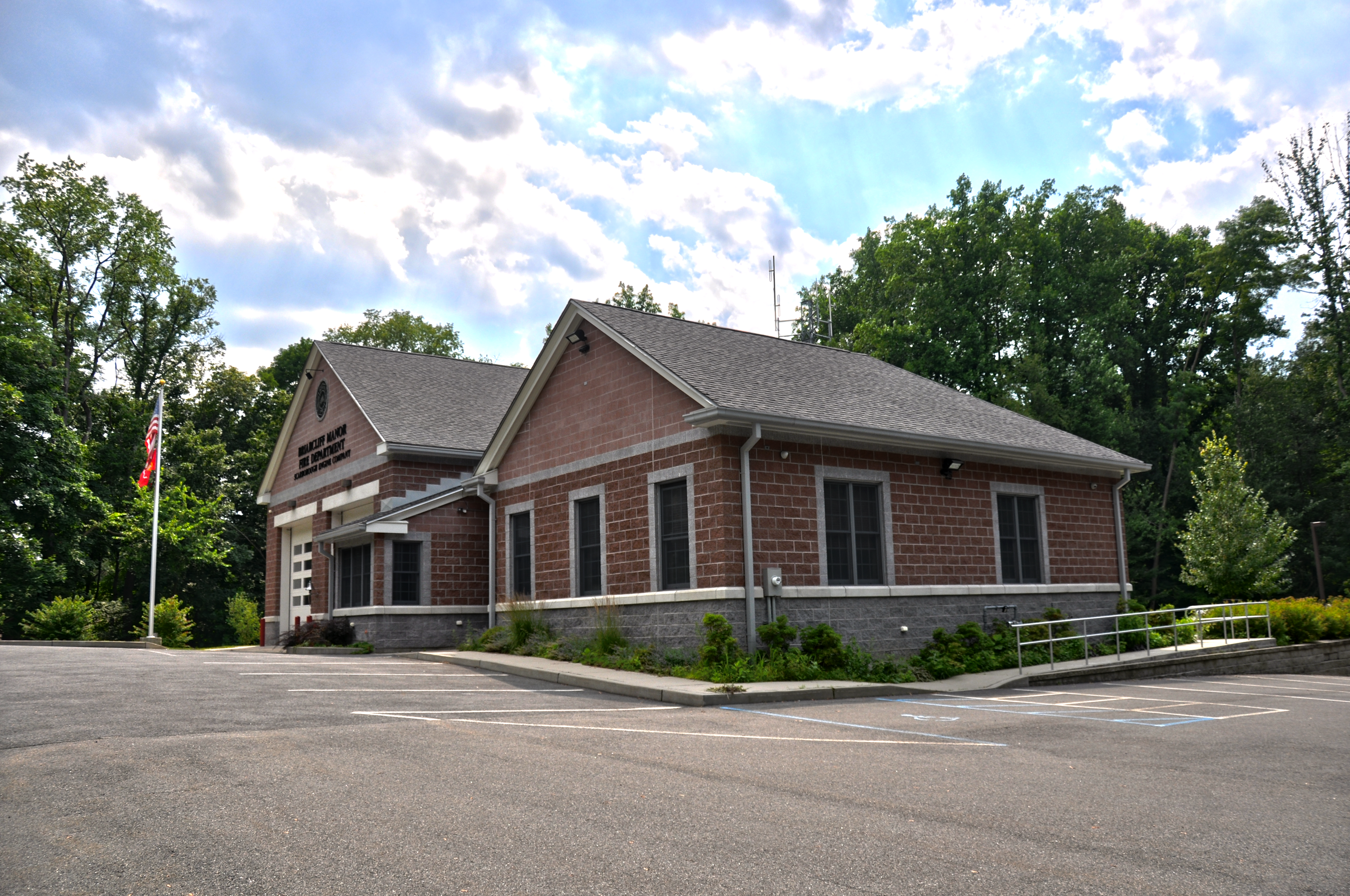
Scarborough Engine Company station, built 2009

Around 1971, the Archville-based Scarborough Fire Company stopped responding to Briarcliff fire alarm calls and resisted taking required training courses. Additionally in 1971, Briarcliff's government tried to charge Archville $200 per year ($1,600 per year in 2025) for the four existing hydrants and water supply in the hamlet, to which Archville objected. Following a dispute, the Briarcliff Board of Trustees terminated the Scarborough Fire Company's membership in the Briarcliff Manor Fire Department and stopped serving Archville. In September 1972, the Briarcliff Manor Board of Trustees formed the Scarborough Engine Company, which purchased a Mack pumper in 1974. In 1974, the company moved from the church garage to a new $110,725 brick firehouse on Scarborough Road, designed by Pellaton and Chapman. The village government funded the firehouse; members purchased and constructed the furnishings.

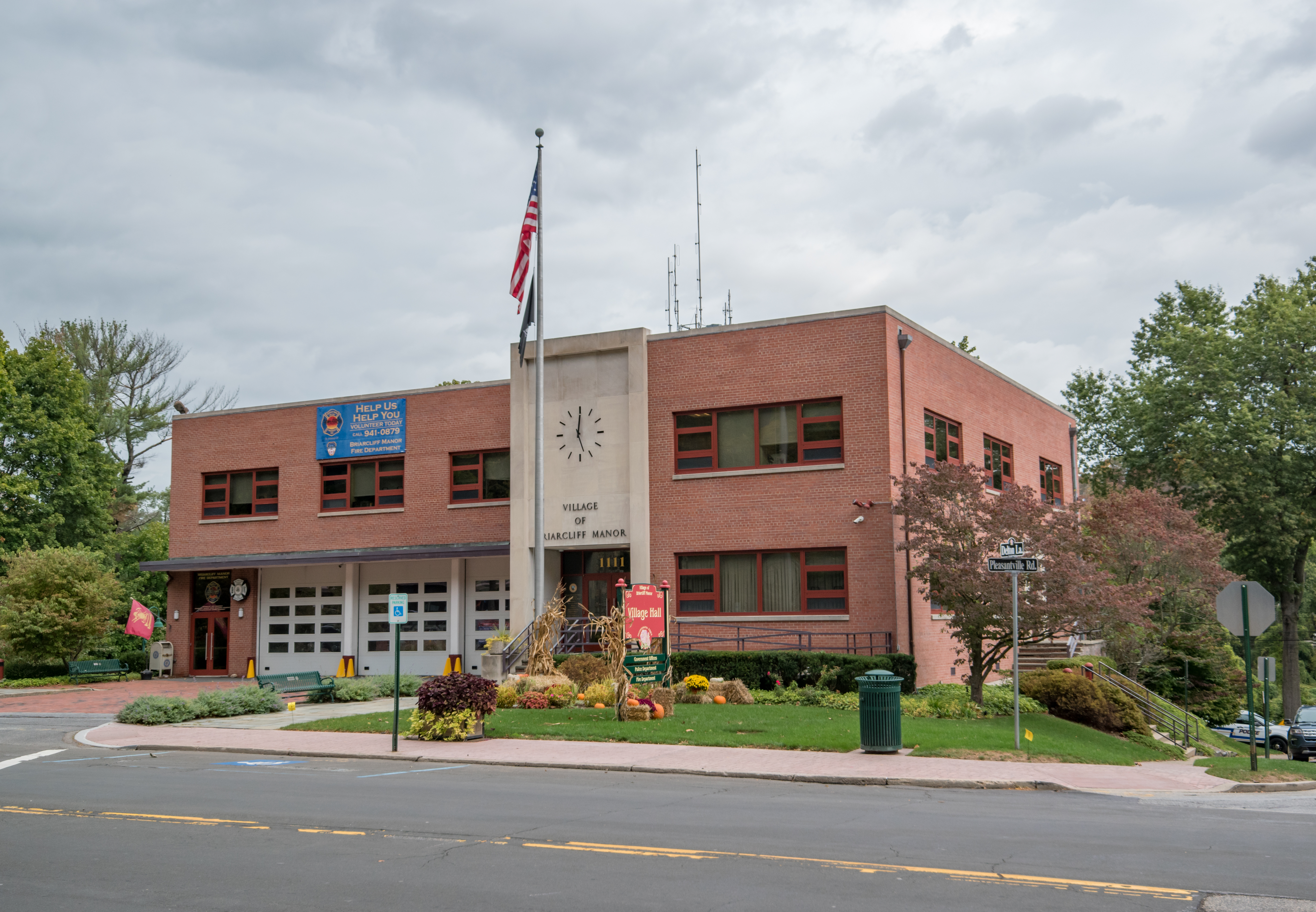
Primary station at the Briarcliff Manor Village Hall

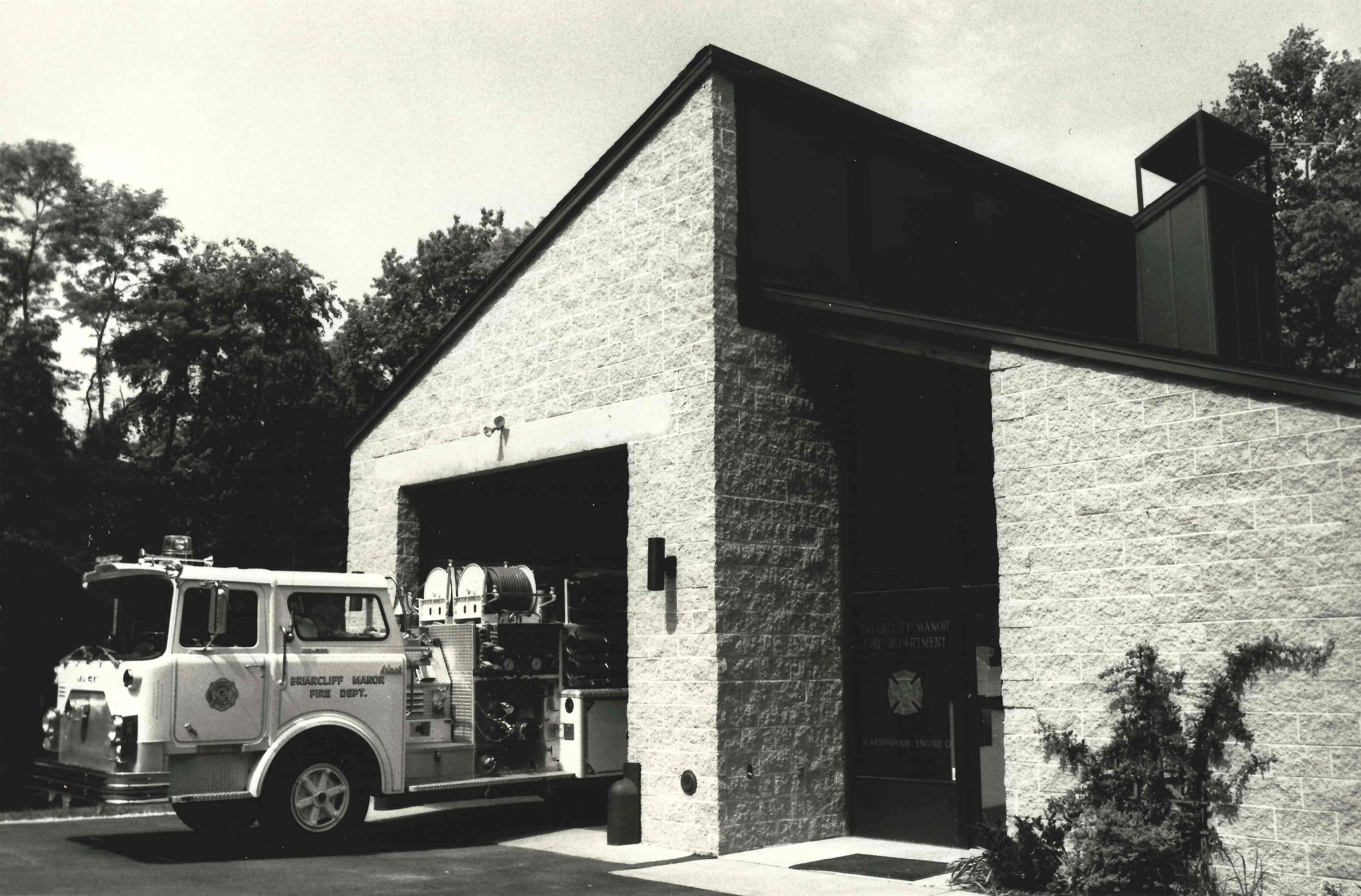
Scarborough Engine Company station, stood 1974 to 2009

In 1978, a new ambulance was purchased; the old ambulance was kept as an auxiliary. A year later, the village purchased a new ladder truck, delivered in 1983. One of the most notable fires in the village happened at about 10 pm on January 22, 1982, in the village central business district, when a fire caused $500,000 ($1,668,100 today) in damage. Also in 1982, the first Briarcliff Manor fire with active female volunteers was fought. The number of women in the department increased to 15 by 2002, out of a total force of 80.

In 1996, the department ordered a rescue truck from 3-D Manufacturing, and a pumper truck from Pierce Manufacturing. A year later, the department hosted the Westchester County Volunteer Firemen Association Convention, the usual parade with 43 departments, a golf outing, and the annual meeting and dinner of the Association. During the September 11 attacks in 2001, the department sent some of its engines to the Bronx to cover for units that had left for the World Trade Center. Ten volunteers joined the fire department in the six months after the attacks; the department usually had five new members per year prior to the attacks. On September 20, 2003, the original wing of the Briarcliff Lodge caught fire after its owner tried to redevelop the lodge amid opposition from local historians and architects. The fire was deemed suspicious by fire officials, though Westchester County's Cause & Origin Team found no evidence of arson. Contemporary portions of the lodge and other campus buildings were later demolished.

On October 1, 2010, the department dedicated the Scarborough firehouse, which was rebuilt in one year at a cost of $1.3 million. The new building reused the old foundation and was expanded from 1,650 square feet (153 m^{2}) to 3,603 square feet (334.7 m^{2}). Upgrades included a second bay, a meeting room, 14-foot-high garage ceilings, and expanded parking.

In 2015, the department traded in its 1999 ambulance for a monetary deduction to a company in Holbrook, New York, while purchasing a new ambulance. In 2016, the department retired its 1991 pumper and purchased a Seagrave Marauder II. The new pumper was acquired through a Federal Emergency Management Agency grant, while the old pumper was donated to the New York Guard.

In 2018, the department's chief Michael Garcia, who had resigned the previous year, was convicted of embezzlement of $120,000 of department funds; the village had lost $800,000 as a result of the embezzlement. A finance committee was created to oversee future department finances. Until 2021, the fire department was required to source 55 percent of its volunteers from within municipal boundaries. Due to the village's small size and its stations' proximity to other municipalities, and amid difficulty recruiting volunteers for the department, a state law was passed exempting the fire department from the membership requirement.

== Current apparatus ==
The central siren is located at the Briarcliff Manor Village Hall. Since the 1950s, additional sirens have been located on Schrade Road and at the intersection of Long Hill and Scarborough roads.

The Briarcliff Manor Fire Department has several vehicles:

Ident. Number	Type	Make/Model	Location	SCBA	Picture	Company
92	Class-A pumper	2019 Pierce Enforcer; 1500/500 Pumper/Rescue	Scarborough; Fire Station	7	Upload image	Scarborough Engine; Company
93	Class-A pumper	2016 Seagrave model TB7OCS; Marauder II 2000/1000 "The Beast"	Briarcliff Manor; Village Hall	TBA	A white firetruck	Briarcliff Fire Company
94	Class-A pumper	2008 Seagrave Marauder II; 2000/500 "The Bus"	Briarcliff Manor; Village Hall	9	A white firetruck	Briarcliff Fire Company
Tower Ladder 40	Tower ladder	2005 KME Predator/Aerialcat (95FT MM)	Briarcliff Manor; Village Hall	8	A white firetruck	Briarcliff Manor Hook & Ladder Company

Ident. Number	Type	Make/Model	Location	SCBA	Picture
Rescue 37	Heavy rescue vehicle	2022 Spartan Metro Star "The Box"	Briarcliff Manor; Village Hall		Upload image
53-B-1	Ambulance	2007 Ford E-450/PL Custom	Briarcliff Manor; Village Hall	N/A	A white ambulance
53-B-2	Ambulance	2015 Chevrolet/Horton	Briarcliff Manor; Village Hall	N/A	A white ambulance
Patrol 16	Department antique	1940 Mack Type 50 250/250	Scarborough; Fire Station	N/A	A white 1940s firetruck

== Notable people ==
Santa's Express, an annual tradition for a Santa-suited firefighter to visit Briarcliff Manor families

- Novelist John Cheever lived in Scarborough, and served in the fire department.
- Children's author C. B. Colby lived on Pine Road and served as chief of the hook and ladder company, as the village's fire commissioner, and as village trustee.
- Ely Jacques Kahn, Jr., a writer for The New Yorker, lived in Scarborough for more than 20 years, and was a member of the department.
- Architect Don Reiman was also a member of the department.
