= Archville, New York =

- Hamlet
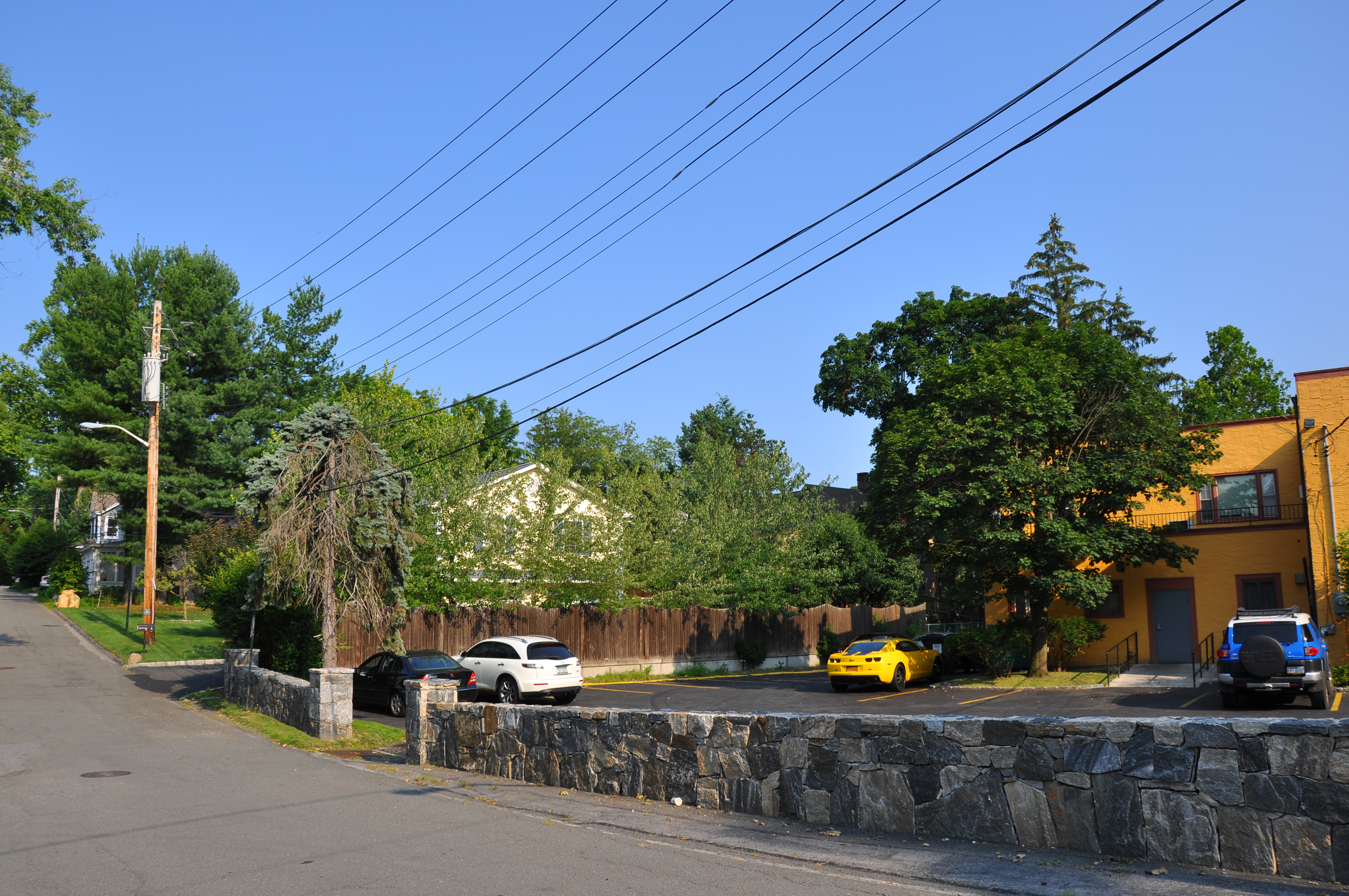
- Union Street, the northernmost of Archville's streets

- Location of Archville in New York
- Coordinates: 41°07′15.1″N 73°51′37.4″W
- Country: United States
- State: New York
- County: Westchester
- Town: Mount Pleasant
- Time zone: UTC-5 (Eastern (EST))
  - Summer (DST): UTC-4 (EDT)
- ZIP code: 10510
- Area code: 914
- GNIS feature ID: 942540

Archville is a hamlet in the town of Mount Pleasant in Westchester County, New York, United States. The hamlet consists of residences, businesses, and a fire station on Union Street, Arch Hill, and Requa Street, all abutting U.S. Route 9. Directly across Route 9 lies Rockwood Hall, part of the Rockefeller State Park Preserve. The volunteer Archville Fire Department serves the hamlet and surrounding area, from the Hudson River to Pocantico Lake and from the edge of Briarcliff Manor to the edge of Sleepy Hollow.

== History ==
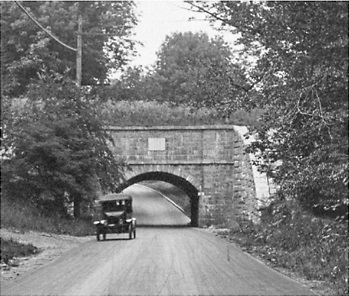
The original arched bridge over US Route 9 near the eponymous hamlet (July 1920)

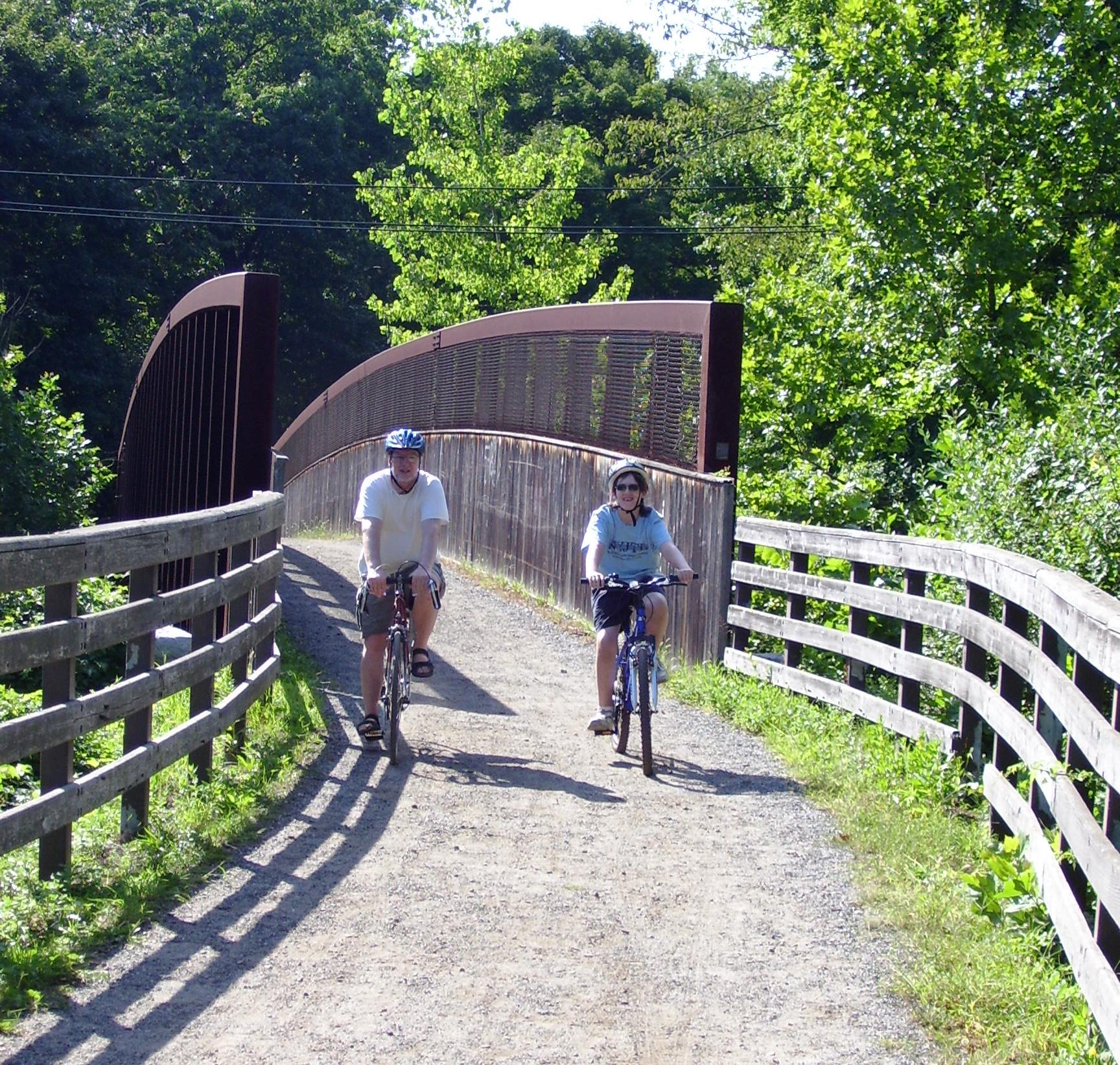
Current Route 9 bridge

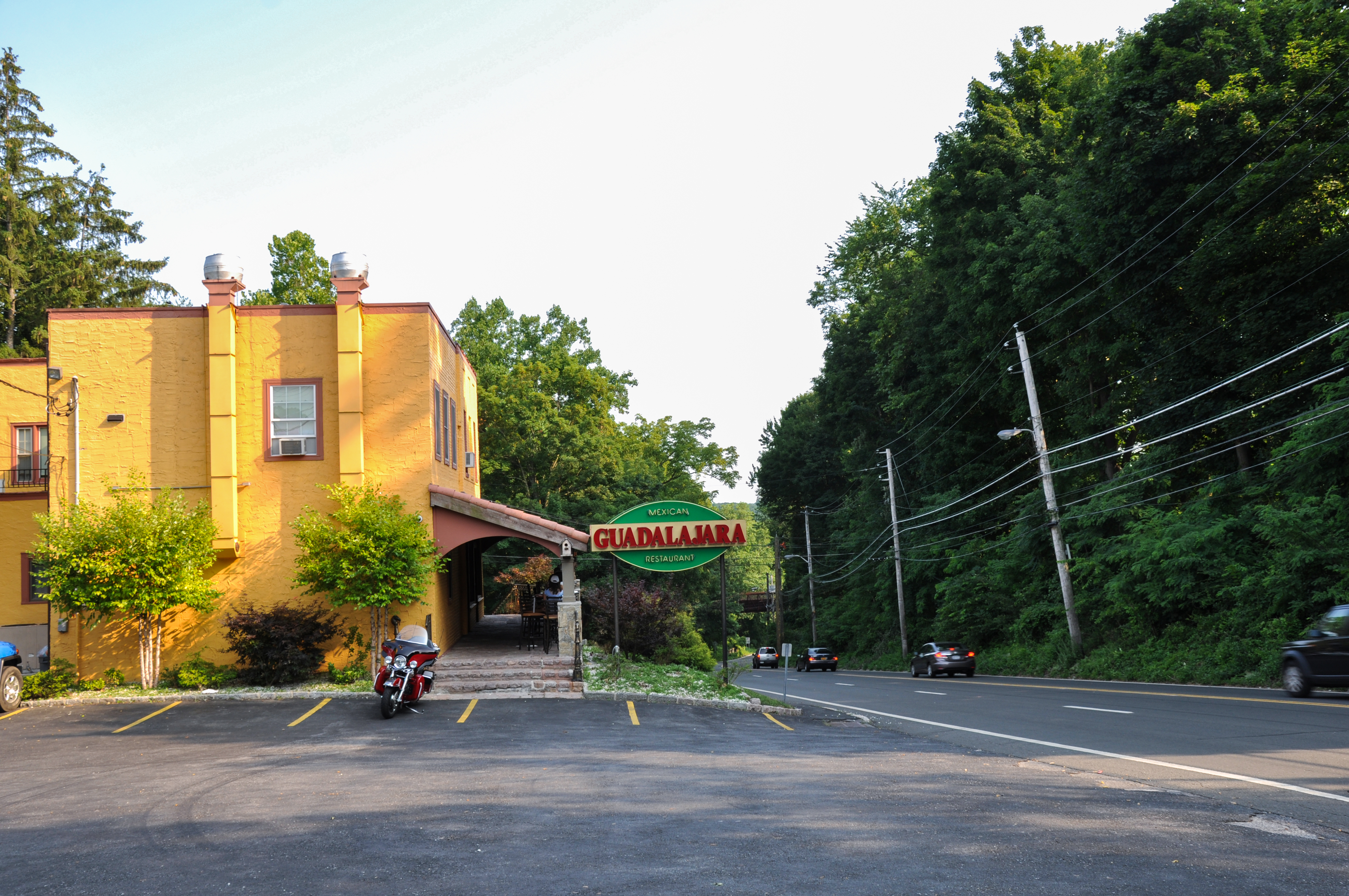
The only commercial operation in the hamlet. In the background is the replacement bridge.

The community received its first name, Arch Hill, after an arched bridge was built over the present-day U.S. Route 9 in 1839. The bridge carried the Old Croton Aqueduct over the highway until 1924, when the bridge was deemed to be a traffic hazard and was demolished. The aqueduct was then rerouted to flow beneath the highway. In November 1998, long after the aqueduct was shut down, the bridge was replaced as a crossing for aqueduct walkers, bikers, and equestrians over the particularly dangerous section of the highway. The new bridge connects the Rockefeller State Park Preserve with Rockwood Hall, and was built to resemble the two bridges over Route 117 which the Rockefellers had built.

In 1839, when Saint Mary's Episcopal Church in Briarcliff was founded, many of the first parishioners lived in Archville, which was at the time a community of laborers building the Croton Aqueduct.

== Fire department ==
Archville Fire Department has three chief's cars, two fire engines, and a horse-drawn hand pumper from 1890, which serves as a department antique.

The Archville Fire Company was established in 1907. At the time, residents (including Saint Mary's rector Oakley Baldwin) constructed the first firehouse: a 20-foot tower and shed on the corner of Route 9 and Union St. The first equipment purchased was 30 fourteen-quart galvanized buckets. After a petition to Mount Pleasant's town board, the Archville Fire Department was chartered on November 11, 1909 with Hubert W. Mannerly as the first chief. Donations from neighbors including Frank A. Vanderlip funded a new firehouse on Requa St., and fundraising allowed the department to purchase a used 50-gallon hand-operated and horse-drawn pumper purchased from the Valhalla Fire Department. It was delivered in 1911.

In 1930, after Briarcliff Manor requested that Archville provide fire protection for Briarcliff's hamlet of Scarborough, the Archville department merged with the Briarcliff Manor Fire Department (BMFD) and was called the Scarborough Fire Company. In 1966, the Mt. Pleasant Fire District built the current firehouse at Union St. and Route 9, designed by local architect Don Reiman. They also purchased a new pumper, replacing Archville's Diamond T engine and making obsolete the company's second truck, owned by Briarcliff and housed at the Scarborough Presbyterian Church's garage.

Around 1971, the Archville-based Scarborough Fire Company stopped responding to Briarcliff fire alarm calls and resisted taking required training courses. Additionally in 1971, Briarcliff's government tried to charge Archville $200 per year ($1,600 per year in 2025) for the four existing hydrants and water supply in the hamlet, which Archville reacted in objection to. Briarcliff Manor contacted the State Controller, who instructed the village that Briarcliff Manor's existing arrangement was not in accordance with any state law. Archville's fire protection district refused to lease the station and equipment from Briarcliff, and thus in 1972 the Briarcliff Board of Trustees terminated the Scarborough Fire Company’s membership in the Briarcliff Manor Fire Department, severed its protection responsibility over Archville, and formed the Scarborough Engine Company with a new truck and firehouse. The Archville Fire Department was reestablished in 1972. Members of the former Scarborough Fire Company could choose to join either department; most Briarcliff Manor members joined the BMFD.

=== Gallery ===
Requa St. firehouse

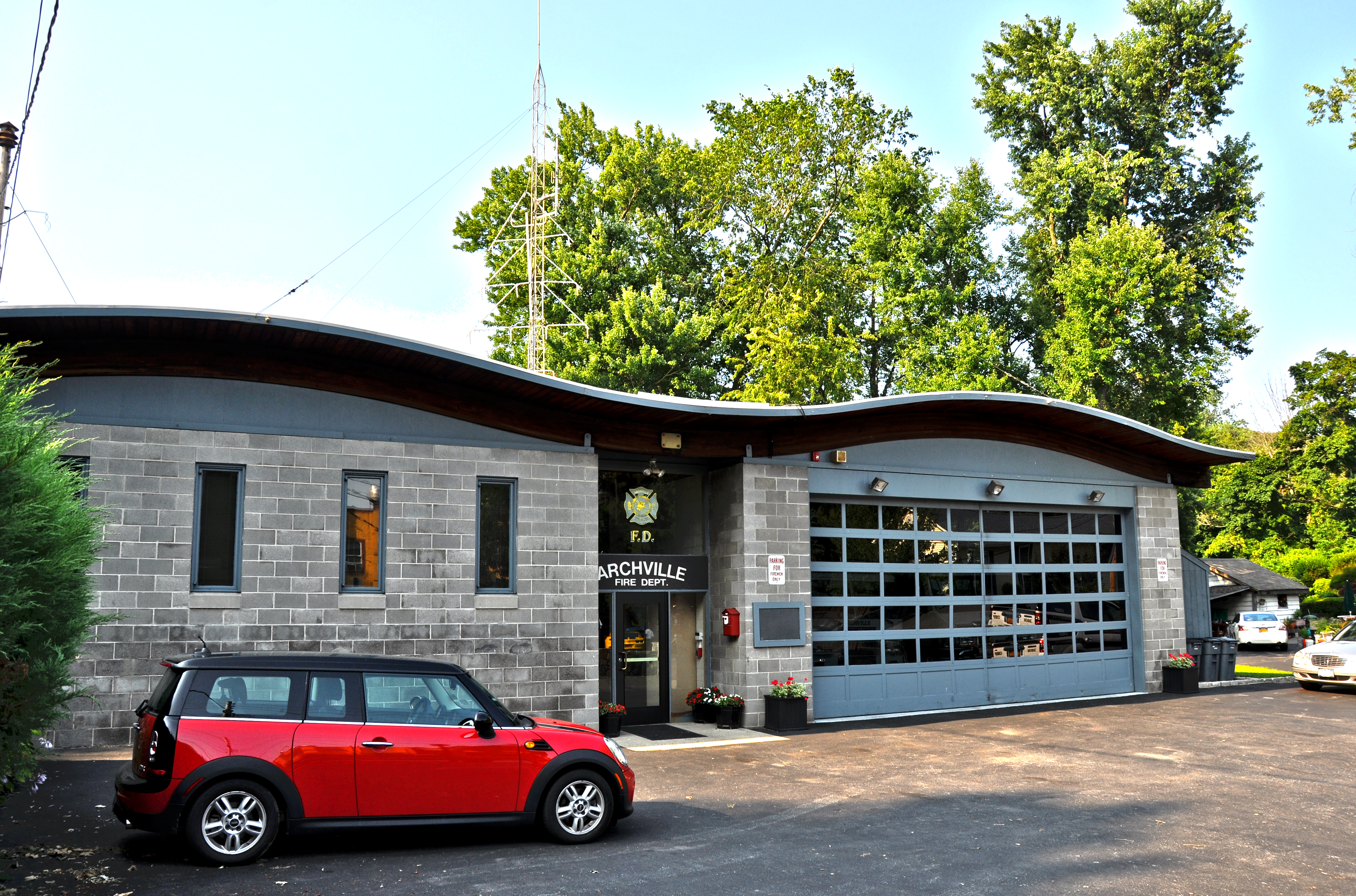
Current firehouse

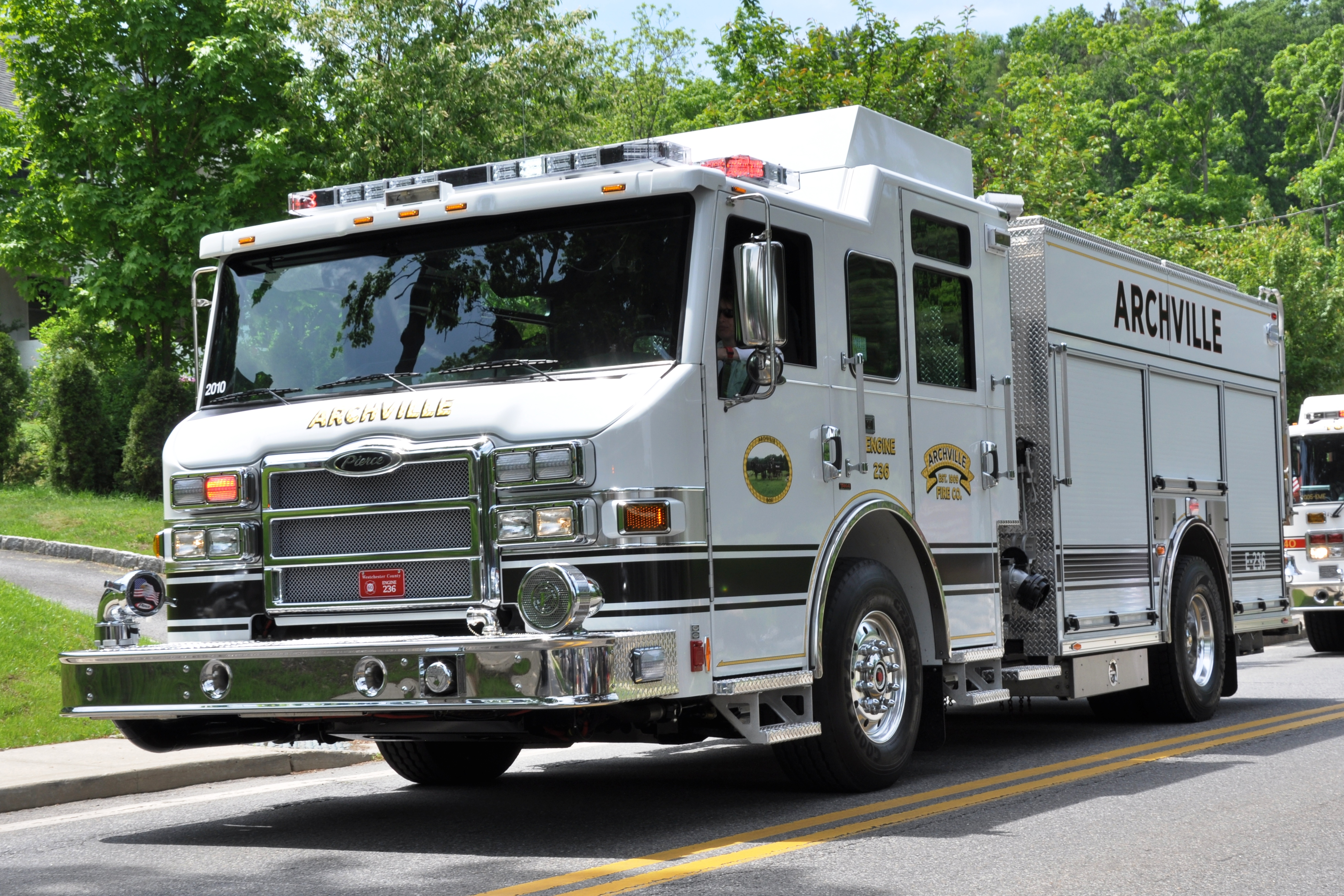
Engine 236, a 2010 Pierce Velocity PUC 1500/1000

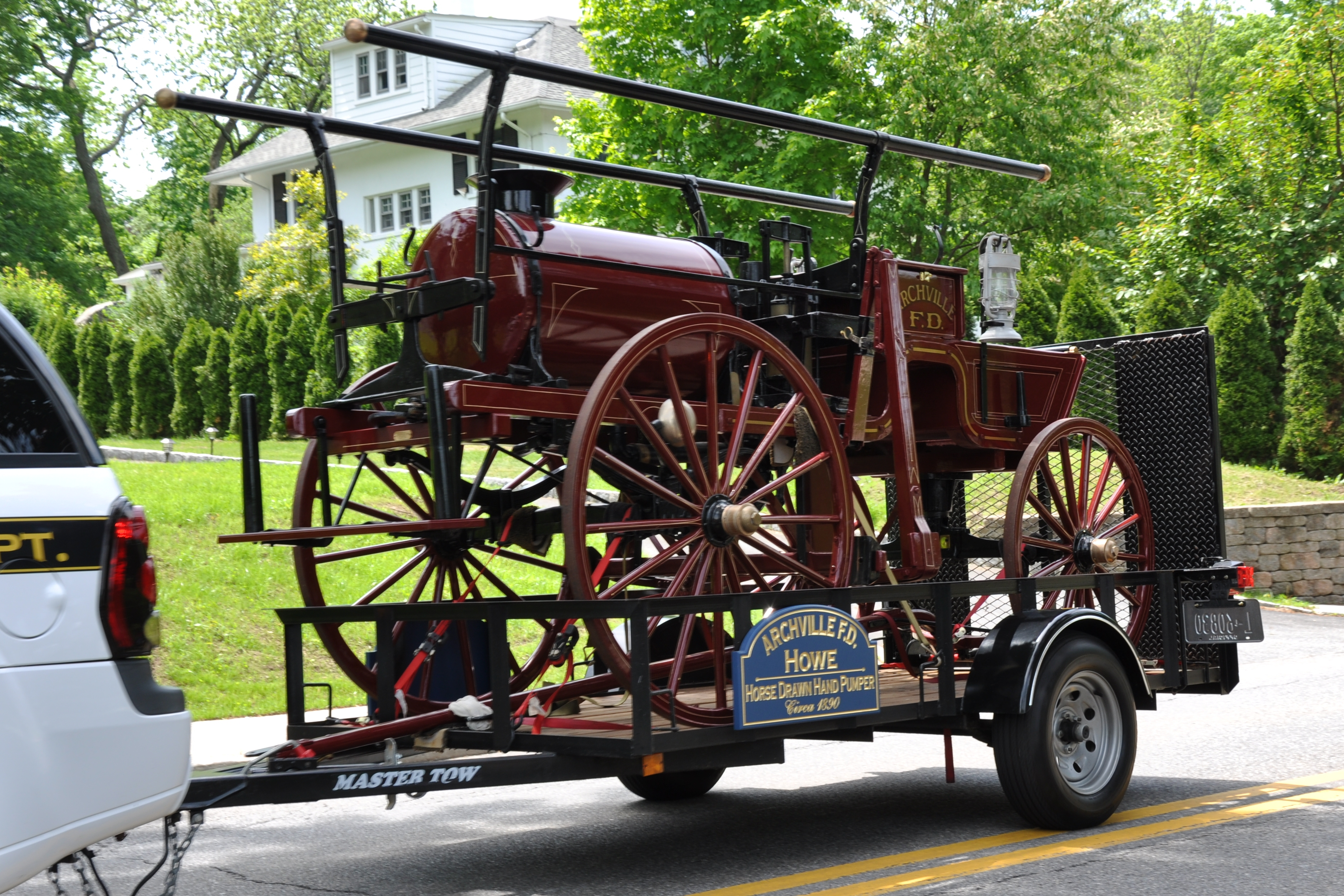
The department antique, from around 1890
