= Pierce Manufacturing =

American manufacturer of fire trucks

Pierce Manufacturing, Inc.
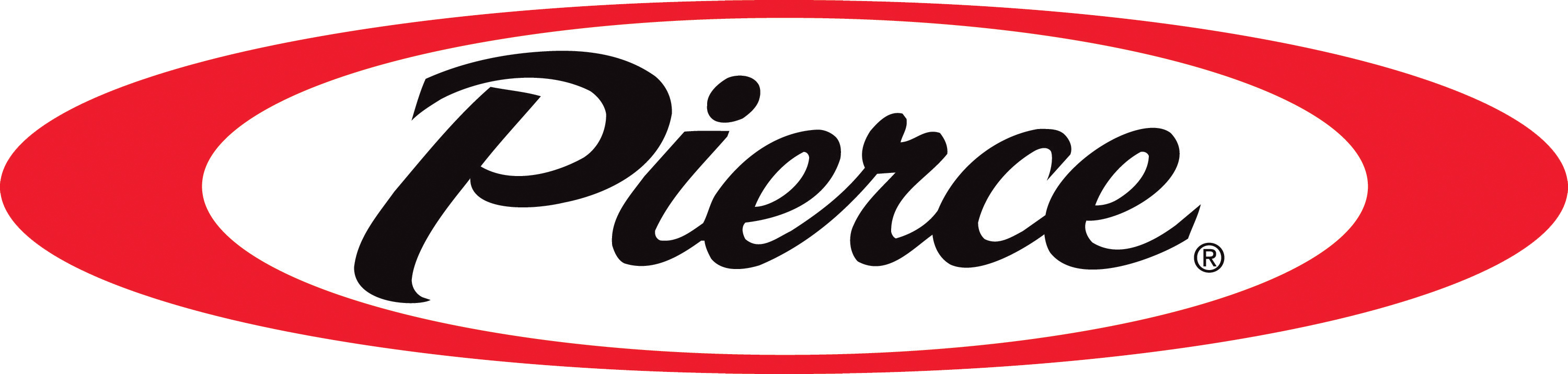

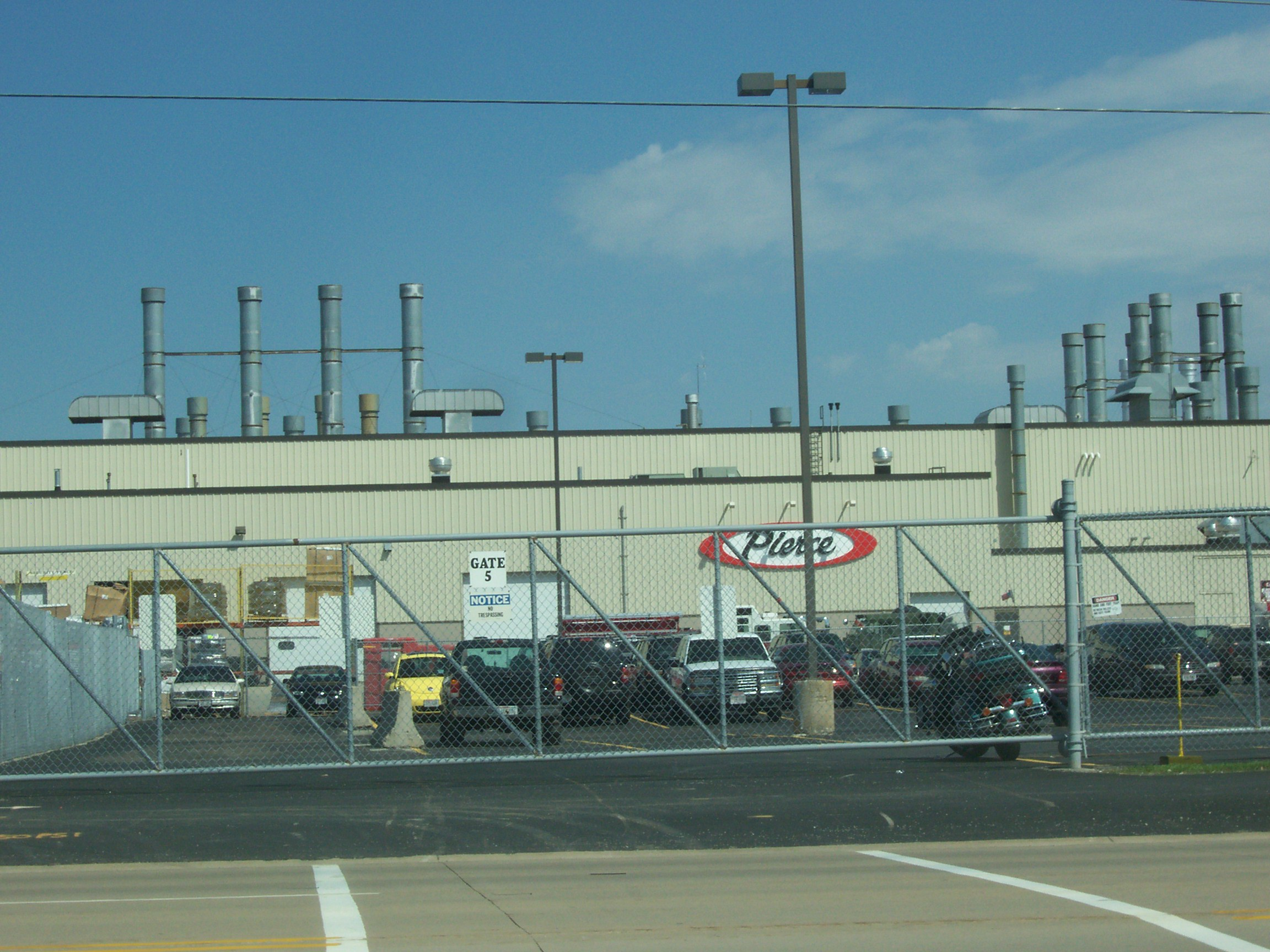
- Pierce factory
- Type: Subsidiary
- Industry: Trucks & Other Vehicles
- Founded: 1913; 113 years ago
- Headquarters: Appleton, Wisconsin, U.S.
- Key people: Robert Schulz II, President; Mike Pack, CFO
- Products: Fire and Rescue Vehicles
- Revenue: ▲US$1 billion (2016)
- Number of employees: 2600
- Parent: Oshkosh
- Website: www.piercemfg.com

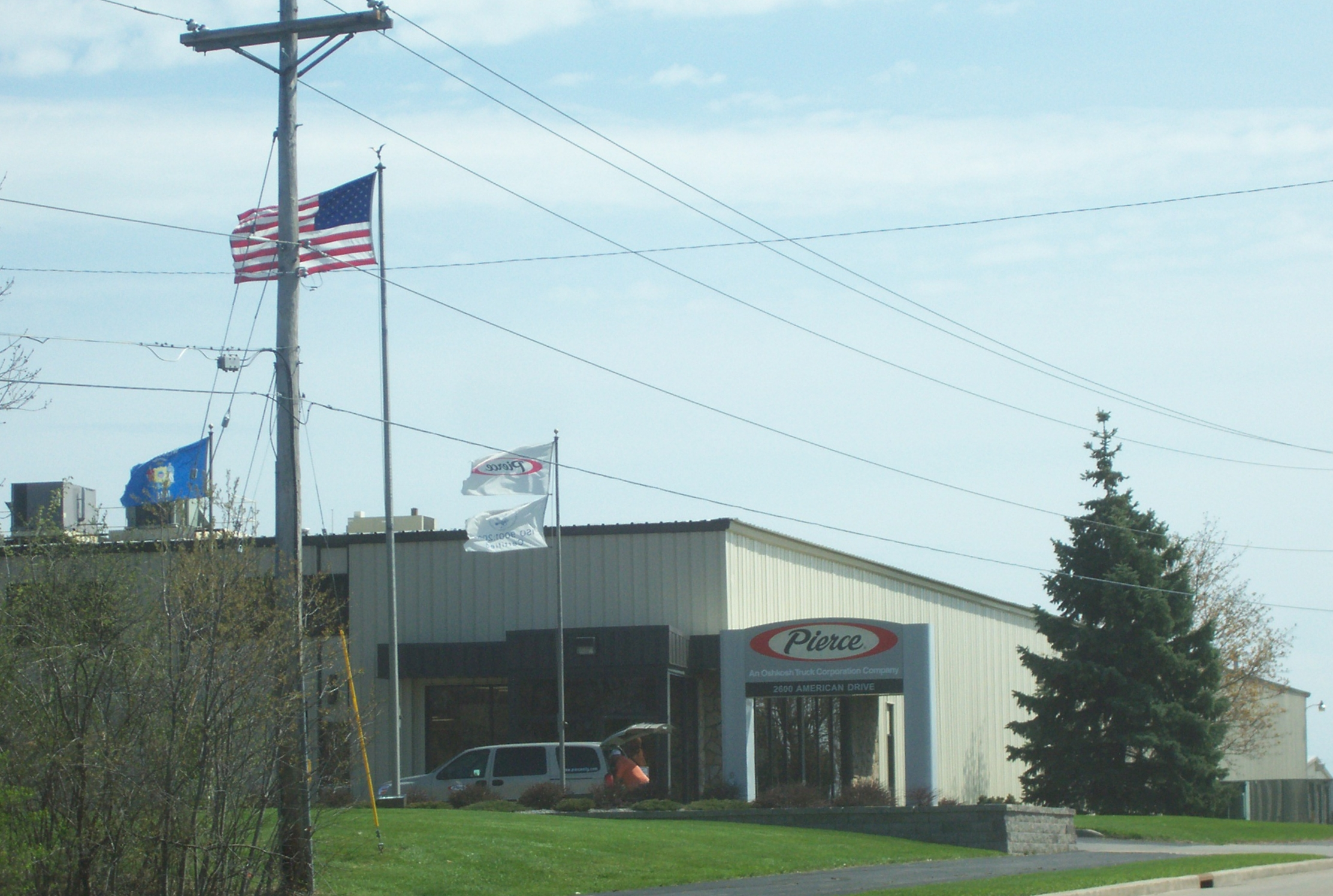
Office at headquarters

Pierce Manufacturing is a U.S. subsidiary of Oshkosh Corporation, based in Appleton, Wisconsin, that manufactures customized fire and rescue apparatus.

== History ==
Pierce Manufacturing was founded in 1913 by Humphrey Pierce and his son Dudley as the Pierce Auto Body Works Inc., which concentrated on building custom truck bodies for the Ford Model T. The first production facility was designed in 1917 and enlarged in 1918 by architect Wallace W. DeLong. From the 1960s to the early 1980s, Pierce was primarily known for building custom bodies on commercial and other manufacturer's custom chassis and was considered an original equipment manufacturer (OEM). In 1996, Pierce was wholly acquired by Oshkosh Corporation.

In September 2021, Pierce acquired an ownership interest in fire engine manufacturer Boise Mobile Equipment (BME) of Boise, Idaho.

== Pierce-Arrow ==
Although the Arrow name was used for its first custom chassis which debuted in 1979, the company has no affiliation with George N. Pierce's famous Pierce-Arrow Motor Car Company of Buffalo, New York, which operated from 1901 to 1938. However, the Pierce-Arrow Motor Car Company coincidentally supplied 8- and 12-cylinder engines to Seagrave for use in their fire apparatus. These engines continued to be made even after Pierce-Arrow ceased operation in 1938. Seagrave continued to deliver fire apparatus with the "Pierce-Arrow" V-12 until 1970.

== Other Facilities ==
Throughout the years, Pierce has had partnerships with various other manufacturers, notably when it came to aerial devices (it now designs and builds all its own aerial devices in-house). Such aerial manufacturers included Snorkel, Pitman, Aerial Innovations (AI), Ladder Towers Incorporated (LTI), Smeal, Bronto Skylift and Nova Quintech (whose assets Pierce/Oshkosh acquired in 1997). In addition to its main facilities in Wisconsin, it also has facilities in Bradenton, Florida. The Florida facility is a manufacturing site for the custom Saber chassis and Responder line of apparatus. Currently (December 4, 2017) Pierce is the largest manufacturer of firefighting apparatus in the United States. End-users are represented across a larger majority of the planet, including China. The single largest municipal fleet of Pierce Manufacturing apparatus is located within the 407 square miles of Fairfax County, Virginia. (Fairfax County Fire and Rescue Department)

== Products ==
=== Custom chassis ===
==== Discontinued ====
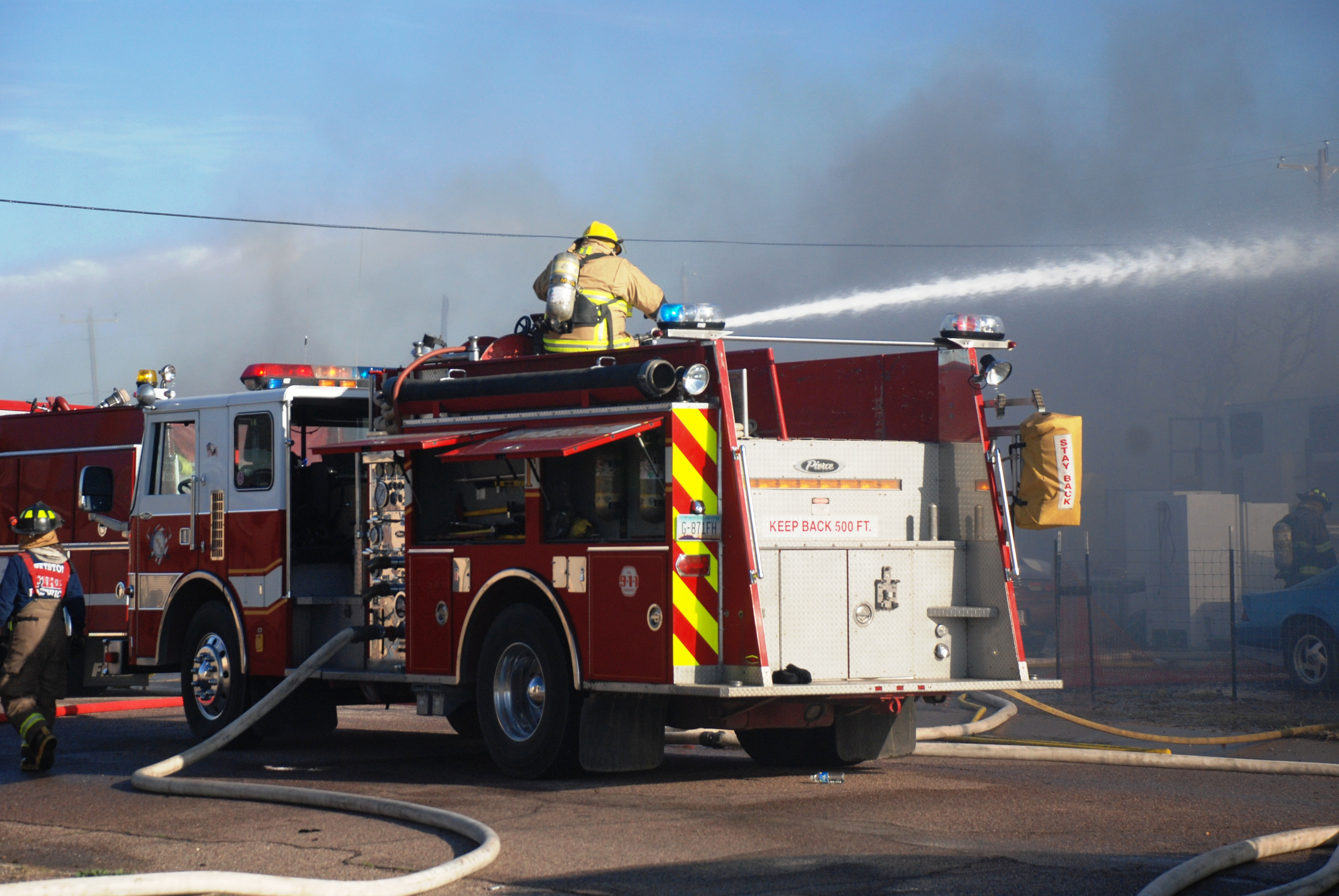
Pierce fire engine in action. Huachuca City, Arizona, 2010.

- Arrow (1980–2002)
- Contender (1999–2010)
- Dash (1984–1999)
- Dash D-8000 (1988–1992)
- Dash 2000 (1999–2007)
- Dash CF (2011–2020)
- Arrow XT (2003-2023)
- Enforcer (2000–2007; reintroduced in 2014)
- Javelin (1990–1993)
- Lance (1985–1993)
- Lance II (1993–1999)
- Lance 2000 (1999–2007)
- Quantum (1995-2023)

=== Commercial chassis ===
- Ford
- Freightliner
- Kenworth
- International
- Peterbilt

=== Apparatus ===
- Rearmount and midmount steel aerial ladders
- Rearmount aluminum aerial ladders
- Rearmount and midmount steel aerial platforms
- Rearmount aluminum aerial platforms
- Tractor drawn steel aerial ladders
- Telescoping and/or articulating water tower booms
- Standard and rescue midmount pumpers
- Standard and rescue rearmount pumpers
- Pumper-tankers/tankers/tenders and elliptical tankers/tenders
- Mini pumpers
- Wildland/brush pumpers (Types 1 through 6)
- Walk-in and non-walk-in heavy rescues
- Walk-in and non-walk-in medium rescues
- Walk-in and non-walk-in light rescues
- Homeland security vehicles
- Command, communication, and rehab vehicles
- Foam proportioning systems
- Fire Patrol Trucks
  - Pierce Voltera, an electrically-powered truck

== Gallery ==
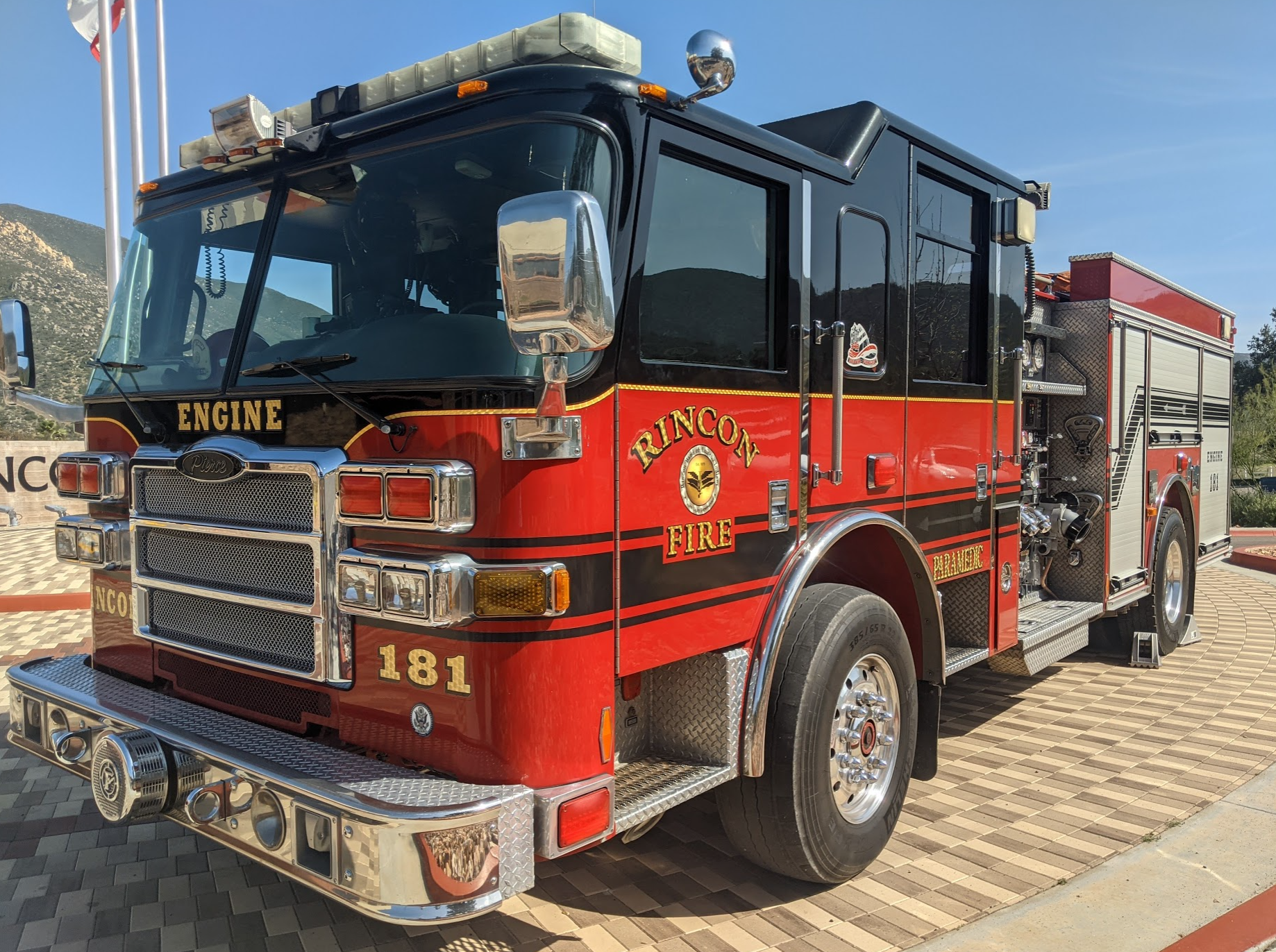
Engine 181 of the Rincon Fire Department

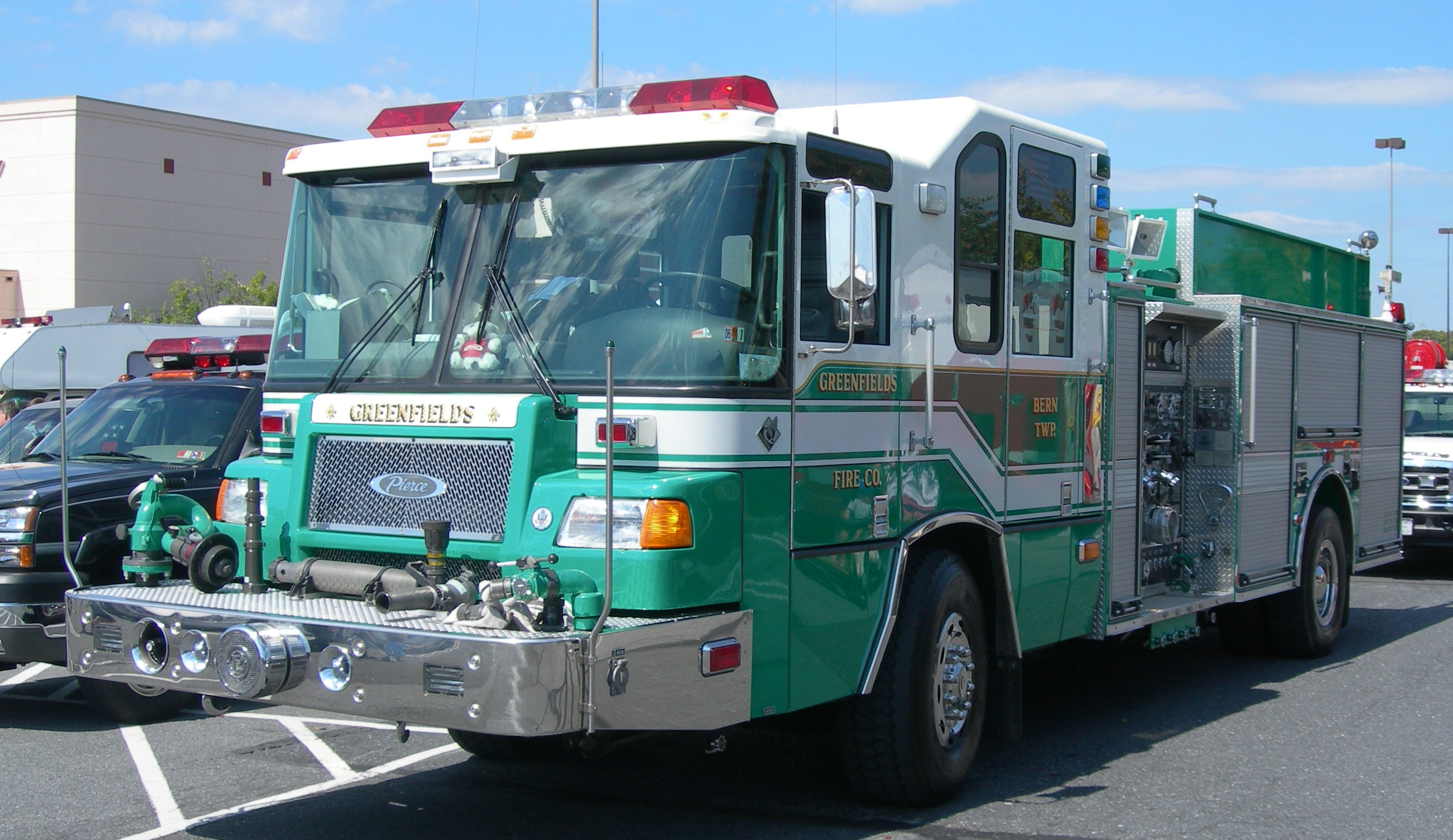
Engine 55 of the Greenfields Fire Co, PA. 1999 Pierce Quantum Pumper

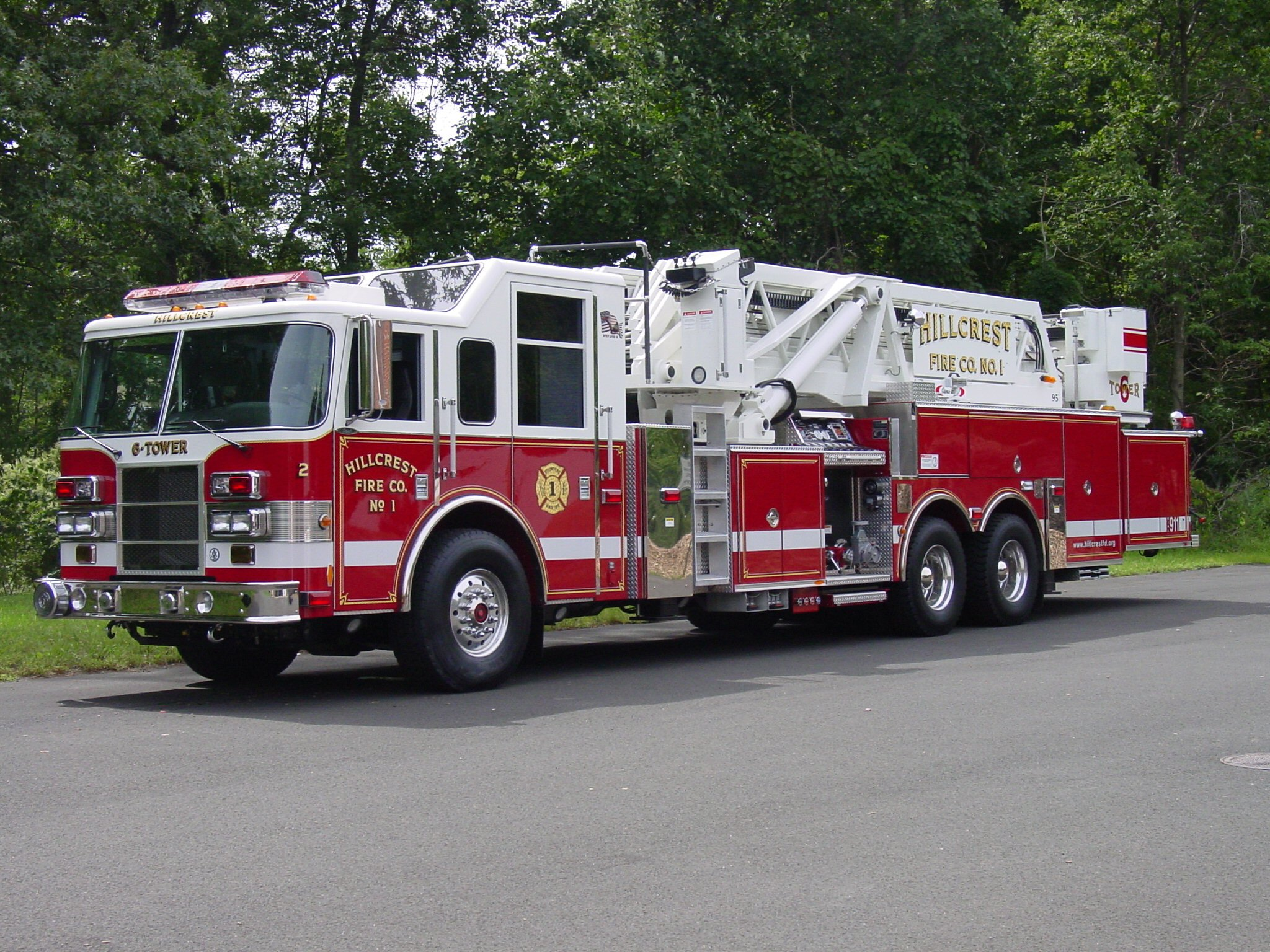
6-Tower of the Hillcrest Fire Co. #1, NY. 2002 Pierce Dash 2000 95' Midmount Aerial Platform Quint

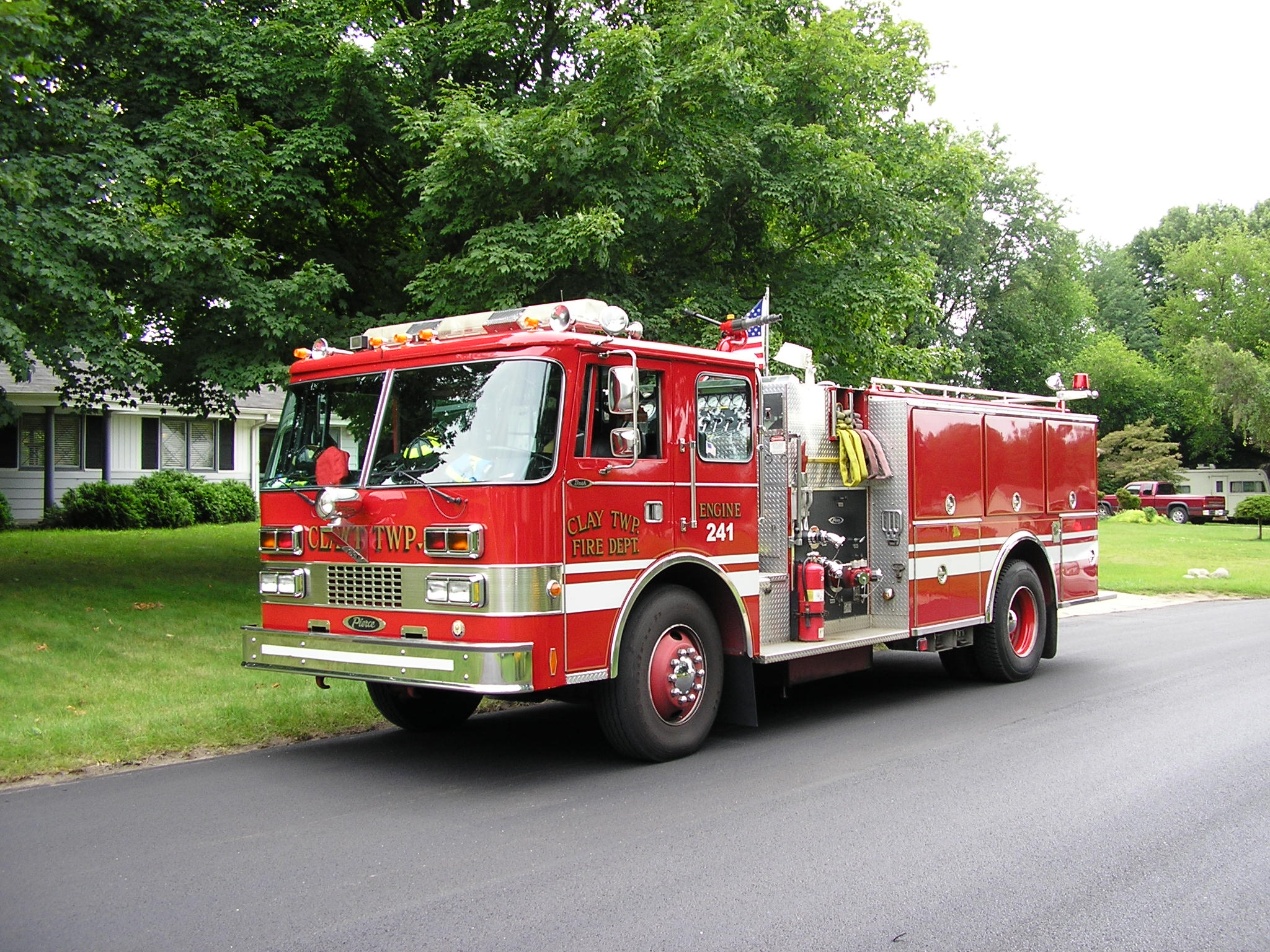
Reserve Engine 249 of the Clay Fire Territory, IN. 1985 Pierce Dash Pumper

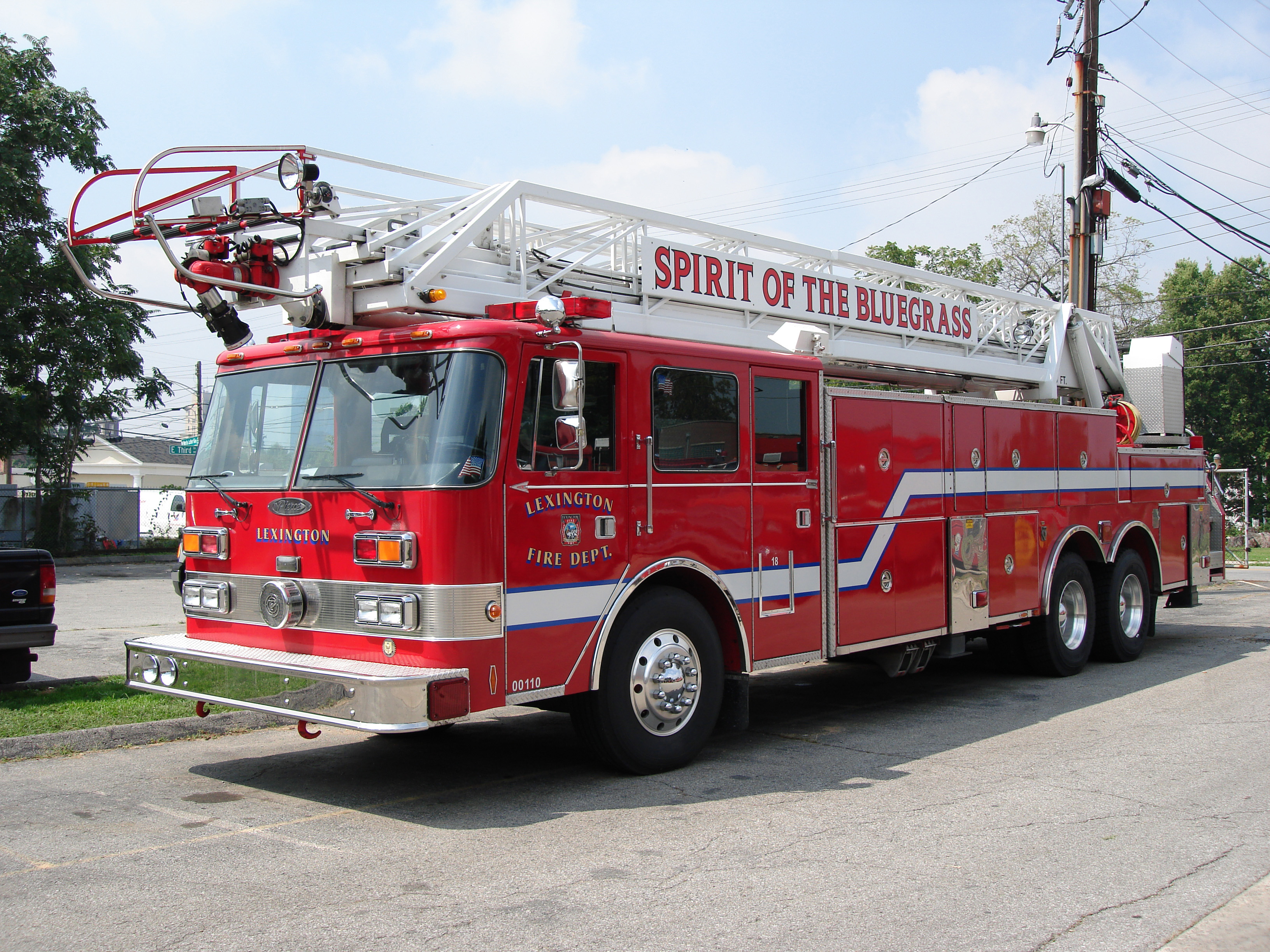
Reserve Ladder 18 serving the Lexington Fire Department, KY. Pierce Arrow 105' X-Ladder 1

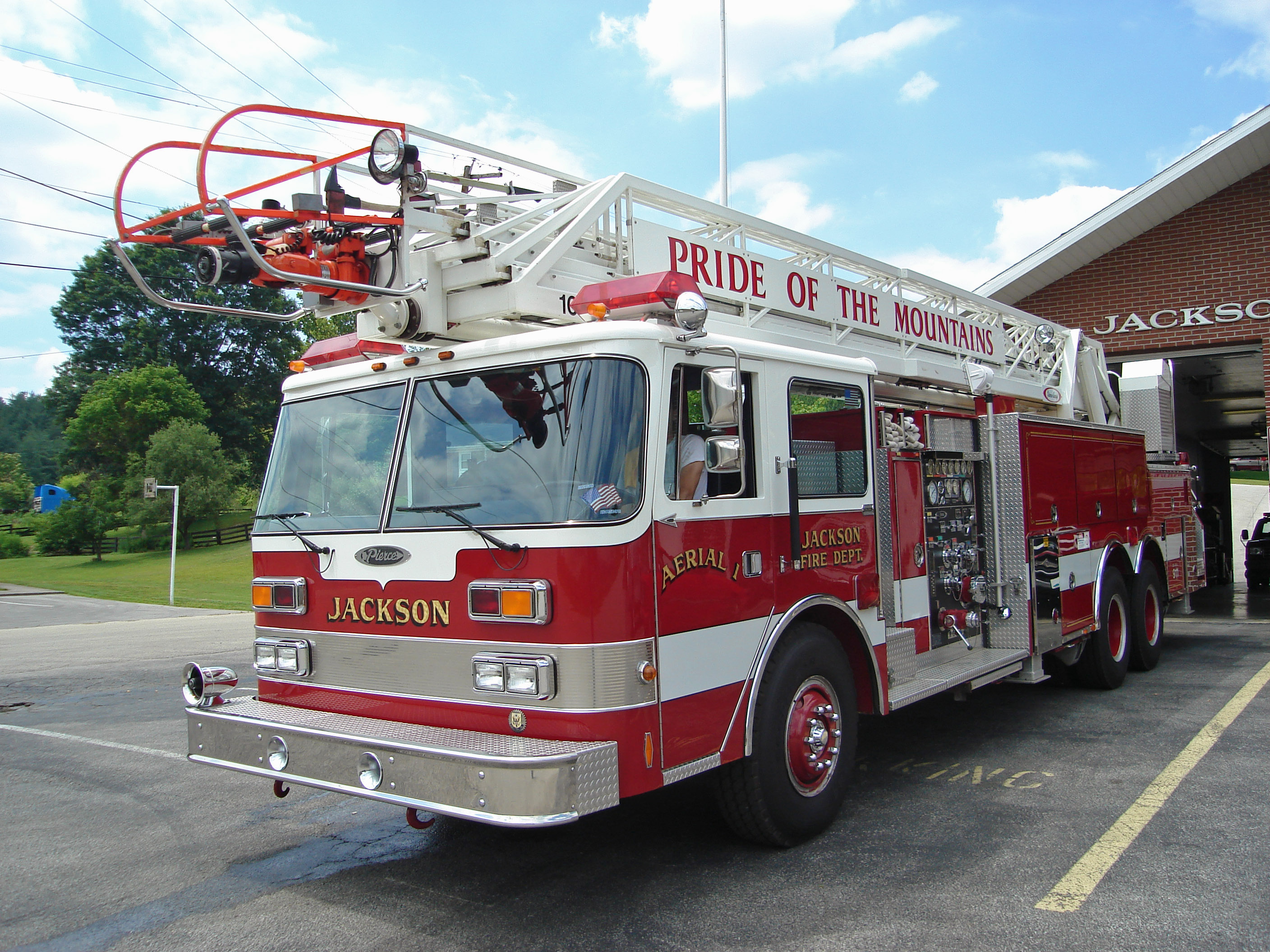
Aerial 1 serving the Jackson Fire Department, KY. 1988 Pierce Arrow 105' canopy cab

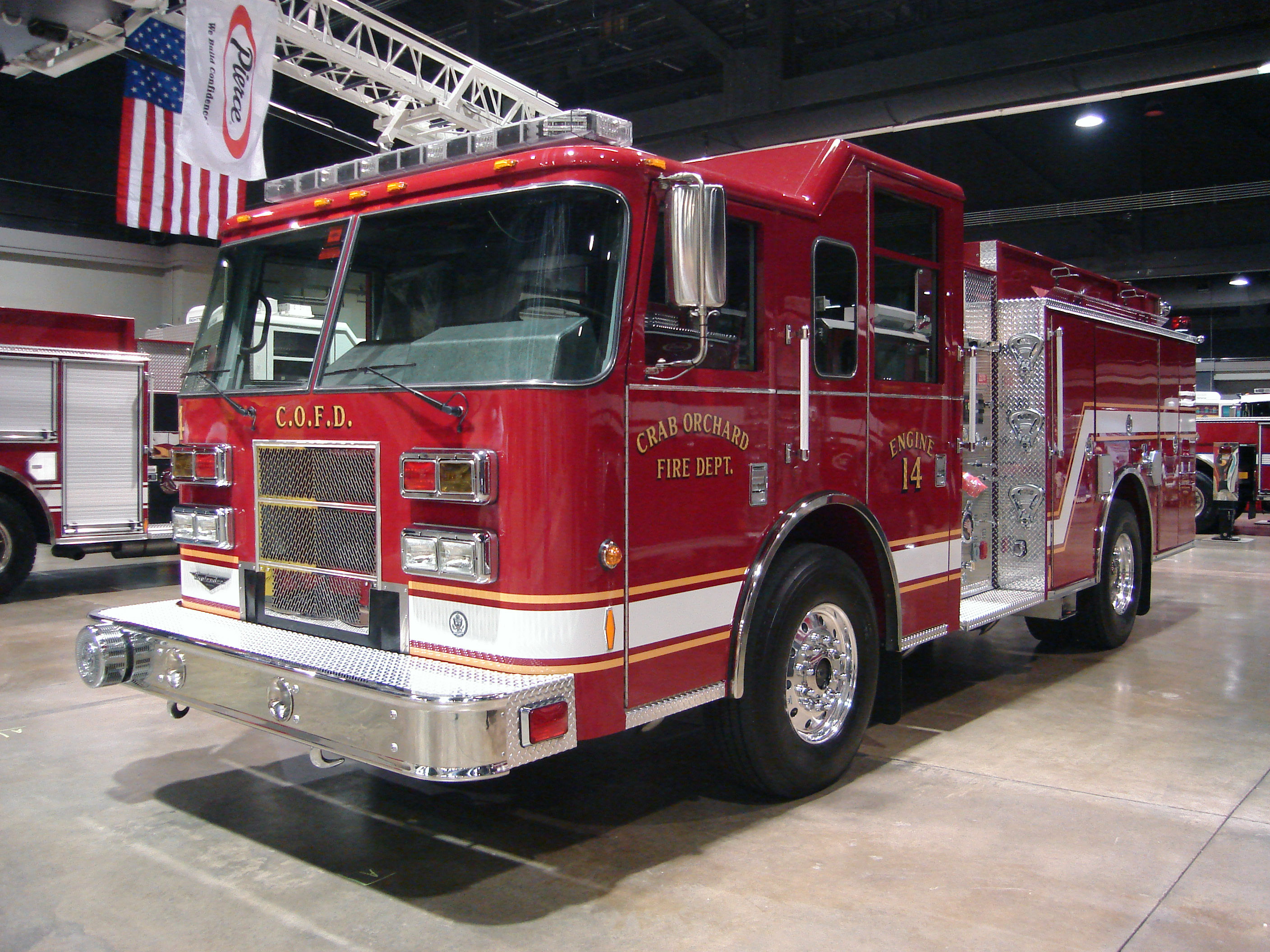
Engine 14 serving the Crab Orchard Fire Department, KY. 2006 Pierce Contender custom cab

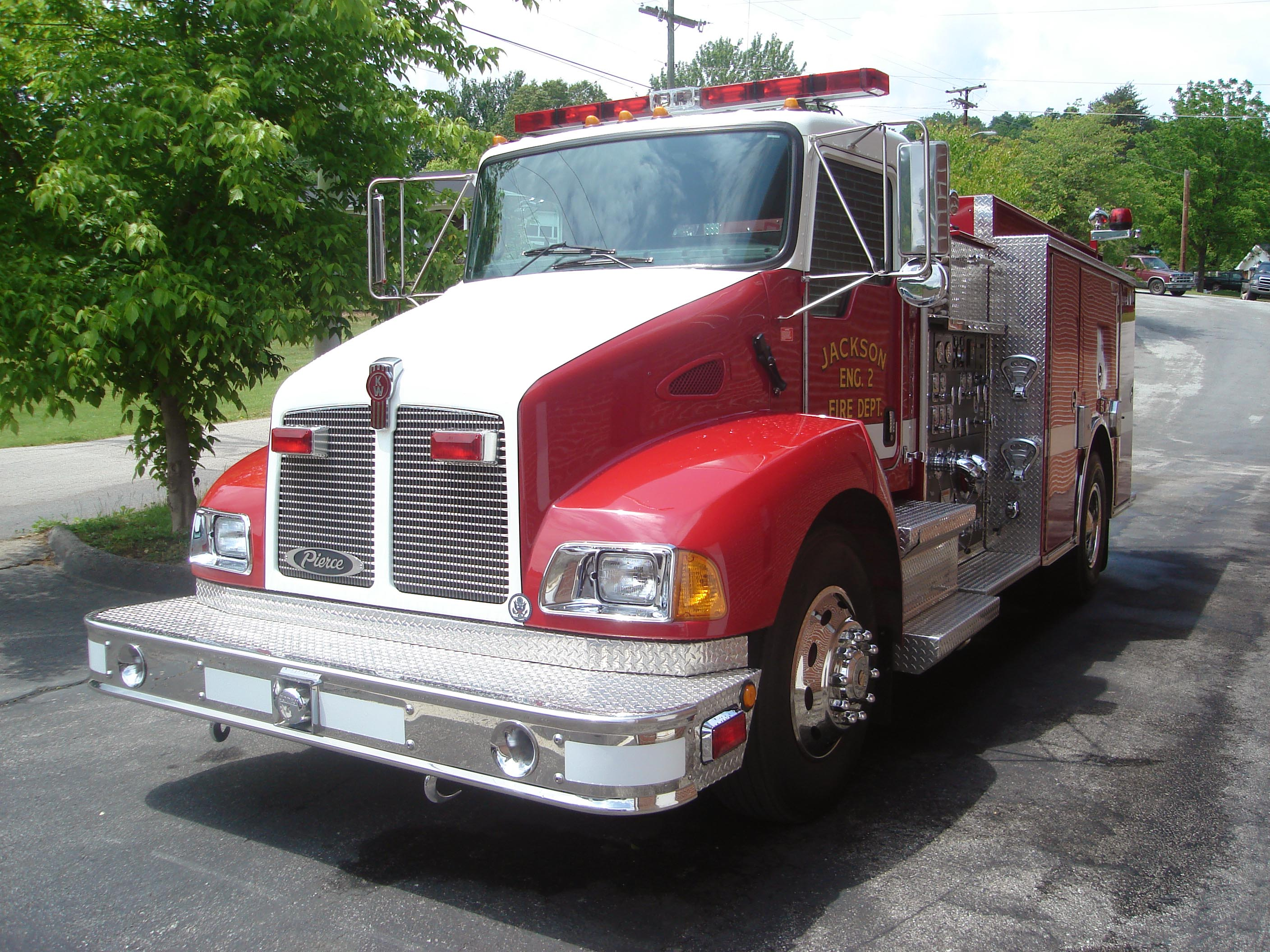
Engine 2 serving the Jackson Fire Department, KY. 2003 Pierce Contender-Kenworth single cab

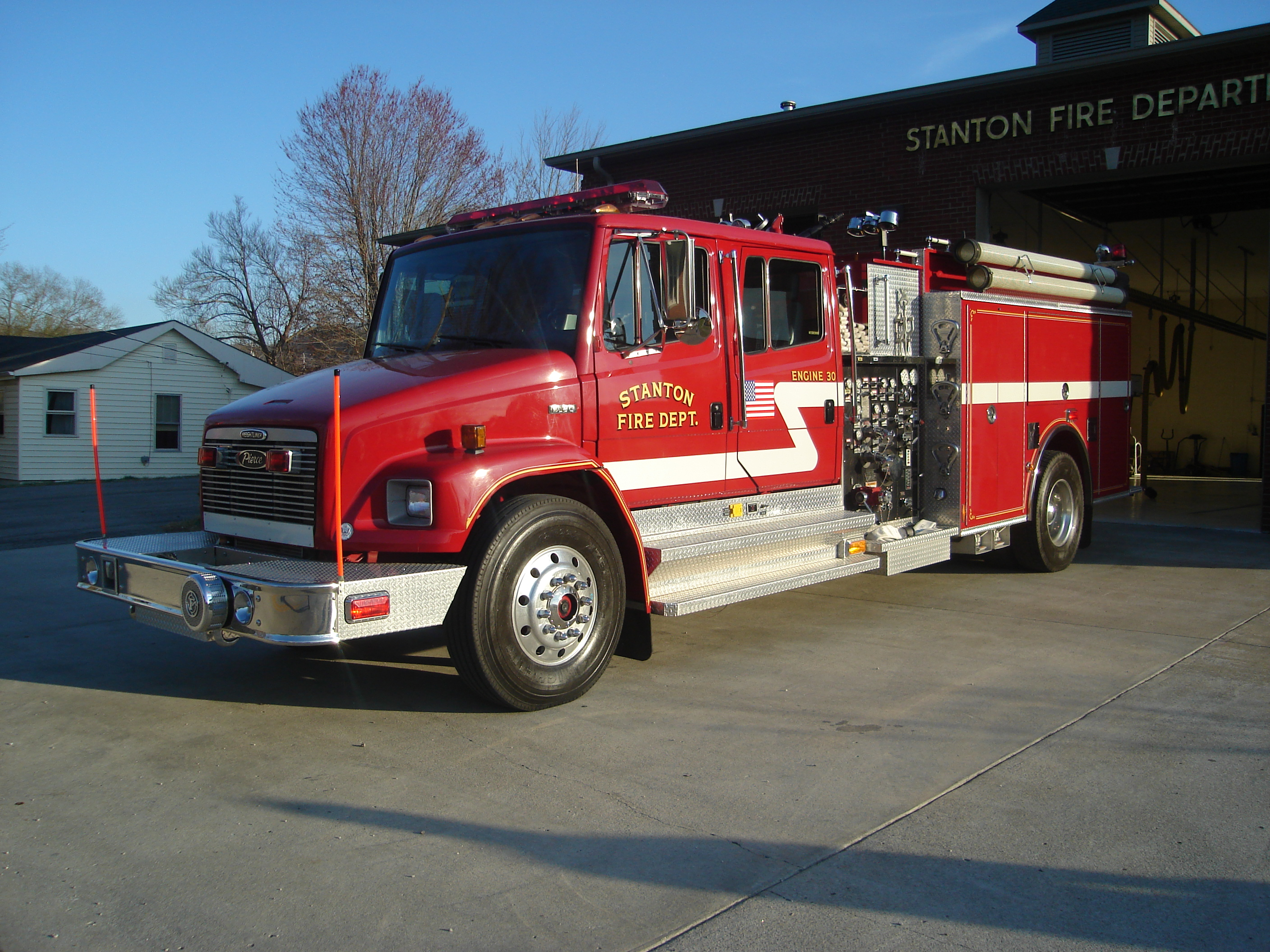
Engine 30 serving the Stanton Fire Department, KY. 2002 Pierce Contender-Freightliner crew cab

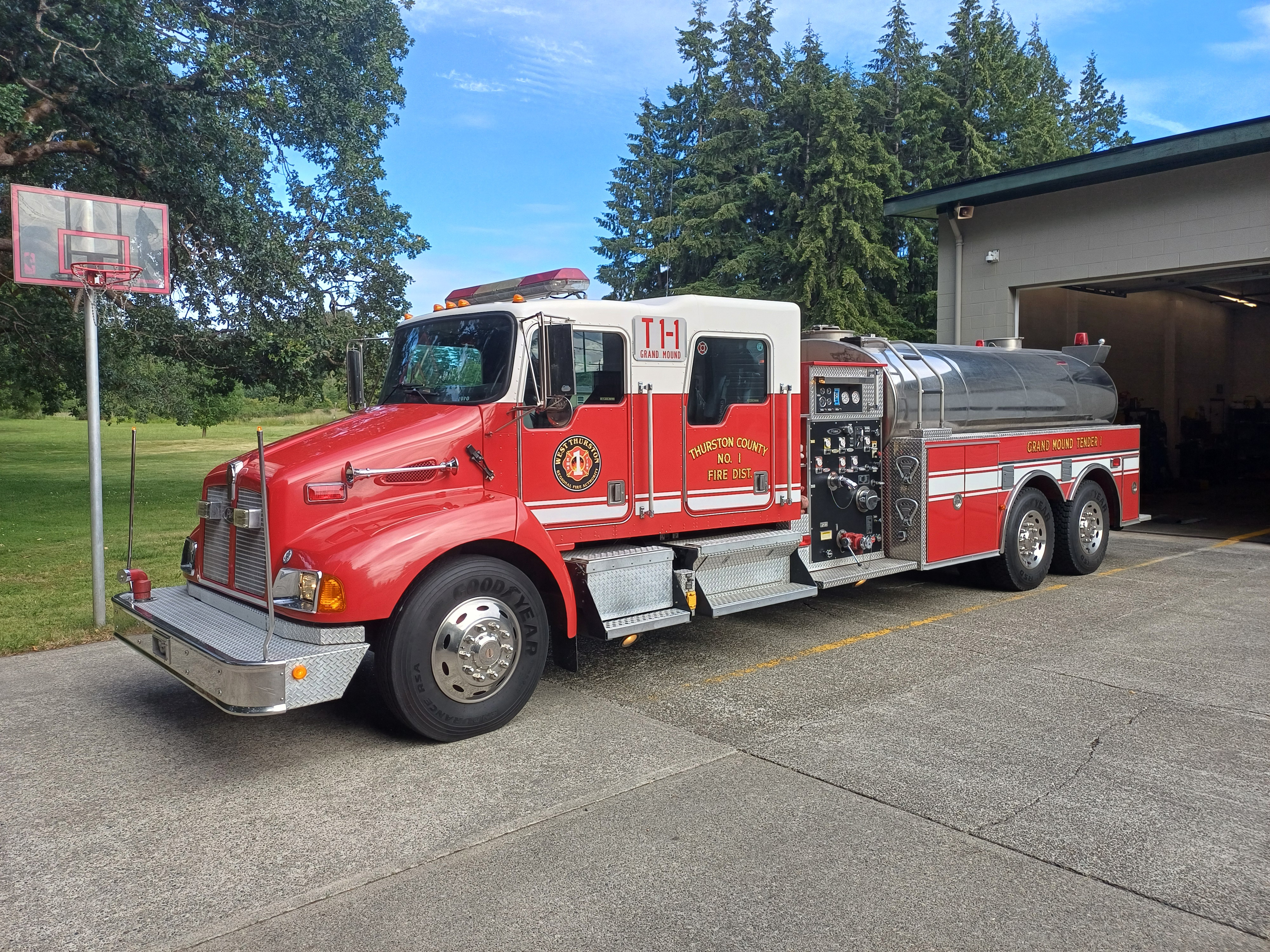
Tender 1-1 serving the West Thurston Regional Fire Authority, WA. 2002 Pierce tanker - Kenworth tandem crew cab

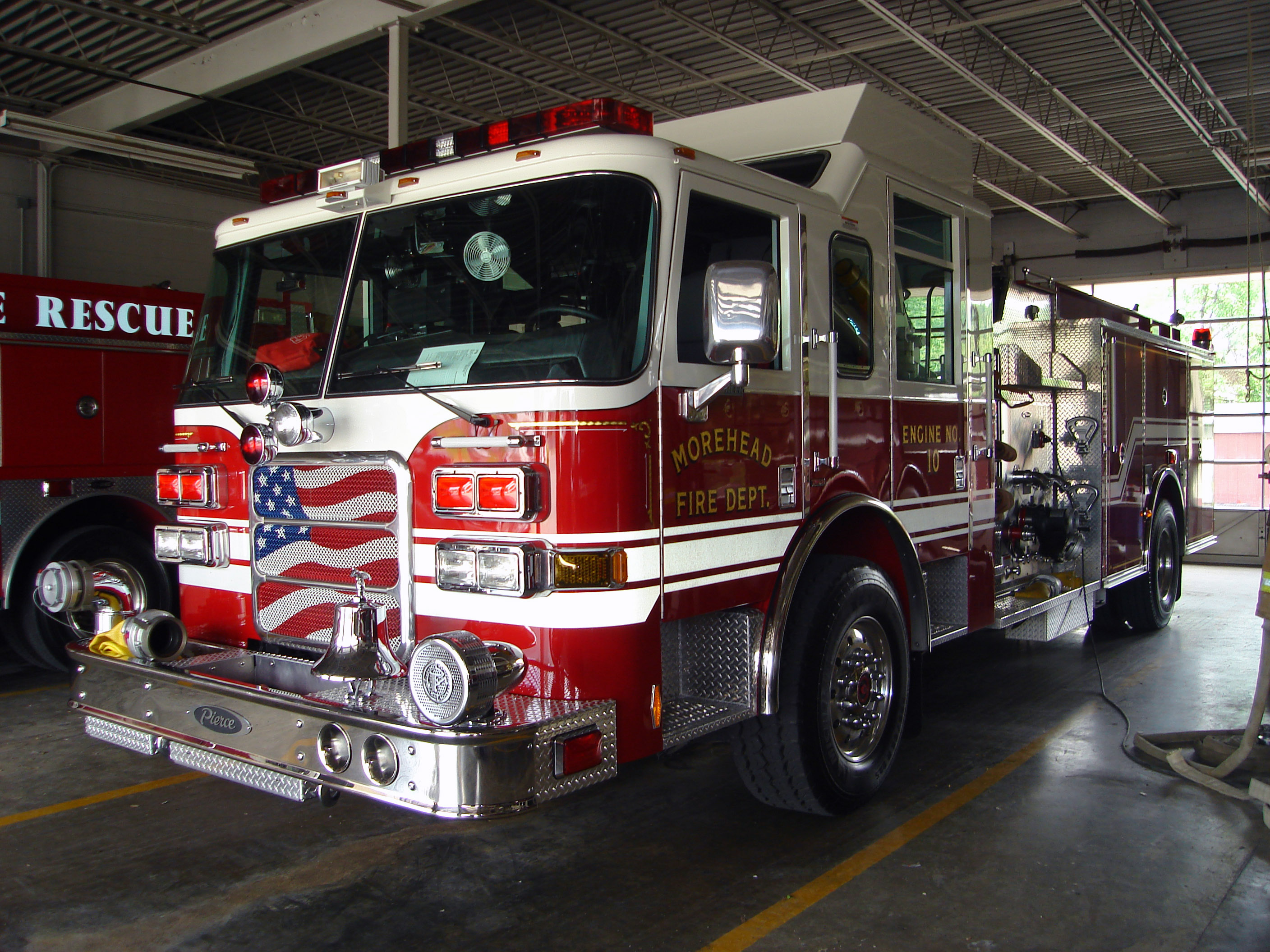
Engine 10 serving the Morehead Fire Department, KY. 2005 Pierce Enforcer with Roto Ray

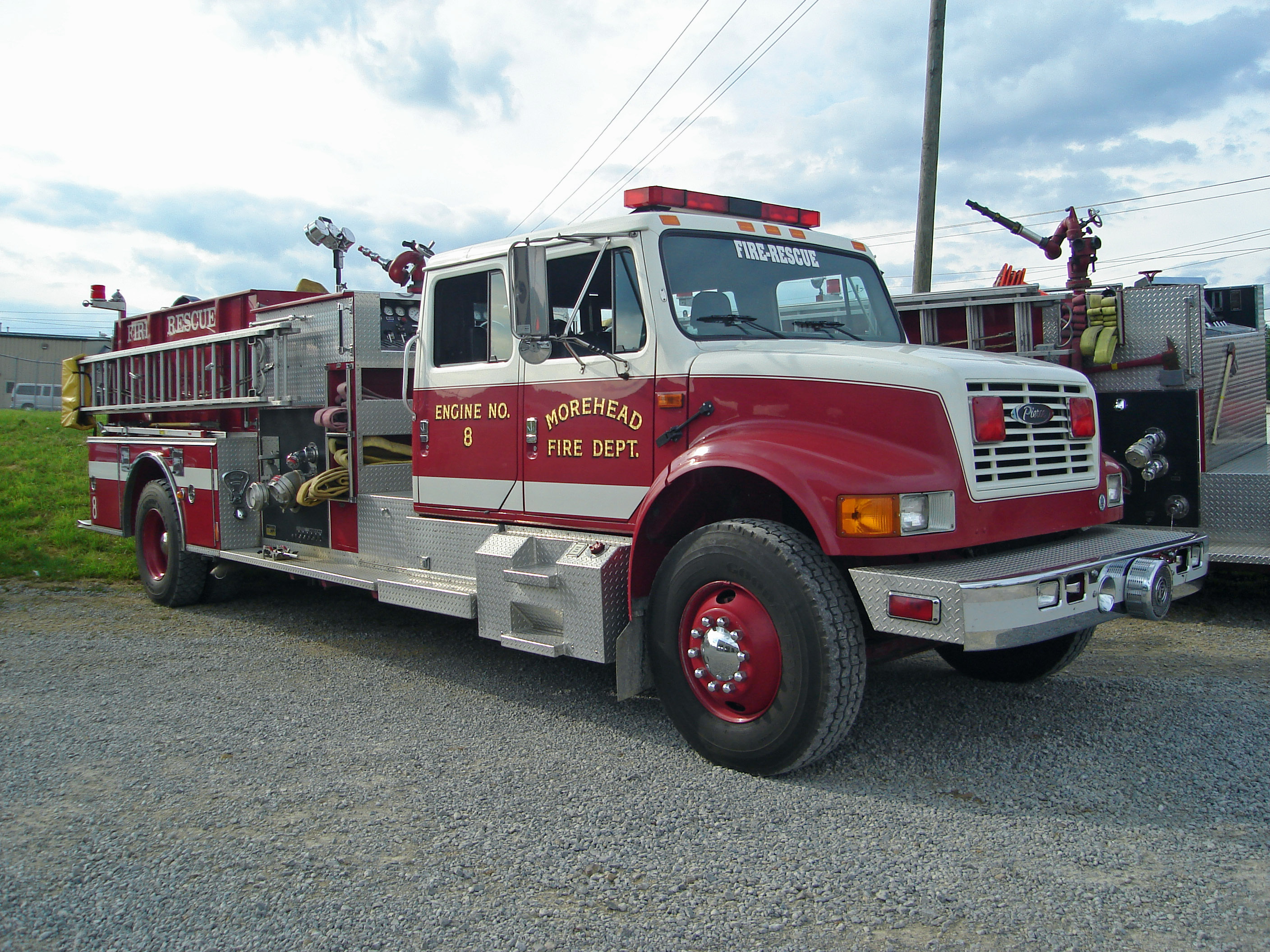
Engine 8 serving the Morehead Fire Department, KY. 1993 Pierce Responder-International crew cab

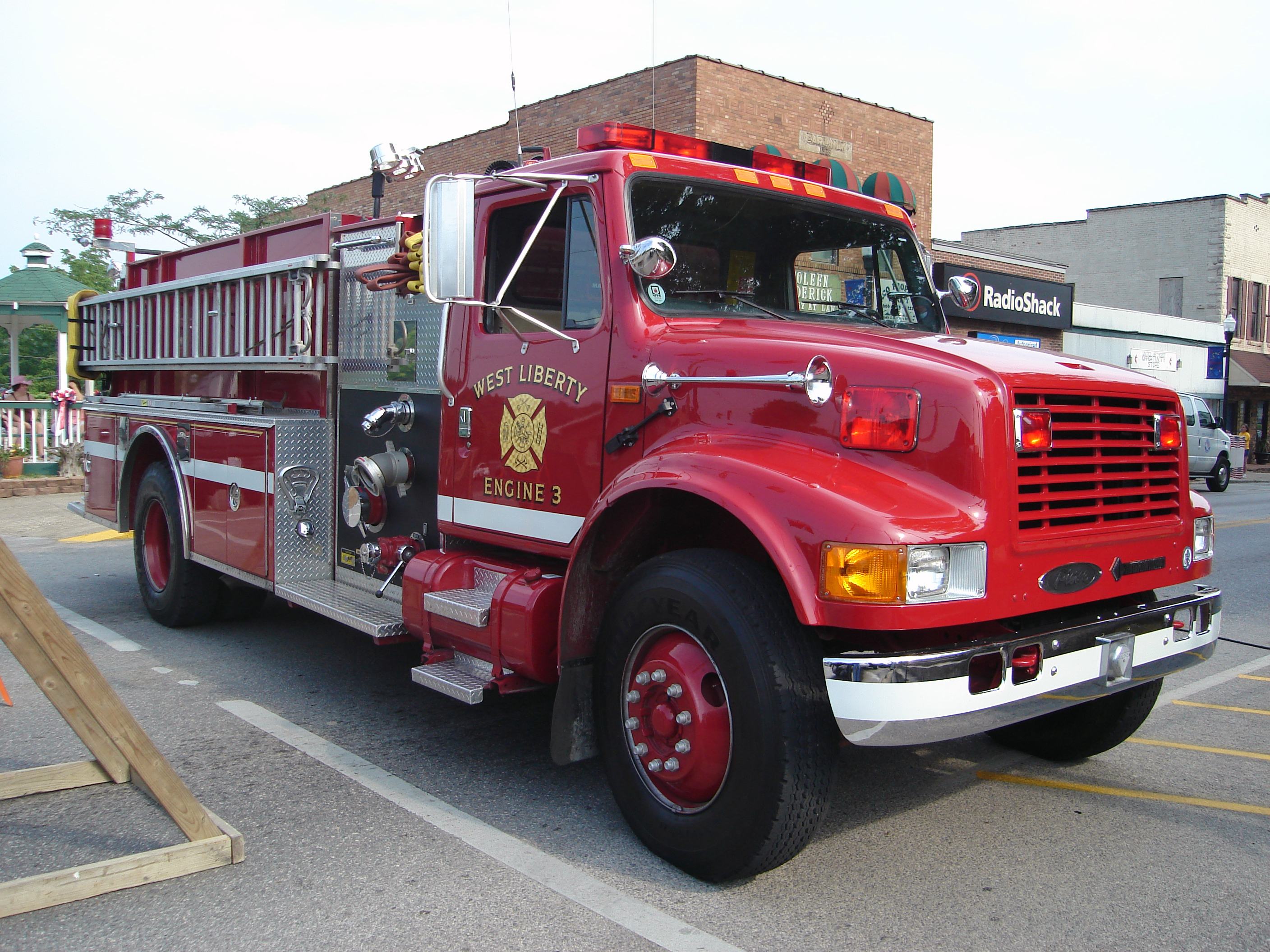
Engine 3 serving the West Liberty Fire Department, KY. 1993 Pierce Responder-International single cab

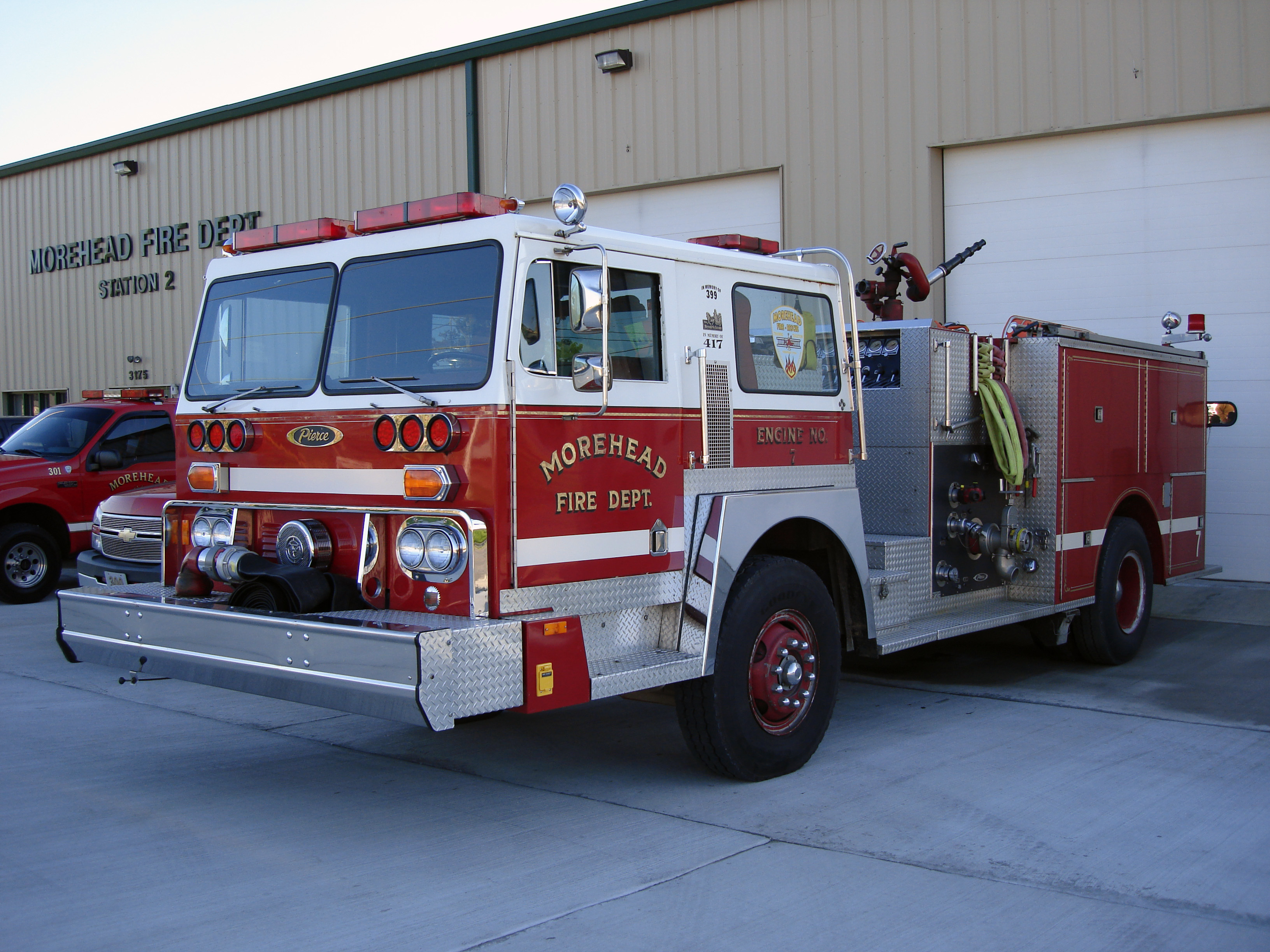
Engine 7 serving the Morehead Fire Department, KY. 1979 Pierce-Hendrickson custom cab

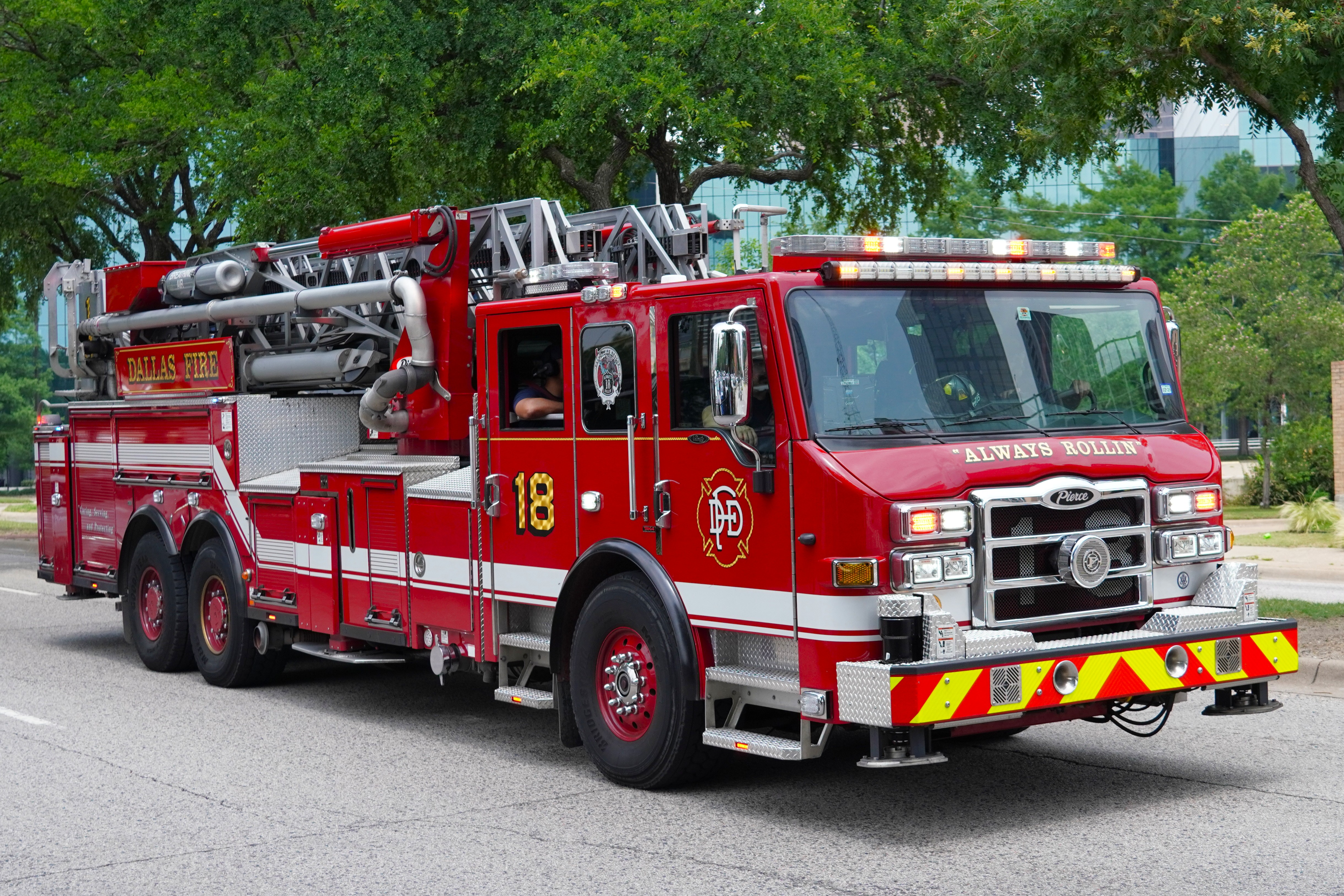
Truck 18 of Dallas Fire-Rescue Department, Texas. 2020 Pierce Velocity 100' Ascendant mid-mount platform
