= Henry Budd (priest) =

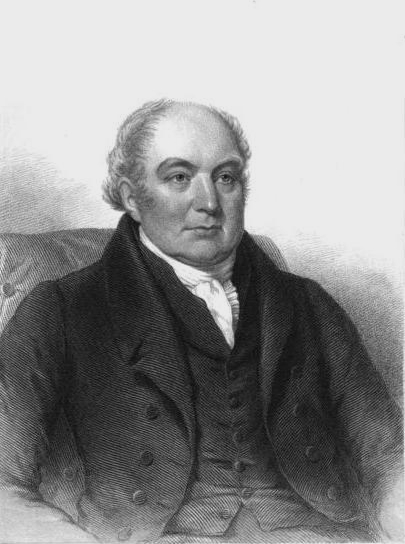
Henry Budd

Henry Budd (1774–1853) was an English cleric and theologian.

== Life ==
Born at Newbury, Berkshire on 25 September 1774, he was the son of the physician Richard Budd and his wife Marie Stabler. He was in residence at St John's College, Cambridge, from October 1793 to June 1797, and graduated B.A. in 1798, and M.A. in 1801.

After his ordination, 31 December 1797, Budd became curate of Aldermaston, Berkshire. Thanks to lobbying by his father, he was appointed chaplain of Bridewell Hospital, London, in 1801, a post he resigned in 1831. He was instituted to the rectory of White Roothing, Essex, 18 March 1808.

Budd died at White Roothing 27 June 1853, and was buried in the churchyard there on 4 July.

== Interests ==
Budd was an evangelical, and active in church matters. He was connected with the Newfoundland Society for the Education of the Poor. A specialised charity to provide teachers, it was founded in 1823, and taken under his wing by William Wilberforce. Budd was on its committee with Edward Bickersteth, the Rev. Samuel Crowther of Christ Church Greyfriars, Josiah Pratt and Daniel Wilson. Budd was also involved with the African Missions, and the Church Missionary Society.

=== Prayer Book and Homily Society ===
Budd was one of the founders of the Prayer Book and Homily Society (PBHS) on 21 May 1812, and for some time acted as its secretary. He was among the evangelicals dissatisfied with the Society for Promoting Christian Knowledge (SPCK), and the Bampton Lecture for 1812 by Richard Mant brought matters to a head, with its doctrinal insistence on baptismal regeneration and salvation by works. Budd spent the early part of 1812 setting up the PBHS, with avowed aim of distributing the Book of Common Prayer and Book of Homilies without commentary; institutionally it appeared as complementary to the British and Foreign Bible Society, and the membership was predominantly evangelical.

The PBHS was proposed at a meeting on 20 May 1812 at the Freemasons' Tavern in London chaired by Lord Valentia. On 22 May Budd wrote to his long-term correspondent Charles Smith Bird:

We propose to sell the Homilies as Tracts, and sell them at a halfpenny, a penny or a farthing each, according to their size. The Bishops have declined to give us their support. We disclaim all intention of interfering with Bartlett's Buildings [i.e. the SPCK]. They do not sell the Homilies, and never have done [...]

The society was backed by William Wilberforce, as an alternative to the SPCK, and the Clapham Sect was strongly represented. Its first Annual General Meeting in 1813 was chaired by Thomas Babington, in the absence of Budd who was in poor health. At the time the society had financial troubles. Two years later, Budd and the Rev. Charles Richard Pritchett had prepared an edition of the Book of Homilies for publication.

=== Works of the English Reformers and the Parker Society ===
Peter Toon wrote that Budd was "the passionate advocate of the writings of the English Reformers", i.e . the works of the leading writers of the English Reformation. In 1827, Budd proposed the founding of a text publication society to reprint those works. That year, John Broadley Wilson, an Anglican with a Particular Baptist background, became treasurer of the Religious Tract Society (RTS). He shared Budd's interest in the works of the early Reformers, also favouring the later Puritan divines. From 1831, the RTS published a 12-volume "British Reformers" library of selected works.

A pseudonymous letter was published in the Christian Observer, explaining some of the background to the RTS British Reformers library. It had been funded by Wilson. While it was partly based on Legh Richmond's "Fathers of the English Church", it went further, while taking over some textual omissions from that selection. The project was not intended to replace Budd's plan for a text society. The letter was signed "'The Anonymous Editor' of the British Reformers".

After the success of the Cattley edition of Foxe's Book of Martyrs (the generic name for derived works of John Foxe's Actes and Monuments) from the end of the 1830s, George Stokes (1789–1847), a lay activist of the RTS, took up Budd's original suggestion, and the Parker Society was formed in 1840. In an 1842 pseudonymous apologetical work, writing as "Editor of the British Reformers", Stokes cited some of Budd's views: against the retaining of archaic forms of English verbs; in favour of full, literal reprints, as opposed to the selections issued by the RTS; and consequently on omissions of the Reformers' criticisms of Anabaptists, respecting Baptist views.

== Works ==
Budd published Infant Baptism, the means of National Regeneration, according to the Doctrine and Discipline of the Established Church. In nine Letters to a Friend, 1827, 3rd ed. 1841. Budd's position on infant baptism gained the support of Henry Drummond and Walter Shirley, and qualified approval from F. D. Maurice. The third edition added a preface of 280 pages on baptismal regeneratiion.

It also influenced the views of Edward Bickersteth and Hugh M'Neile, who connected baptism to regeneration, and to eternal election, the precondition of eternal security; some reconsideration by them and their followers may have taken place after the Gorham judgement, given on appeal by the Judicial Committee of the Privy Council on 8 March 1850. The outcome of that case reduced the chances for Anglican clergy of what Stephen Waddams has characterised as an "Anglo-Catholic witch-hunt" on the theology of baptism.

Budd was also the author of:

- Salvation by Grace (1820). A sermon preached at Dunmow on 10 June 1819 for the visitation of George Cambridge, Archdeacon of Middlesex. There was a polemical reply the same year, in the form of a letter, from the Rev. William Henry Rowlatt, Reader at the Temple Church.
- The Present Controversy in the Bible Society briefly considered, in a Letter to a Friend, 1832.
- Helps for the Young, or Baptismal Regeneration according to the Services of the Established Church. In a series of twelve tracts, 1832–9, 2 vols.
- A Petition proposed to be presented respectively to the Three Estates of the Legislature on the subject of Church Reform, with an Address to the Ministers and Members of the Established Church, 1833.

A Memoir including correspondence was published in 1855 for his executors. It was edited anonymously by the Rev. Hastings Robinson, with the Rev. Thomas Harding (1805–1874), Vicar of Bexley.

== Family ==
Budd was three times married, and left issue. By his first marriage in 1803 Eliza Henrietta Lewin (died 1806), he had a child. In 1814 he married, secondly, Jane Hale (died 1821), 11th daughter of General John Hale of the Plantation, near Guisborough. They had children including: the educator Richard Hale Budd (1816–1893); daughter Elizabeth Hale Budd who married in 1844 the Rev. Osman Parke Vincent, son of John Painter Vincent, and formerly a suitor of Ellen Nussey; and second son Henry Budd, a surgeon, who died at Heidelberg, Victoria in 1856, aged 36. In 1849 Budd's daughter Emma Mary was married, by Rev. Osman Parke Vincent, to J. Dore Williams, son of Pierce Williams of Hatfield Broad Oak.

Budd married, thirdly in 1829, Jane, widow of the Rev. George White, and of the Rev. Richard Wager Allix. She was Jane Waldron, daughter of Francis Waldron of Cartron in Ireland; she married George White of Knutsford at Grappenhall in 1817. White is identified as the George White who matriculated at St John's College, Oxford in 1806. He died at Knutsford in 1818.
