= Gervase Wheeler =

- Born: c. 1815; England
- Died: January 1st, 1889
- Occupation: Architect

Gervase Wheeler (1815–1889) was a British architect, writer, and illustrator who designed homes in the United States.

Wheeler is best known for publishing influential architectural pattern books Rural Homes (1851) and Homes for the People in Suburb and Country (1855). These books include house plans as illustrations, while the prose focuses on architectural best practices and Wheeler's personal opinions about American culture and aesthetics. He promoted Italianate style as well as Carpenter Gothic.

Wheeler moved to the U.S. in 1846 or 1847 and stayed until the 1860s, after which he returned to London.

== Personal life ==
Wheeler's father, who was also named Gervase, worked as a manufacturer of gold, silver and gilded jewelry from 1832 to 1844. London directories indicate he worked at 28 Bartlett's Buildings in Holborn, then just outside London.

In 1855, he stated that "the desire to build, to have a home of one's own is implanted in the breast of every American, and I fancy statistics would show that the number of those who own homesteads in this country far exceeds England."

== Selected architectural works ==
- Henry Boody House, Brunswick, Maine (1848–49)
- Olmstead House, East Hartford, Connecticut (1849, the design of which inspired The Willows, Morristown, New Jersey)
- Edward Bartlett House, Rockwood Hall, Mount Pleasant, New York (1849)
- Joshua Newton Perkins House, Norwich, Connecticut (1850–51)
- Insurance Company of North America Building, Philadelphia, Pennsylvania (1850)
- First Presbyterian Church, Owego, New York (1854)
- Patrick Barry House, Rochester, New York (1856–58)
- Chapel at Williams College, Williamstown, Massachusetts (1856–59)
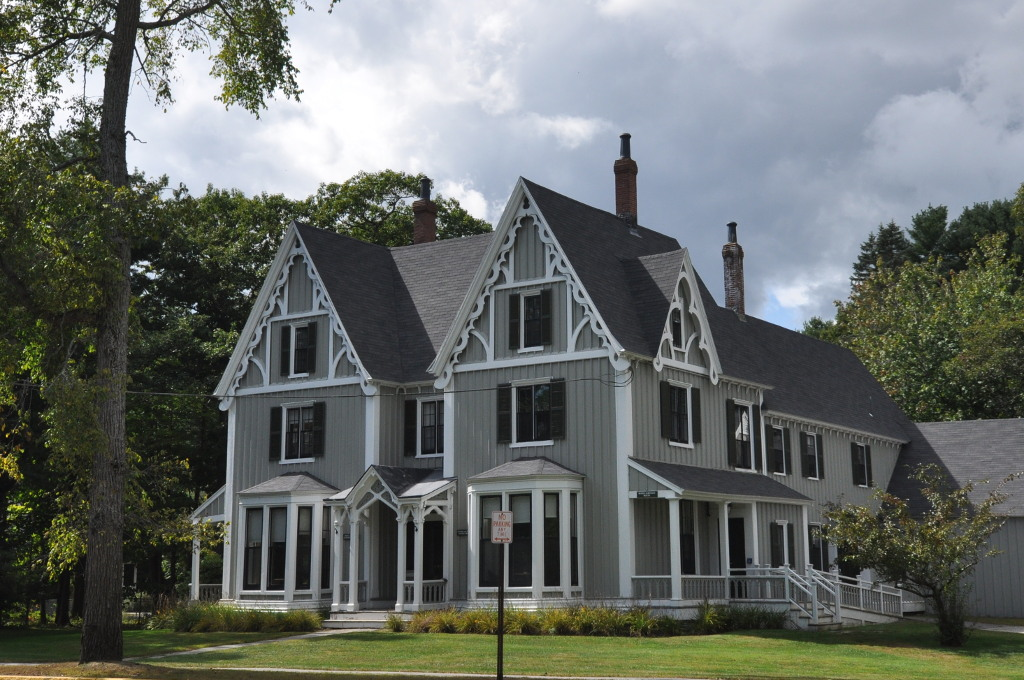
Henry Boody House

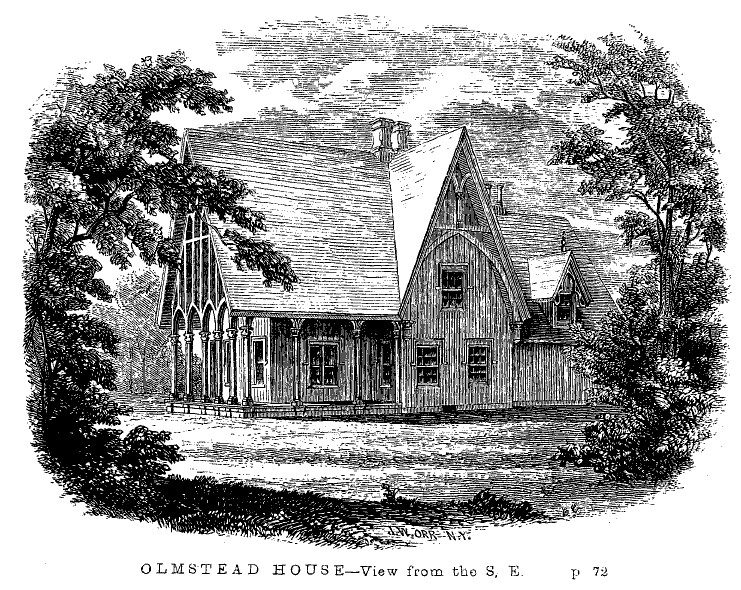
Olmstead House

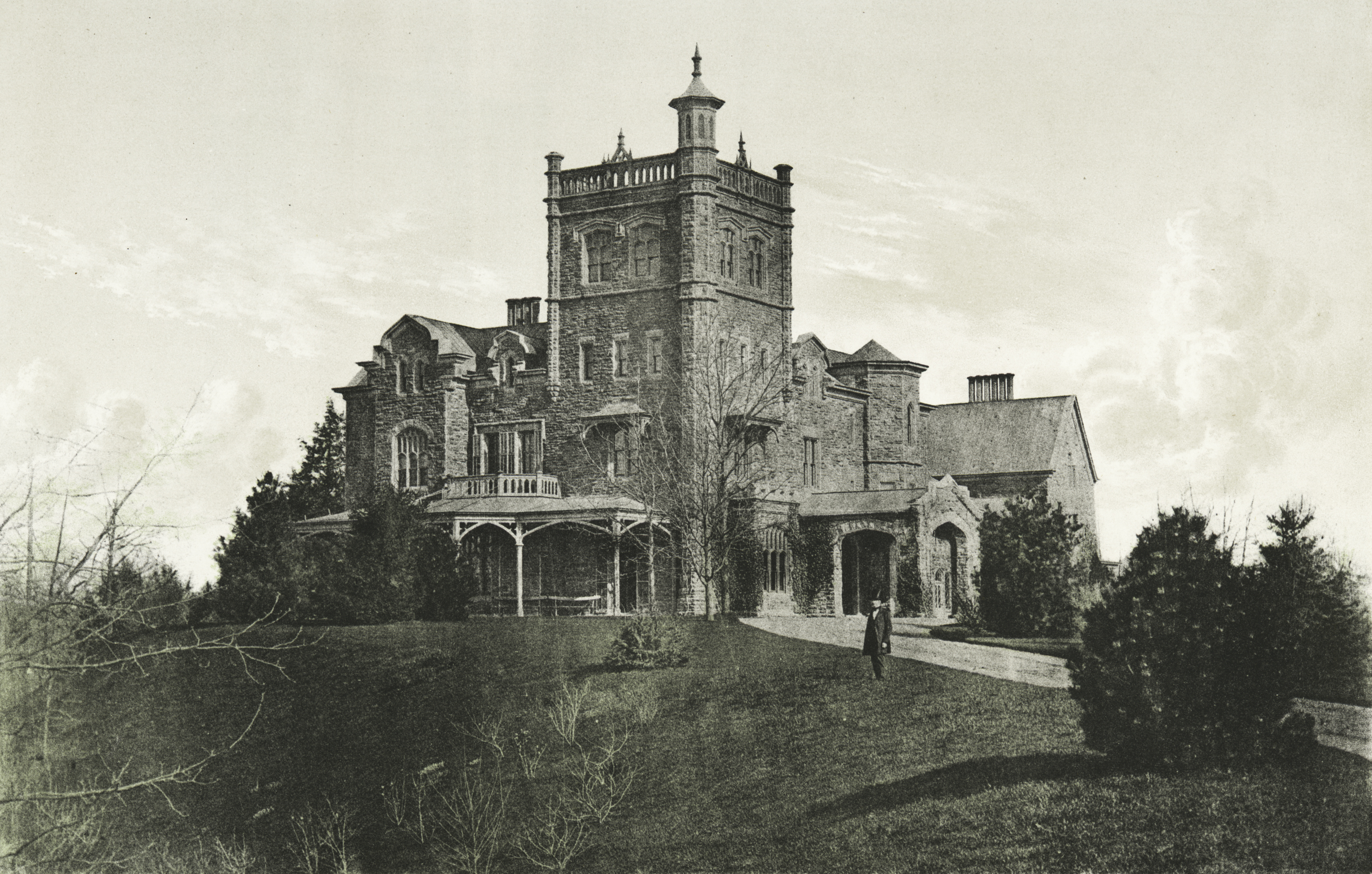
Rockwood Hall

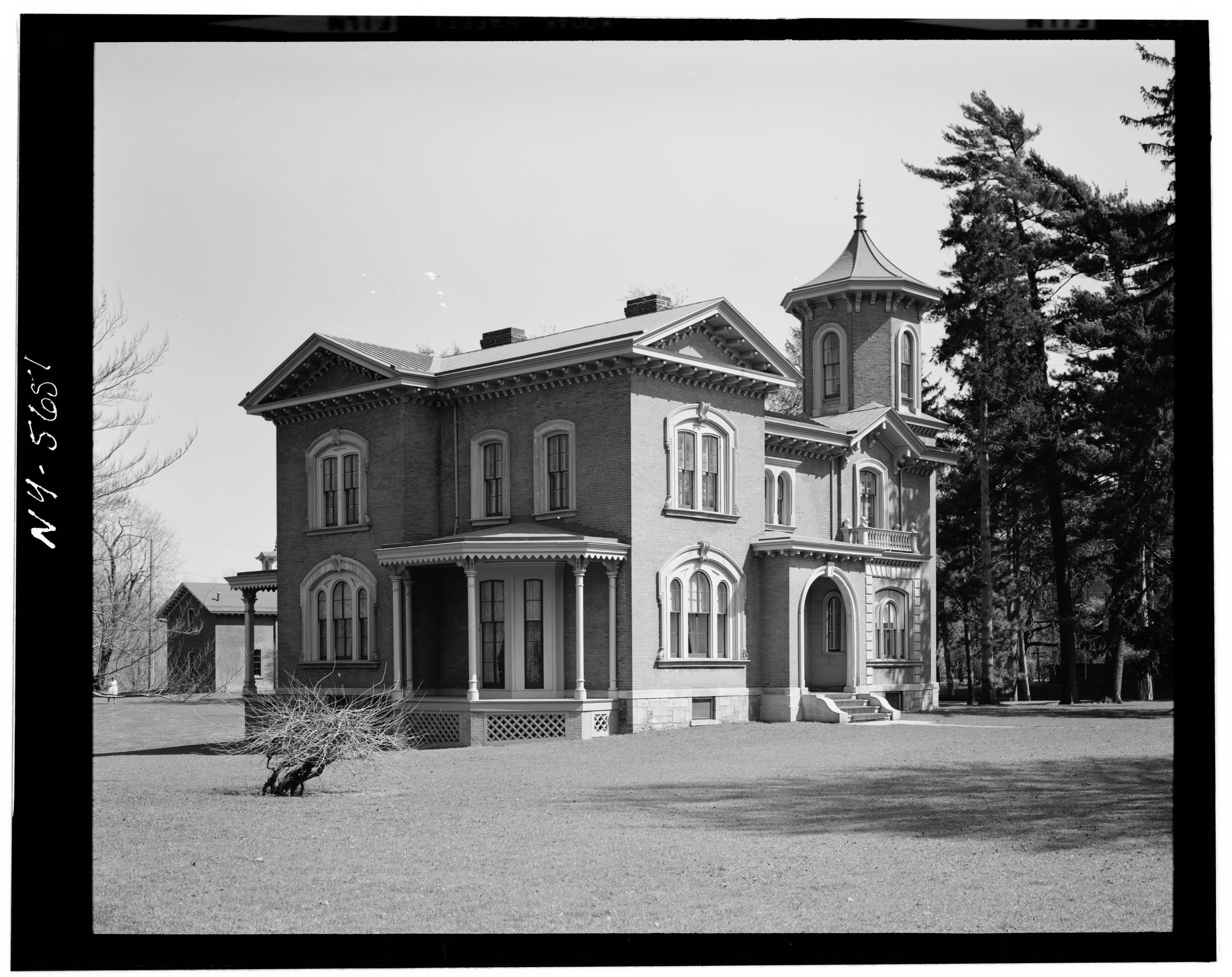
Patrick Barry House

== Bibliography ==
- Home for the people, in suburb and country 1855
- The choice of a dwelling 1871

Renée Tribert and James F. O’Gorman, Gervase Wheeler: A British Architect in America, 1847–1860 (Middletown, CT: Wesleyan University Press, 2012).
