= William Keatinge Clay =

English cleric and antiquary

William Keatinge Clay (1797–1867) was an English cleric and antiquary.

== Biography ==
Clay was born in 1797, and, having been ordained deacon in 1823 by John Fisher, Bishop of Salisbury, became curate of Greenwich. He was ordained priest in the following year by William Howley, Bishop of London. He was curate of Paddington in 1830, and of Blunham, Bedfordshire, in 1834. In 1835 he took the degree of B.D. at Jesus College, Cambridge, as a 'ten-year man'; he became minor canon of Ely Cathedral in 1837, and was subsequently appointed 'prælector theologicus' and librarian of the cathedral. In 1842 he was instituted to the perpetual curacy of Holy Trinity, Ely, and was collated in 1854 by Thomas Turton, bishop of Ely, to the vicarage of Waterbeach, Cambridgeshire, where he died on 26 April 1867.

== Works ==
Clay published several parochial histories, as well as commentaries and editions of Anglican liturgical texts. He also helped in the edition of the Book of Common Prayer issued by the Ecclesiastical History Society in 1849–54, and in the edition of Charles Wheatly's Rational Illustration of the Book of Common Prayer, reprinted in 1858 by the syndics of the Cambridge University Press.

Clay works are:

- Explanatory Notes on the Prayer Book Version of the Psalms, London, 1839, 8vo.
- The Book of Common Prayer illustrated; so as to show its various modifications, the date of its several parts, and the authority on which they rest, London, 1841, 8vo.
- (ed.) Liturgies and Occasional Forms of Prayer set forth in the Reign of Queen Elizabeth, 1847. Edited for the Parker Society.
- An Historical sketch of the Prayer Book, London, 1849, 8vo.
- (ed.) Private Prayers put forth by authority during the Reign of Queen Elizabeth. With an appendix containing the Litany of 1544, Cambridge, 1851. Edited for the Parker Society
- History of the parish of Waterbeach (1859), History of the parish of Landbeach (1861), and History of the parish of Horningsey (1865) in Cambridgeshire. These three parochial histories, printed separately by the Cambridge Antiquarian Society, were collected into one volume with a common title-page, Cambridge, 1865, 8vo.
- A History of the Parish of Milton in the county of Cambridge, edited by the Rev. W. G. Searle for the Cambridge Antiquarian Society, 1869.
