= Henry Bull (theologian) =

Henry Bull (died 1577) was an English Protestant theological writer. He is now remembered as an ally of John Foxe in documenting the Marian exiles and recent religious history.

== Life ==
A native of Warwickshire, Bull was a demy of Magdalen College, Oxford, in 1535, and full fellow and B.A. in 1540. He was a prominent reformer in the college, in a group that included Thomas Cooper, Robert Crowley and John Foxe. He became rector of Courtenhall in early 1553.

When Mary I of England came to the throne later in 1553, Bull, with the help of Thomas Bentham, snatched a censer from the hand of the officiating priest and was expelled from Magdalen. A visitation of the college was held and, on 23 October 1553, the visitors deprived Bull of his fellowship. Anthony Wood says that he went into exile, which cannot be documented, but Strype states that he lived quietly at home as a Protestant.

After the accession of Elizabeth I of England, Bull held benefices, according to Wood. He collected correspondence and manuscripts, that were kept by Emmanuel College, Cambridge, and worked in parallel with Foxe's Actes and Monuments.

== Works ==
Bull edited the Apology of Bishop John Hooper (1562) and, in the same year, Hooper's Exposition of Psalm xxiii. Other commentaries of Hooper's on three psalms appeared in Certeine comfortable Expositions of … Master John Hooper on Psalms 23, 62, 72, 77, gathered by Mr. H. B. (1580). He was also the editor of Christian Praiers and Holy Meditacions which appeared first by 1570; an earlier work from Bull's collection was Lidley's Prayers (1566). Christian Praiers was reprinted later in the century, and by the Parker Society.

The major martyrological collection, Certain Most Godly, Fruitful and Comfortable Letters of such True Saintes and Holy Martyrs as in the Late Bloodye Persecution Gave their Lyves, was published in 1564, as by Miles Coverdale. In effect, it was by Bull.

Bull translated from Martin Luther A Commentarie on the Fiftene Psalmes called Psalmi Graduum, printed by Thomas Vautroullier (1577), with a preface by Foxe.

== Notes ==
Attribution

This article incorporates text from a publication now in the public domain: Stephen, Leslie, ed. (1886). "Bull, Henry". Dictionary of National Biography. Vol. 7. London: Smith, Elder & Co.
