= John Edmund Cox =

John Edmund Cox (1812–1890), also Edmond, was an English cleric and antiquarian, best known as an editor of the works of Thomas Cranmer.

== Life ==
He was the eldest son of John (or George) Cox of Norwich, a furniture maker. In his musical memoirs, Cox wrote about Paganini's 1831 visit to Norwich, lodging with the family. He matriculated at All Souls' College, Oxford in 1832, aged 19, graduating B.A. in 1836, M.A. 1840, B. & D.D. in 1870. He was ordained deacon in 1836, priest in 1837. His first living was Aldeby, from where he moved to St Mary, Southtown, Great Yarmouth.

Elected a Fellow of the Society of Antiquaries of London in 1846, Cox at that time was a curate of St Giles Cripplegate. He was then at St Dunstan's, Stepney, where on 21 February 1847 he preached a sermon "National judgements" on the famine in Ireland: he had published in 1843 a Great Yarmouth sermon under the same title. On this occasion he attributed the higher mortality in West Cork to agrarian and sectarian violence. His views lead Peter Gray to class him as an "ultra-Protestant".

Cox was elected to the Numismatic Society of London in 1847. He became vicar in charge and lecturer of St Helen's, Bishopsgate in 1849.

Cox was Grand Chaplain of Freemasons and chaplain to the Royal Society of Musicians, and he chaired the Poor Clergy Relief Society. He died on 27 October 1890.

== Works ==
For the Parker Society, Cox edited the works of Cranmer in two volumes:

- Writings and Disputations of Thomas Cranmer: Relative to the Sacrament of the Lord's Supper (1844)
- Miscellaneous Writings and Letters of Thomas Cranmer (1846)

The editorial work was complicated by forgeries made by Robert Ware. Cox's work followed the scholarship of the edition by Henry Jenkyns of The Remains of Thomas Cranmer of the 1830s, and was followed by the 1853 edition by Philip Edward Barnes (1815–1860) of the Memorials of the Rev. Thomas Cranmer by John Strype. Harry Culverwell Porter wrote in a 1966 book review that Cox's edition of Cranmer's works was standard, while the edition of Jenkyns published the original version of the Defence of the True and Catholic Doctrine of the Sacrament of the Body and Blood of Christ, of which Cox gave the later version in Latin.

Other works were:

- Bellum Papale by Thomas James (1841), editor
- Treatise on the Corruptions of Scripture, Councils and Fathers by Thomas James (1843), editor
- A Brief Sketch of the Life of the Late Miss Sarah Martin of Great Yarmouth (Yarmouth, 1844) anonymous editor of the memoir of Sarah Martin
- Hermann Olshausen, Biblical Commentary on St. Paul's First and Second Epistles to the Corinthians (1851), translator
- Musical Recollections of the Last Half-Century (1872, 2 vols.). Cox worked as a newspaper music critic, and was a friend of Michael Costa; he was also on good terms with George Thomas Smart. In 1849 he was a recently joined member of the Sacred Harmonic Society. In 1859 he took part in the discussion led by the Society of Arts on the French government's legislation on concert pitch.
- Annals of St. Helen's Bishopsgate (London, 1876), based mainly on The Last Ten Years of the Priory of S. Helen, Bishopsgate (1856) by Thomas Hugo.

Among his works on Freemasonry were:

- Dr. Ashe's Manual and Lectures
- The Ancient Constitutions of the Order

Cox wrote much for the Church of England Quarterly Review and North British Review. He edited the second edition (1845) of George Townsend's polemical Accusations of History Against the Church of Rome (1825).

== Family ==
Cox married in 1844 Emily Clara Pittman, daughter of John Pittman. The barrister Hugh Bertram Cox (1861–1930) was their son. With his sister Clara L. E. Cox, who contributed the footnotes, he edited Leaves from the Journals of Sir George Smart (1907).
