= Henry Boody House =

Historic house in Maine, United States

- U.S. National Register of Historic Places
- U.S. Historic district – Contributing property
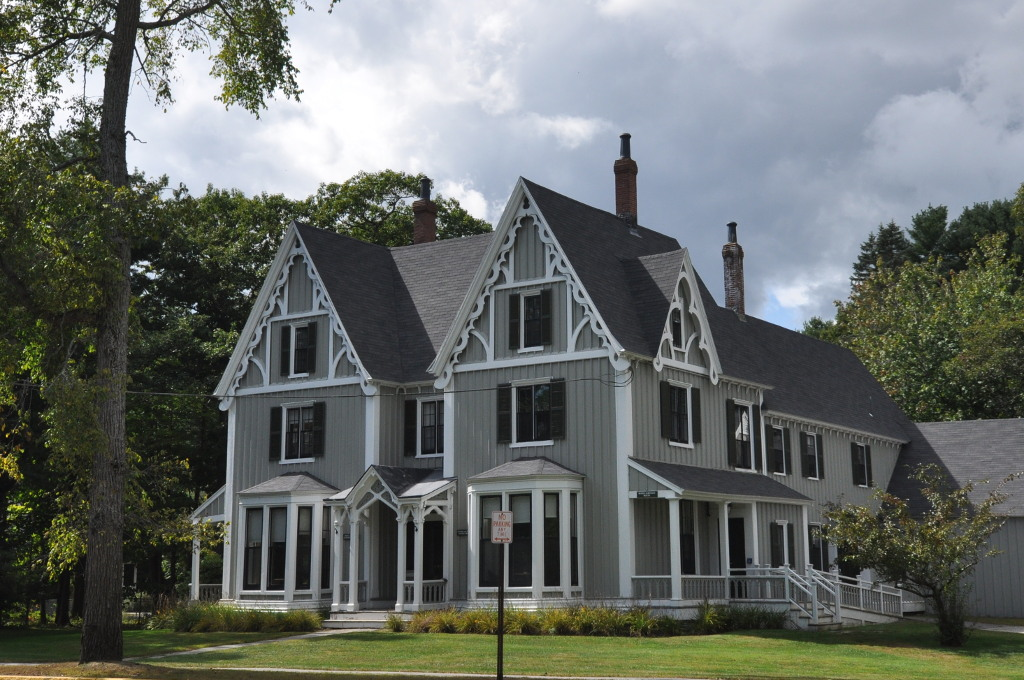

- Location within Maine Location within the United States
- Location: 256 Maine Street, Brunswick, Maine
- Coordinates: 43°54′25″N 69°57′57″W
- Built: 1849
- Architect: Gervase Wheeler
- Architectural style: Gothic Revival
- Part of: Federal Street Historic District (ID76000092)
- NRHP reference No.: 75000094

Significant dates
- Added to NRHP: 1975
- Designated CP: October 29, 1976

The Henry Boody House also known as the Boody-Johnson House, is an historic house at 256 Maine Street in Brunswick, Maine, United States. Built in 1849, it is an important early example of Gothic Revival Architecture, whose design was published by Andrew Jackson Downing in 1850 and received wide notice. It was listed on the National Register of Historic Places on 1975.

== Description and history ==
The Boody House is located south of downtown Brunswick and opposite the main Bowdoin College Campus at the northwest corner of Maine and Boody Streets. The house's main block has a roughly H-shaped configuration, with a pair of projecting gabled sections joined by a central section with a roof ridge perpendicular to the others. It is 2 1/2 stories in height, with board-and-batten siding and a granite foundation. The street-facing gables have identical Gothic trim in the gables, and single-story projecting window bays. A gable-roofed porch with Stick style decoration projects slightly from the narrow center section, and shed-roof porches extend across the sides of the main block. An ell extends to the rear, joining the house to a carriage barn.

The house was built in 1849 for Henry Hill Boody, Professor of Rhetoric and Oratory at Bowdoin College in Brunswick from 1845 to 1854. It cost $6,000 to build the house and purchase the land. Boody sold the property in 1870. It then passed through several hands before being purchased by Bowdoin Professor Henry Johnson in 1877. When Johnson died, the property passed to his oldest daughter, Helen Johnson Chase, who was married to Bowdoin Professor Stanley P. Chase. The property is now owned by Bowdoin College.

The house was designed in 1848 by Gervase Wheeler, an English architect whose work reflected a growing architectural aesthetic to externalize aspects of a building's construction, exemplified here by the use of vertical board-and-batten siding. Wheeler's design was published in Andrew Jackson Downing's 1850 work The Architecture of Country Houses, an influential work in popularizing the Carpenter Gothic style. The house is also regarded as an important precursor of the Stick style, which followed the Gothic Revival.

== See also ==
- National Register of Historic Places listings in Cumberland County, Maine
