= Rockwood Hall =

Gilded Age mansion in Mount Pleasant, New York

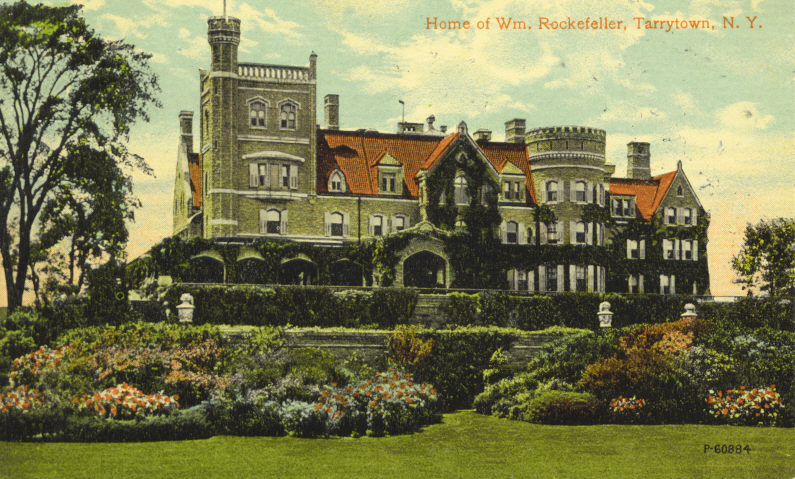
- Hand-colored photograph of the east facade
- Interactive map highlighting the location of Rockwood Hall
- 41°06′47″N 73°51′58″W
- Location: Mount Pleasant, New York

History
- Built: 1849
- Original use: Private residence
- Demolished: 1941–1942

Site notes
- Elevation: 150 feet (46 m)
- Architect(s): Gervase Wheeler; Ebenezer L. Roberts; Carrère and Hastings
- Architectural style: Elizabethan style
- Current use: State park
- Owner: New York State

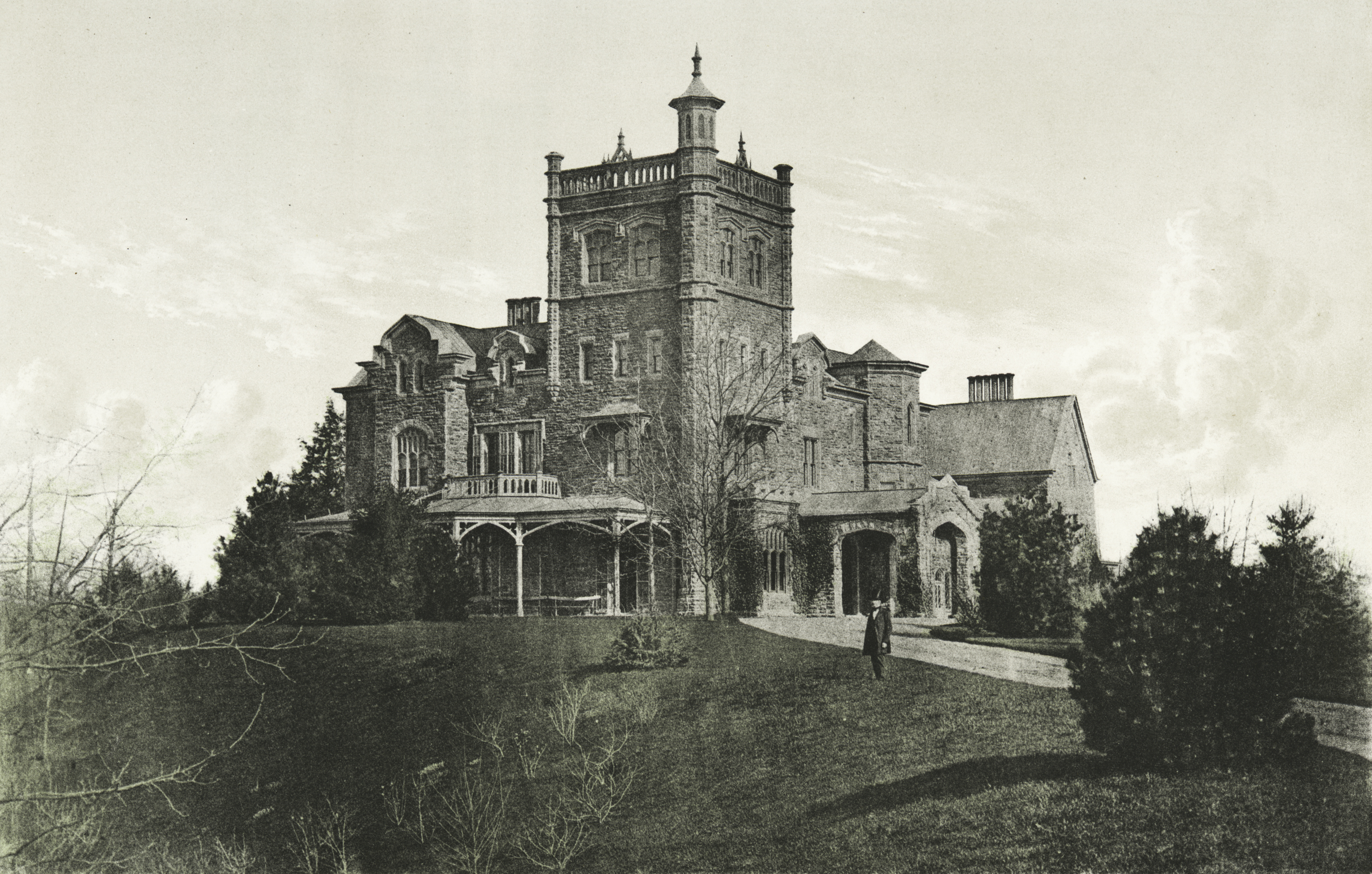
The mansion c. 1860, before Rockefeller's extensive renovations

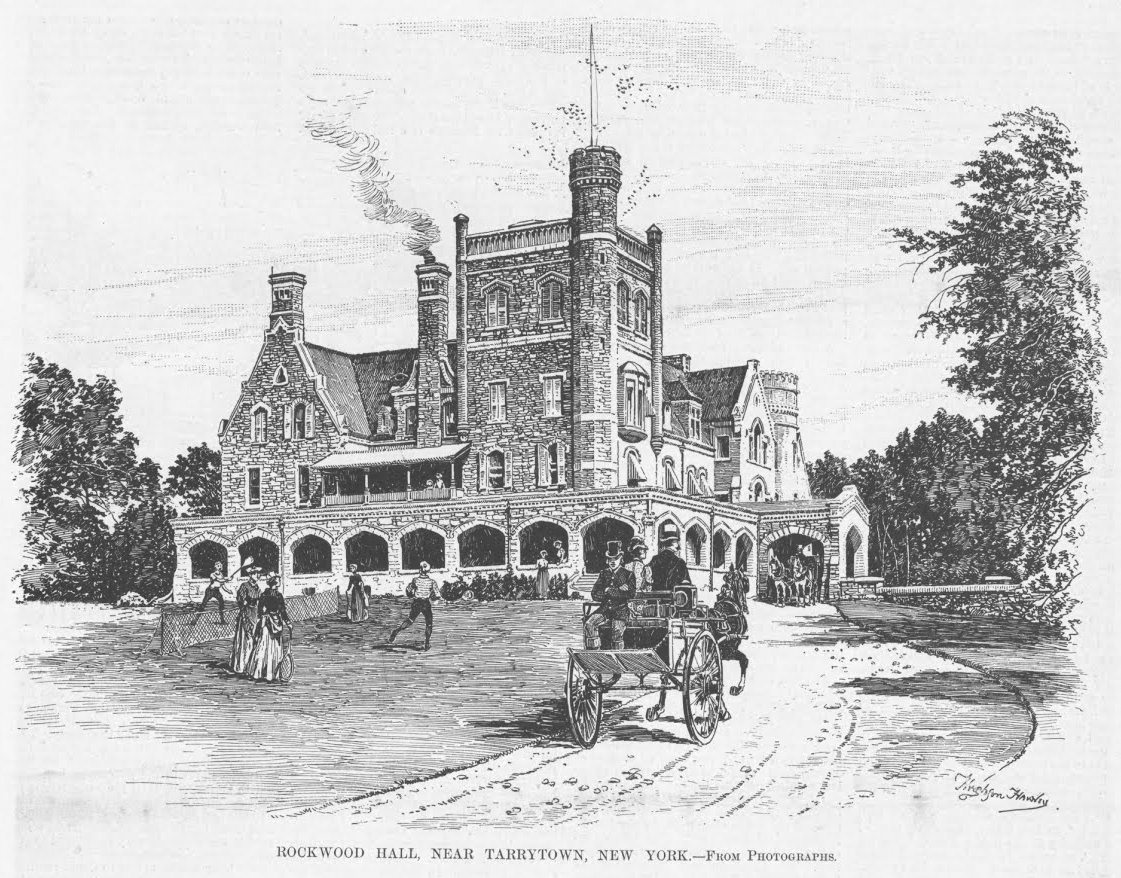
The mansion in 1890, after his renovations

Rockwood Hall was a Gilded Age mansion in Mount Pleasant, New York, on the Hudson River. It was best known as the home of William Rockefeller, brother of John D. Rockefeller. Both brothers were co-founders of the Standard Oil Company. Other owners of the house or property included Alexander Slidell MacKenzie, William Henry Aspinwall, and Lloyd Aspinwall. The property was once up to 1,000 acres (400 ha) in size; the mansion at its height had 204 rooms, making it the second-largest private house in the U.S. at the time, only behind the Biltmore mansion in North Carolina. The estate is currently an 88-acre (36 ha) section of the Rockefeller State Park Preserve.

Among the first people to live on the property was Alexander Slidell Mackenzie, who lived there from 1840 to 1848. Edwin Bartlett, a wealthy merchant, subsequently purchased the site and hired Gervase Wheeler to design a house on the property, which was constructed in 1849. By 1860, Bartlett sold the house to William Henry Aspinwall, who lived there until 1875; his son Lloyd lived at the house until 1886. William Rockefeller purchased the estate and likely extensively renovated the house and property, hiring the firm Carrère and Hastings for interior renovations. Rockefeller died there in 1922, and his heirs sold it to investors, who turned the house and property into Rockwood Hall Country Club. The club became bankrupt in 1936, after which it became the Washington Irving Country Club. By 1940, the property lay empty again, so its owner John D. Rockefeller Jr. had most of the property's buildings razed, including the mansion. In late 1946, the Rockwood Hall property was proposed for the location of the United Nations headquarters. John Jr.'s son Laurance Rockefeller sold some of the property to IBM in 1970. IBM's property was later bought by New York Life, followed by Regeneron Pharmaceuticals, the current owner. The remaining property was sold to New York State at a significantly reduced price to become parkland within Rockefeller State Park.

== History ==
=== Early history ===
One of the early owners of the property was Alexander Slidell Mackenzie, who lived in a farmhouse there from 1840 until his death in 1848. Commodore Matthew C. Perry was accustomed to spending part of the summer with his wife in cottages near Mackenzie's farm. In 1839, Perry purchased a neighboring parcel and built a stone house, named The Moorings. They settled into this home as a year-round residence with their children. Around 1853 or 1854, Perry sold the country estate and moved back to New York City.

Importer and merchant Edwin Bartlett obtained the property around 1848, demolished the farmhouse, and built Rockwood, an English Gothic castle of locally quarried stone. Bartlett hired Gervase Wheeler to design the house, which was built in 1849.

Architectural sketch of Rockwood's central hall, with renovations by Carrère and Hastings

Bartlett sold the house to his business partner William Henry Aspinwall in 1860; Aspinwall made it his summer home and improved the property and house, and purchased enough land to make his estate 200 acres (81 ha). Aspinwall would often travel from New York City to the property via his yacht Firefly, which he could moor to his dock at Rockwood Hall.

Upon his death in 1875, his son Lloyd Aspinwall lived there until his own death, in 1886. William Avery Rockefeller Jr. then purchased it for $150,000. His residence in Mount Pleasant persuaded his brother, John D. Rockefeller, to build his estate Kykuit in nearby Pocantico Hills.

Rockefeller expanded his property to about 1,000 acres (400 ha) and either renovated or rebuilt the castle, nearly doubling its size. Some sources, including Rockefeller himself, claim he entirely rebuilt the house, and used the old stone to construct a new barn or stables.

Including Rockefeller's purchase of the property, he spent about $3 million ($108 million in 2025) on the house. He spared no expense in making it fit his characteristics and lifestyle, and even had little idea how much he would spend on it during its construction. Rockefeller hired Ebenezer L. Roberts to oversee the construction, though Roberts died in 1890, during the house's renovation. He also hired noted architectural firm Carrère and Hastings to create plans for interior renovation of the house. Rockefeller also spent $6,000 to repave a 2-mile (3.2 km) stretch of road with macadam from the Vanderbilt Shepard home Woodlea to Sleepy Hollow Cemetery. Rockefeller paid for the paving in order to travel easily from Rockwood Hall to the Tarrytown railroad station.

The resulting 204-room house was 174 by 104 feet (53 m × 32 m) and was the second-largest private house in the U.S. at the time, only behind the Biltmore mansion in Asheville, North Carolina. It was estimated at the time as second only to the Biltmore in cost as well, and as second to Kykuit in its extent of land and value, within Westchester County.

Rockefeller moved into the newly renovated house around May 1890. In 1895, Rockefeller's daughter Emma married David Hunter McAlpin Jr., son of David Hunter McAlpin in a ceremony at the house. Much of the house was decorated for the event. In 1914, during the Colorado Coalfield War, the Rockefeller brothers' properties of Rockwood Hall and Kykuit were the site of rioting and potential home invasion. Tarrytown village president Frank Pierson protected the homes, gathering more police and leading the effort to suppress the rioters and drive them away from the homes.

Rockefeller intended the house to be his summer retreat, yet in his later years it became his year-round home. In 1922, Rockefeller died within Rockwood Hall, leaving the property empty. His funeral took place in Rockwood Hall, with a service by the rector of Saint Mary's Episcopal Church, which Rockefeller regularly attended. The gates of the estate were closed and guarded by policemen during the affair.

=== As country club ===
Rockefeller's heirs put the property up for sale, however no individual buyer could be found. At this point, the mansion was closed, its furnishings were removed, and about 20 caretakers were tending to the property. The first breakup of his property was a sale to Frank Vanderlip. In 1924, Vanderlip purchased 57 acres (23 ha) of Rockwood Hall's riverfront property to add to his estate, Beechwood. The bulk of the estate was purchased that same year by a group of investors, who formed Rockwood Hall, Inc. Their company purchased the property (with 210 acres (85 ha) west of Route 9 and 600 acres (240 ha) east) for around $1 million. The group converted the estate into a country club with a golf course, a swimming pool, and other facilities. The company formed Rockwood Hall Country Club and took out a mortgage with the Equitable Trust Company of New York, which was acquired by Chase Bank in 1930. Its 18-hole golf course was designed by Emmet & Tull in 1929. Rockwood Hall Country Club hired noted Australian golfer Joe Kirkwood Sr. to be the club's first golf professional.

In 1927, Rockefeller's nephew John D. Rockefeller Jr. purchased 450 acres (180 ha) across Route 9 from Rockwood. In the following year, the Rockwood Hall club sold 166.5 acres (67.4 ha) of its own land east of Route 9 to John Jr., in order to settle or reduce two of its mortgages. By 1928, the club was profitable enough to plan to expand its property; the club planned for a second golf course on an adjacent property, as well as adjustments to most of its existing course and construction of four tennis courts and an outdoor pool. In the same year, Frederic N. Gilbert was removed as a member of the country club for allegedly trying to obtain control of it. Frank Harris Hitchcock was President of the club at the time, and had been the club's first president. Gilbert took legal action against the club.

The Rockwood Hall club was building up debts, especially during the Great Depression, which began in 1929. The club was ultimately not financially successful, and declared bankruptcy in 1936. During the summer of 1937, Rockwood Hall Country Club leased the house and grounds to the Washington Irving Country Club and the coachhouse and stable to the Washington Irving Theater during Rockwood's foreclosure suit. The coachhouse and stable were remodeled and began showing summer productions beginning in 1938 and ending by 1940.

=== Demolition ===
Chase National Bank had acquired Rockwood's mortgage and began foreclosing on the property. In 1938, John Jr. purchased Rockwood Hall Country Club and its 220 acres (89 ha) from Chase Bank for $244,374 in bankruptcy court. By 1941, John Jr. found no use for the site and its buildings were deteriorating severely, so he prepared to demolish the buildings. In late 1941 and early 1942, John Jr. ordered the demolition of the mansion, coachhouse, greenhouses, powerhouse, barn, chicken house, pigeonhouse, sheds, and boathouse; only excluding the two gatehouses. Debris was to be dumped into the Hudson River, and care was taken to not damage the property's retaining walls, trees, shrubs, roads, and terraces. The last remaining structures are the gatehouse on U.S. Route 9 and the terraced foundation of the mansion.

=== Property redevelopment ===
Rockefeller Jr. deeded Rockwood Hall to his son Laurance Rockefeller on April 8, 1946. Later that year, the property was proposed for the location of the United Nations headquarters. It was one of a few proposals for the site, and was given by Laurance and Nelson Rockefeller for free. Officials of Westchester County had previously proposed the same site. Their father, John Jr., was cautious about the proposal, believing that the site's occupancy would prompt the UN's expansion onto other Rockefeller properties nearby in Pocantico Hills, and possibly even Kykuit, the family's seat. Laurance and Nelson, along with their brothers David and John, were all willing to give up their estates to make the site location possible. John Jr. expressed that the nature of the countryside in Westchester would be irrevocably changed. He instructed Nelson to inquire further about another proposed site near White Plains, New York, and to see about additional available land near Rockwood. Another reason given for John Jr.'s disapproval of the site was its distance from airports and other transportation available in New York City.

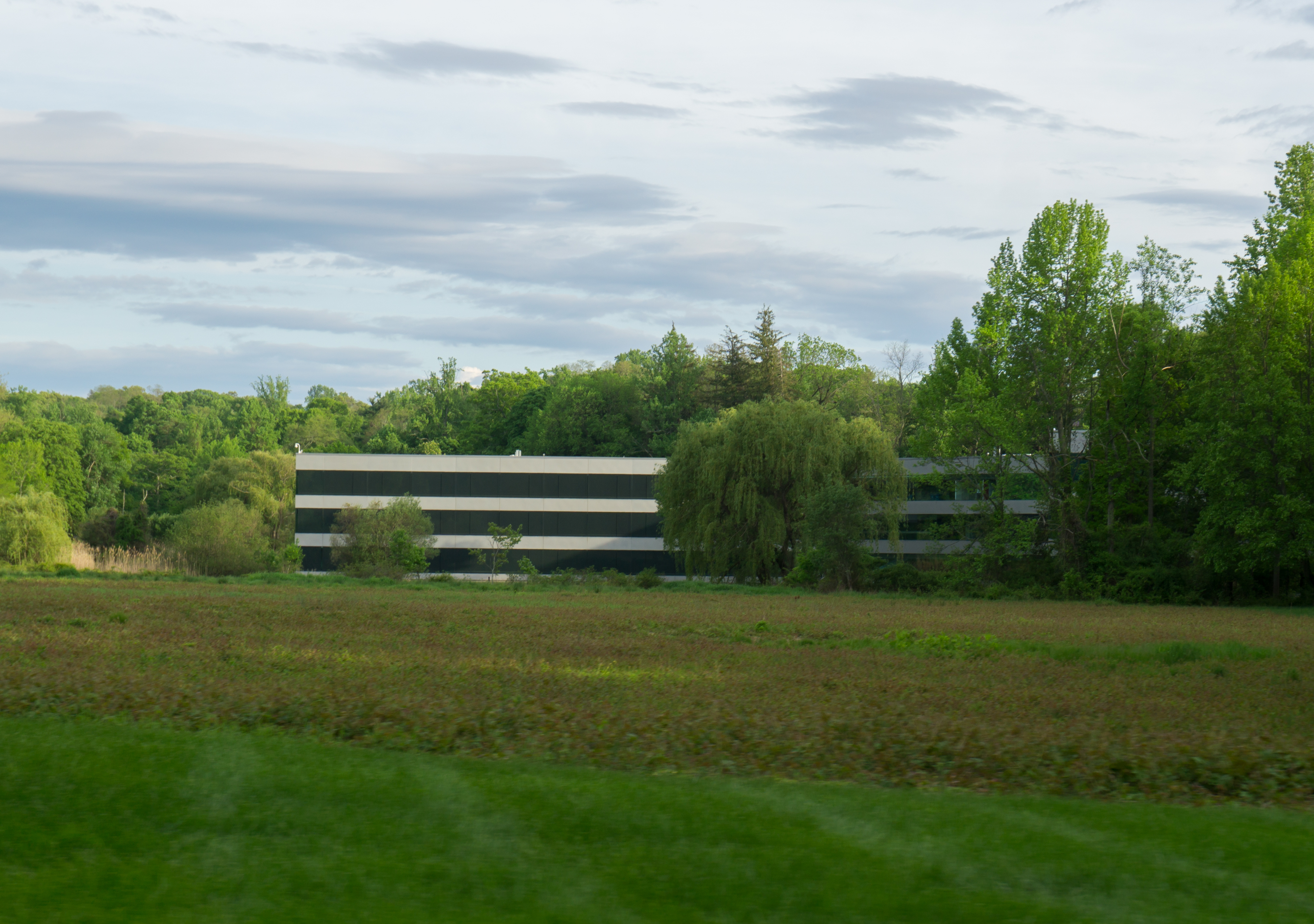
Originally owned by IBM for their World Trade Division. Sold to New York Life and now the Regeneron DNA Learning Center campus.

Laurance sold 80 acres (32 ha) of the property to IBM in 1970 for the development of the IBM World Trade/Americas Building; the stipulation being that the building not be tall or seen from the main estate. A low, four-story corporate headquarters with reflecting pool and fish pond was designed by Architect Edward Larrabee Barnes and Associates. New York Life later operated out of the site. Most recently, biotech company Regeneron purchased the property for the DNA Learning Center(DNALC Building).

Laurance had planned to donate Rockwood Hall to New York State, and made the IBM sale to offset the loss of tax revenue to the town of Mount Pleasant. During Laurance's ownership of the remaining land, he made the space available to the public for hiking, fishing, and other recreation.

From the early 1970s until 1998, Laurance Rockefeller leased the estate to New York for use as a public park, at a cost of $1 a year, and he covered the maintenance costs of the property. In 1972, he announced he would donate the land to the state. Plans for the public park were to possibly include a center for studying the Hudson River environment. In the meantime, the state commissioned a study of the river around the property, the Rockefellers granted walking tours for 540 residents, and gave them questionnaires to them to gauge reactions. Developers were commissioned to give opinions; the first developers proposed a swimming pool, skating rink, and tennis courts to allow for high-density use of the parkland. Residents indicated on the questionnaires that they preferred passive use of the park: walking trails and a nature center, and no camping or sporting facilities. The project manager proposed a landscaped platform above the Hudson Line tracks, to allow residents direct access to the Hudson River.

In 1998, Rockefeller gave the 88-acre (36 ha) property to the Laurance S. Rockefeller Fund, with half of the fund's interest donated to New York State and half to Memorial Sloan Kettering Cancer Center. At the time, the land was one of few large undeveloped tracts left on the lower Hudson River. New York State subsequently purchased Memorial Sloan Kettering's portion (appraised at $26.8 million) in order to fully own Rockwood Hall.

== Architecture ==
=== Exterior ===
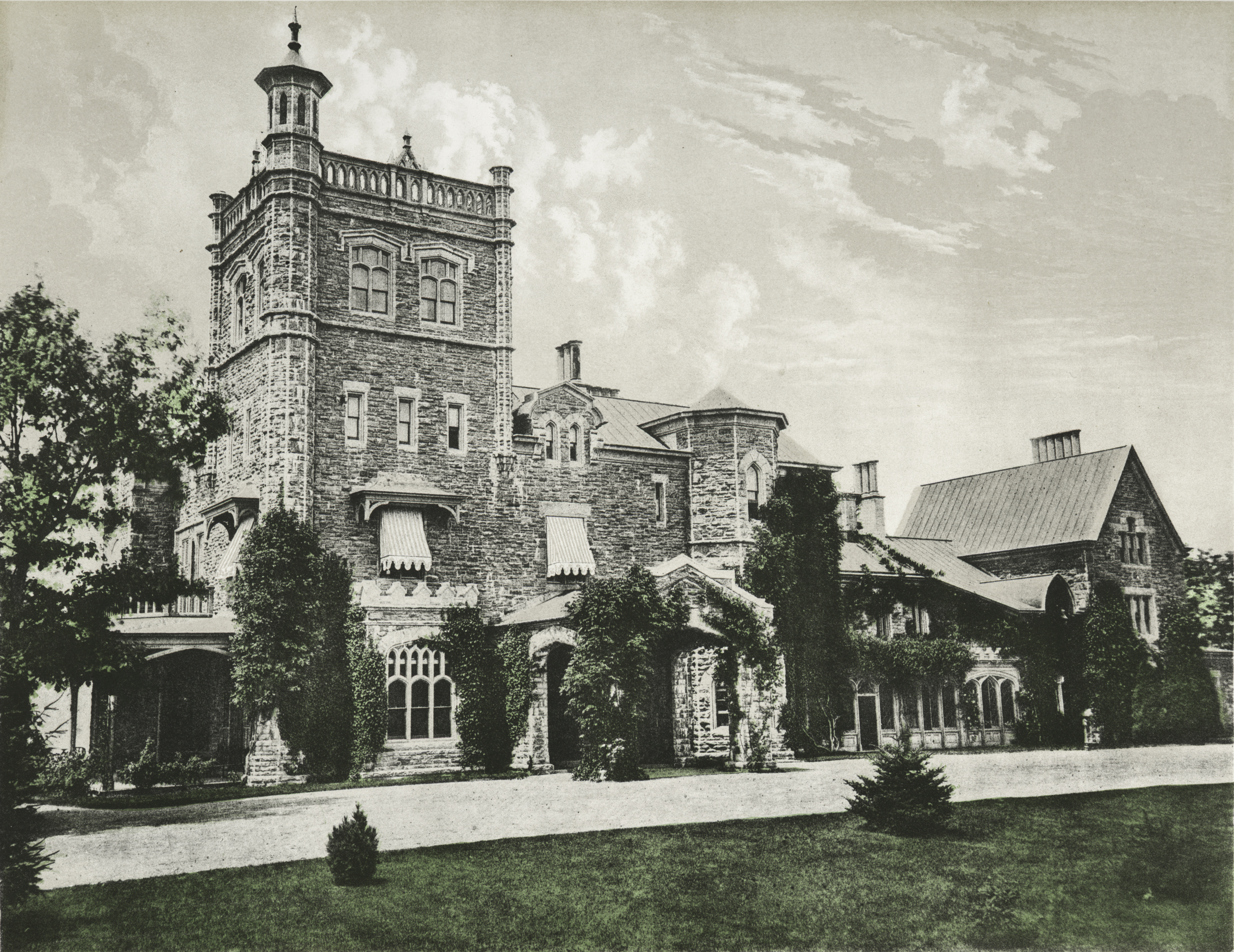
The house's exterior under Aspinwall's ownership, 1860

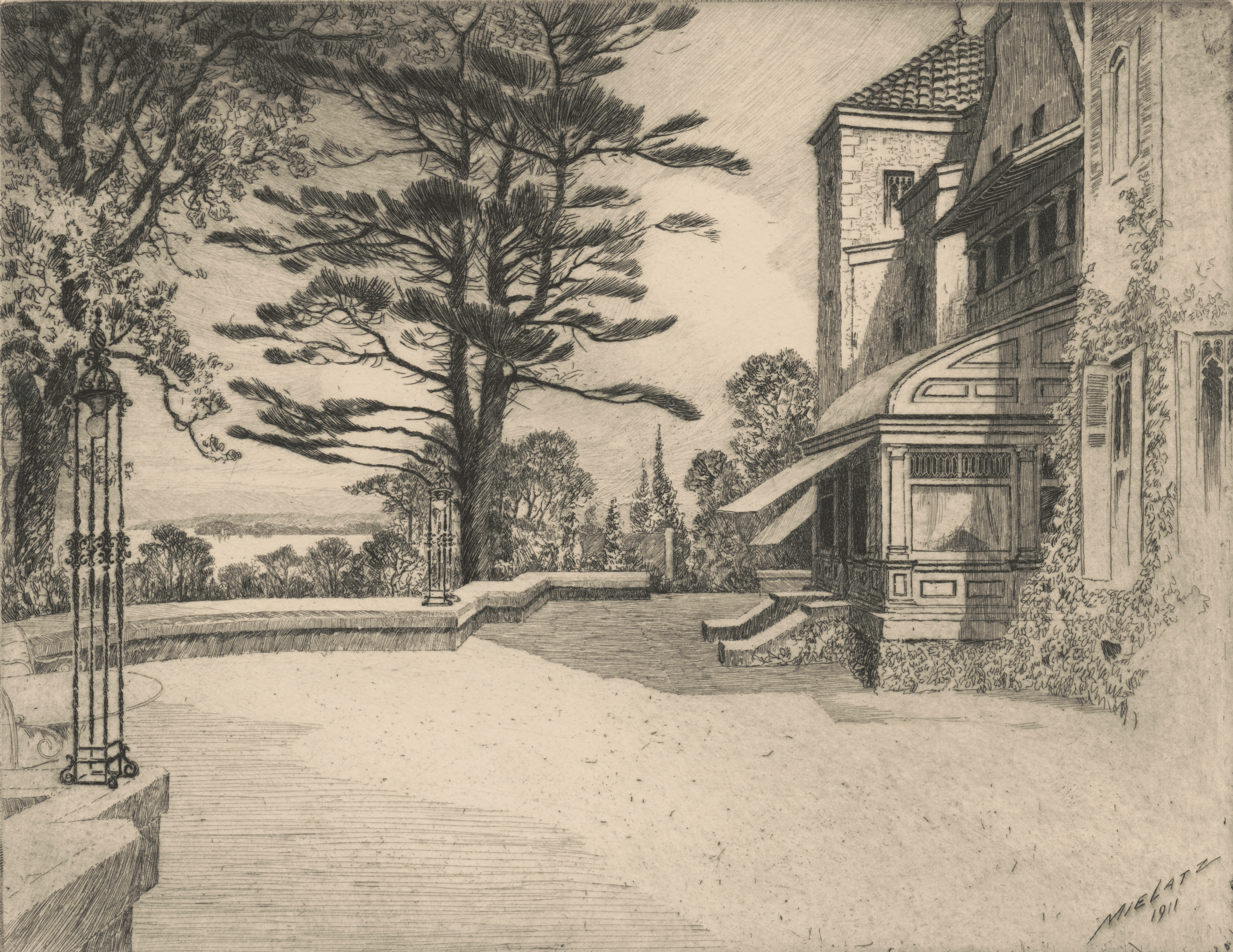
Illustration of the western terrace, facing the Hudson River

The house was 500 feet (150 m) east of the Hudson River and 150 feet (46 m) above it. The building was designed in the castellated Elizabethan style. Under Rockefeller's ownership, the house had dimensions of 174 by 104 feet. Its exterior walls were of massive blocks of rough grey gneiss from quarries in Hastings-on-Hudson, and its interior walls were brick. Its exterior walls were 3.5 feet (1.1 m) thick by the foundation and 2 feet (0.61 m) thick at the upper floors, and were all built on bedrock. The interior walls ran from the cellar to the roof.

The building was described as resembling a Scottish castle, related to the Rockefellers' Scottish lineage. The house had two walled terraces at its base, one of which was used as a tennis court; the other was used at the front of the house for the roadway, while the back facing the river was laid with a mosaic. It also had a wide and stone-roofed veranda surrounding the house. Its architectural decorations included towers, turrets, and ported parapets. It was built prominently on a hill, on the highest point of the estate by skilled laborers from Scotland.

The house had an asymmetrical scheme, with a square main portion and an L-shaped servants' wing extending north from the main house. The main portion had three stories and an attic.

The house had a four-story tower at the southeast corner, which originally had a two-and-a-half-story octagonal tower next to it, with the porte-cochère lying between them. The house originally only had verandas around the major living spaces.

The roof was tiled with fire-brick painted red, and had a gilded weather vane.

The main entrance was on the north side, under a porte-cochère. The doors were massive and made of intricately carved oak.

=== Interior ===
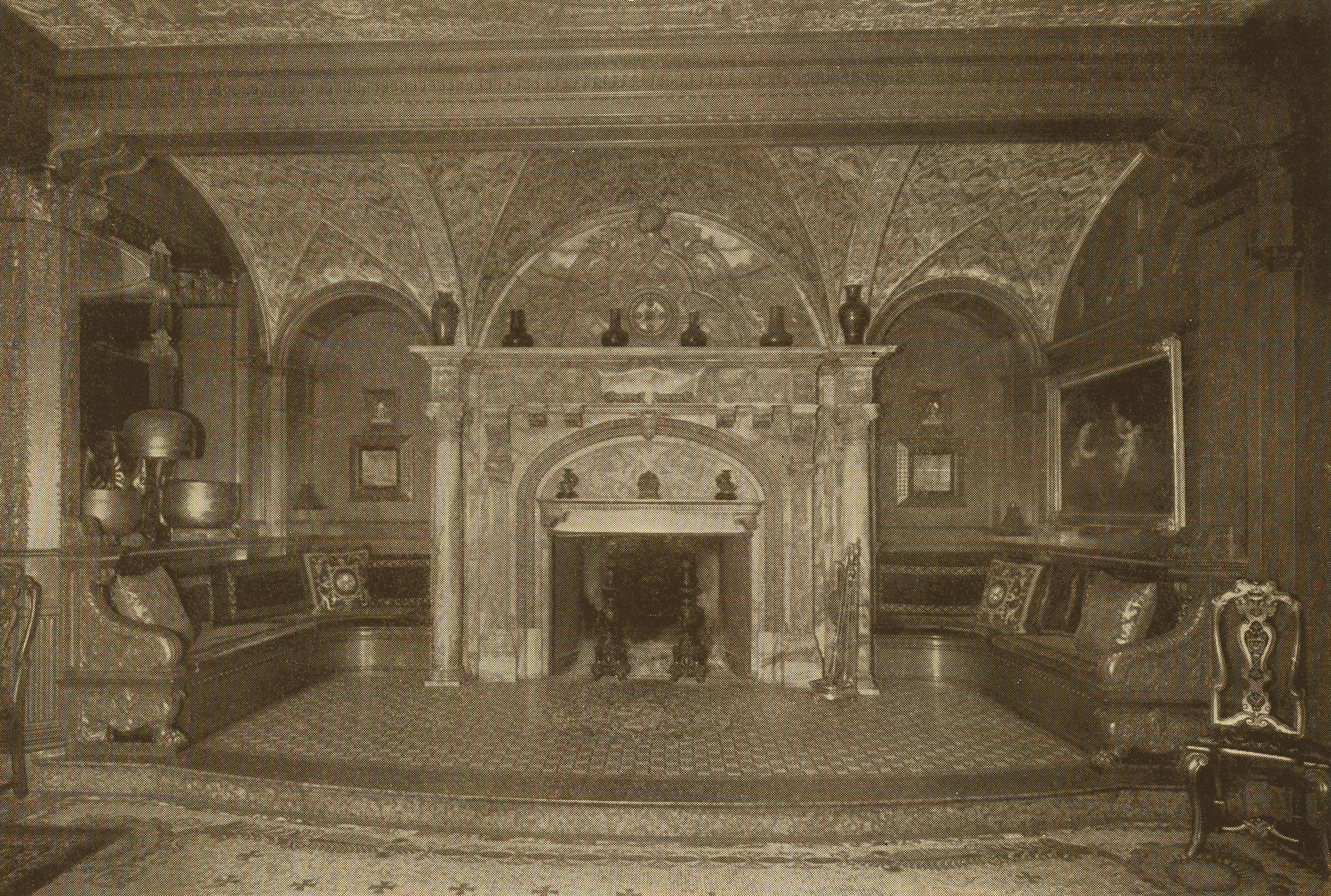
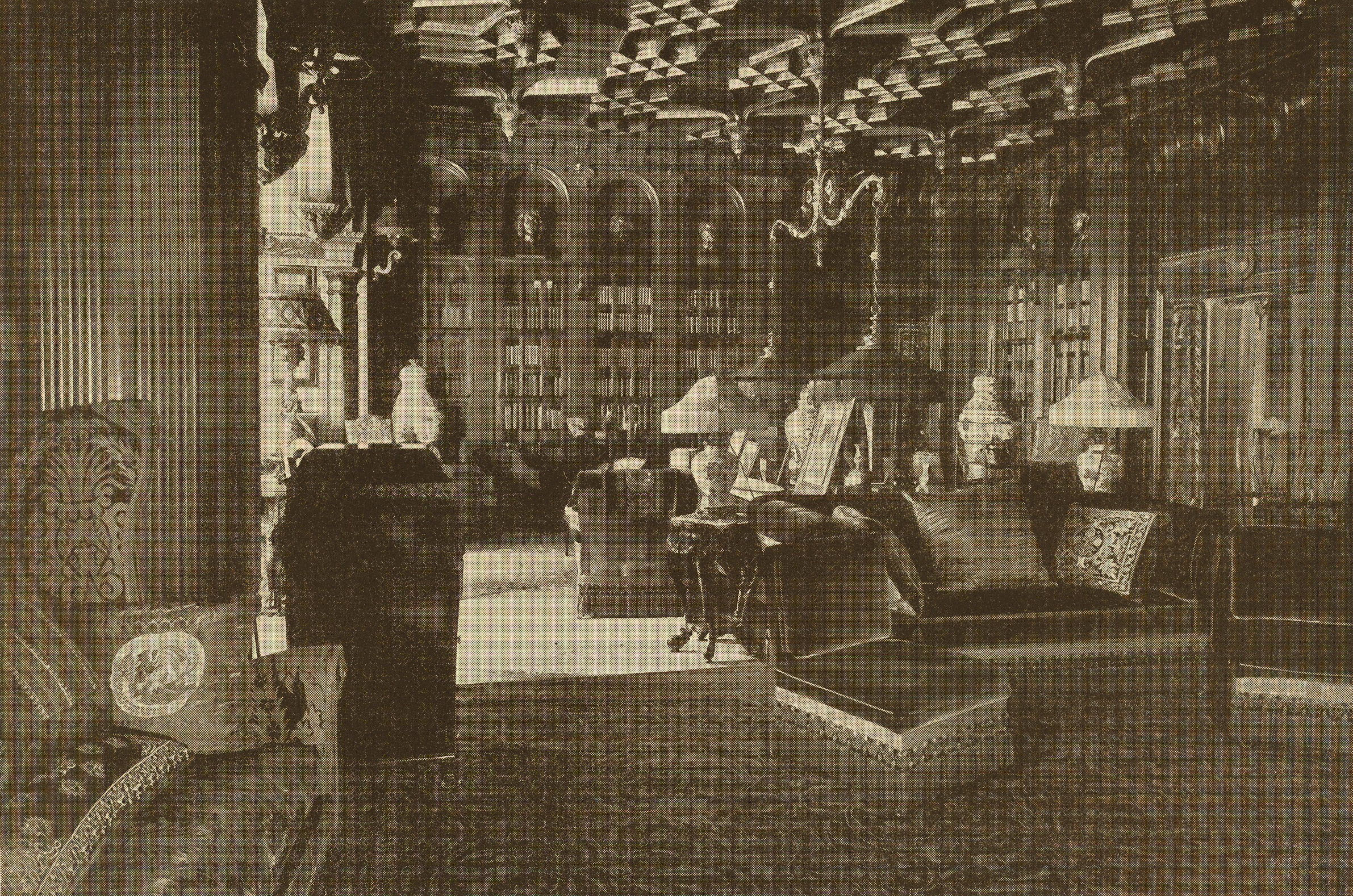
The main hall and library

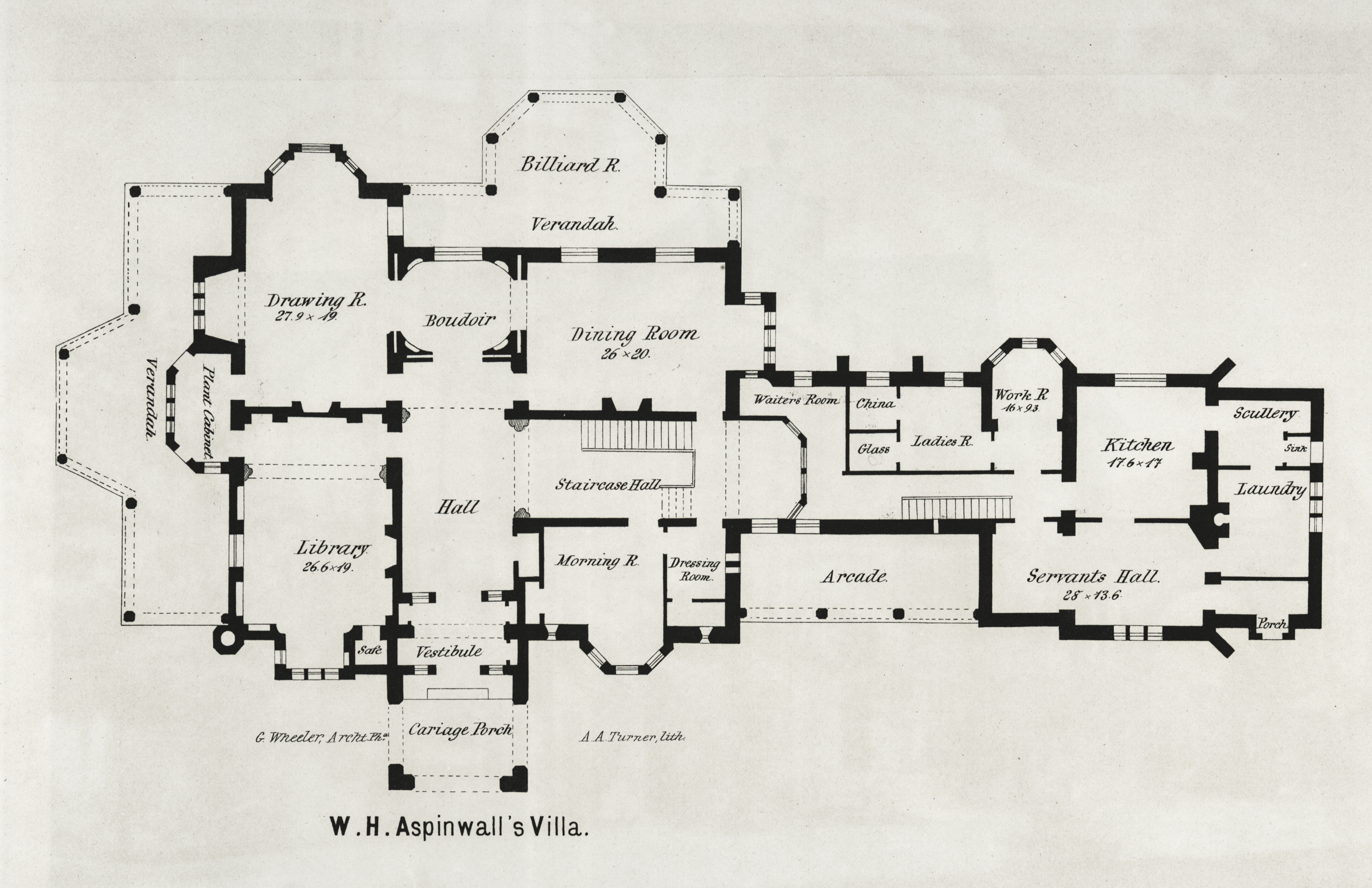
Floorplan of the original first floor, 1860

The interior had 204 rooms, altogether containing 21 fireplaces. The first floor consisted of the entrance hall, a drawing room, library, music room, dining room, breakfast room, billiard room, conservatory, guest dressing room, and study. Two of the house's entrances laid at the western and eastern ends of a hall transversing the house; another hall ran from the north end to the south end. These halls had mosaic floors, walls wainscoted in American oak, and papier-mâché ceilings with a series of domes, each fitted with five electric chandeliers. At the intersection of the two halls was the main staircase to the top floor, making three turns between each floor. The balustrade was made of American oak. Immediately above the staircase was a dome of cathedral glass, while at each half-flight of stairs was a loggia made entirely of tile, separated from the main house by glass, and opening upward to the air.

The main entrance was at the north side of the house, by the porte-cochère. This led into a vestibule decorated with mosaics and walled in polished marble, with carved onyx. Past this was the main hall, with American oak walls, a papier mache ceiling, and a carved oak bench between two large carved pillars. It also had a large fireplace of bright orange and white mosaic tiles, with designs of Italian eagles and foliage, and a circular hearthstone 20 feet (6.1 m) in diameter. Sunk into the wall to the left and right of the fireplace was a pair of corner seats. To the right of the main hall was a bathroom and coatroom. To its right was the reception room, a room with stained-glass windows, dark mahogany woodwork with inlaid maple, a mosaic-faced fireplace with a mantle of African onyx, and a carved mahogany mantelpiece with carved cherubs supporting a round mirror. The ceiling was gold and the walls were frescoed. Seven electric chandeliers lit the space.

The music room, next to the reception room, was colored a delicate green enamel. The walls were paneled satinwood, the ceiling was papier-mâché, and the fireplace was of Pyrian marble, with a small square window above. The room was lit by 250 electric lamps scattered throughout the room in "artistic carelessness". The library, in the southeast corner of the house, used Circassian walnut wainscoting all the way to the ceiling. The fireplace was of black Levantine marble. Carved oaken chairs were throughout the room. The library was described as dark and sombre as opposed to the light and airy music room, an example of how nearly all of the house's rooms were distinct from the adjoining rooms. The dining room and library opened out onto the south veranda and terrace. The dining room was mahogany, wainscoted almost to the ceiling. The walls were covered with oil paintings. The fireplace was of Siena marble, and a sideboard was of mahogany. The billiard room, in the southwest corner, had a frescoed domed ceiling and a fireplace of light-hued onyx. The breakfast room, in the northeast corner, had wainscoted gum-wood walls, with space between the wainscoting and ceiling featuring inscribed phrases. The ceiling was azure blue, with emblems of the zodiac in gold. The den nearby had red birch walls and ceiling and a painted frieze, along with a yellow tiled fireplace.

The house's second and third floors were dedicated to sleeping space, together containing 14 bedrooms. The second floor had five large bedrooms with attached bathrooms and two small bedrooms with attached bathrooms, with fireplaces in each bedroom and the hall. The third floor had six large bedrooms with attached bathrooms, and one bedroom with a separate bath. The third floor shared the same layout of fireplaces. Each bedroom had walls of different kinds of wood, with different designs and frescoes throughout. The attic above the third floor was finished in plain white woodwork, and had about 12 rooms for servants. The servant's wing also contained 15 bedrooms. The round tower contained a smoking room, while the square tower contained a sewing room.

The house was heated by hot air through floorboard vents. Electric buttons in the rooms were used to ring electric bells, to call servants. Two Otis elevators ran from the cellar to the attic: one for servants and freight and one elegant elevator for the family and guests. The house was fireproof, such that a fire within a room, with all doors closed, would not spread. As well, the servants' wing was divided from the house by a heavy brick and stone wall to prevent spread of fire. All doors in the house, except those at the main entrance, slid to close. The floors were of highly polished inlaid American oak.

== Grounds ==
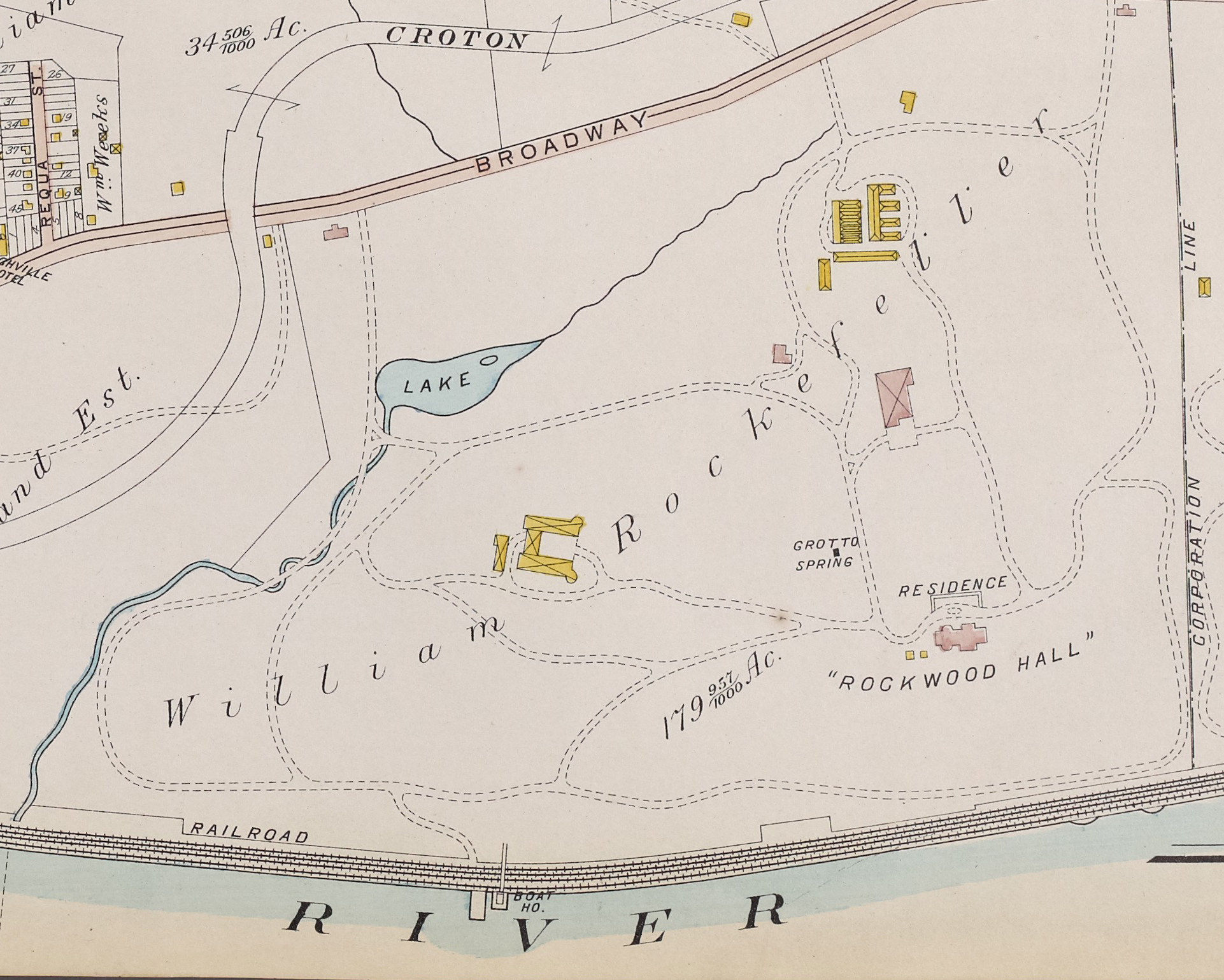
Map of Rockefeller's immediate property holdings at Rockwood

The property is located in the town of Mount Pleasant, in Westchester County, New York. It lies west of U.S. Route 9, then known as Broadway, and 3 miles (4.8 km) north of Tarrytown and 1.5 miles (2.4 km) south of Scarborough. It was less than 1-mile (1.6 km) from Sleepy Hollow Country Club. The property borders railroad tracks, formerly of the New York Central Railroad and today as Metro-North's Hudson Line. The property also borders the Hudson River for 3/4 mile (1.2 km). The lawns and gardens spanned 26 acres (11 ha) of the property. Corrugated iron fences on concrete fenced off part of the property. During William Rockefeller's ownership, the property was within the tax district of Tarrytown; the current park property extends nearly the entire riverfront from Sleepy Hollow to Briarcliff Manor, and from the Hudson River to Route 9.

The mansion's facades were decorated with large pots of tropical plants. To one side of the house, several acres were devoted to pastures for Southdown sheep, described as William Rockefeller's pets. Another pasture held Jersey cattle for production of milk and butter for the mansion and servants.

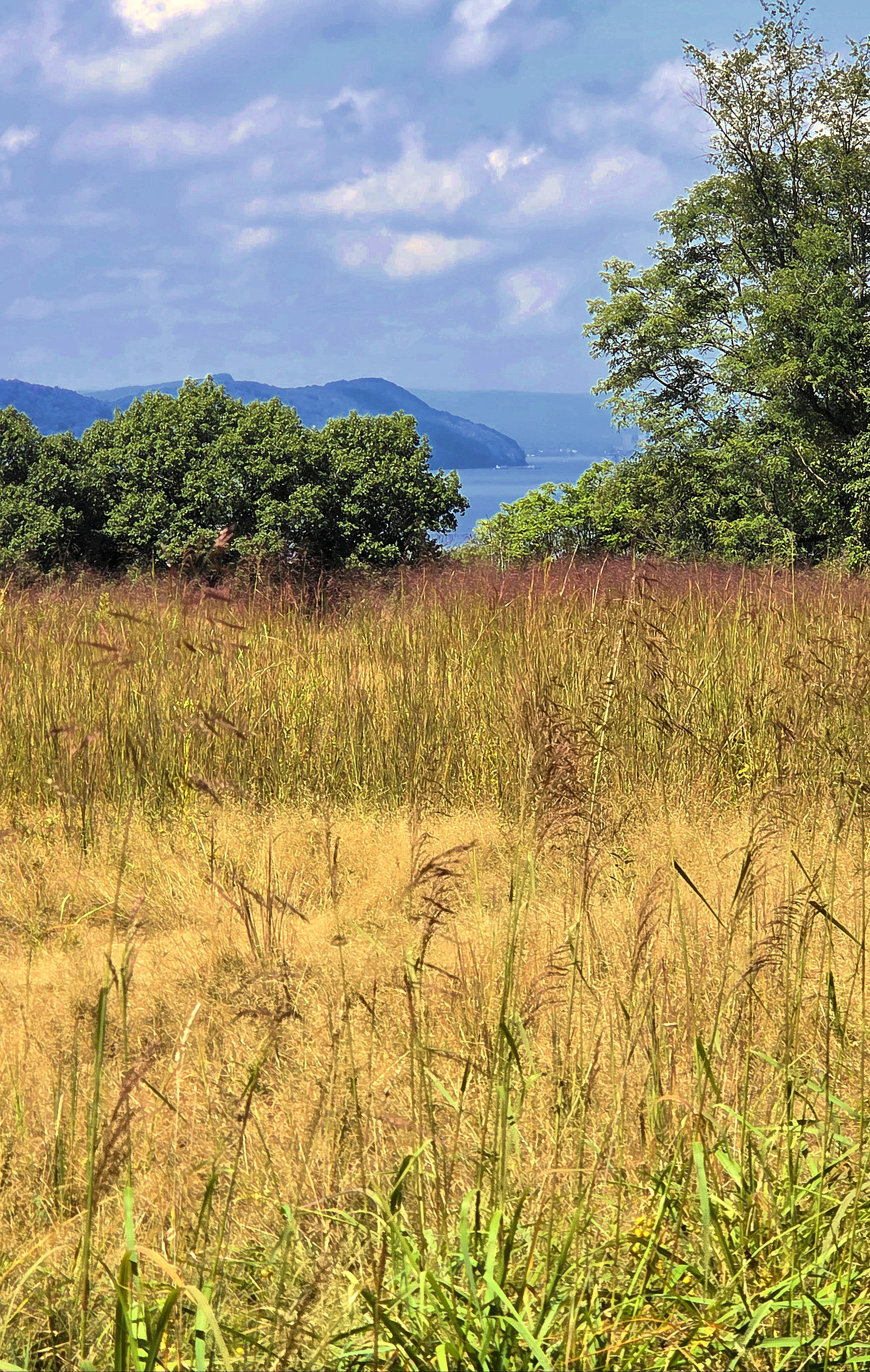
Grass field at Rockwood Hall

Frederick Law Olmsted designed the landscaped property for William Rockefeller, consisting of hills, dales, woodlands, and meadows. Olmsted had young trees planted and old trees transplanted. He planted rare trees including Golden Oak, Weeping Beech, Purple Beech, Cutleaf Beech, English Beech, American Beech, Ginkgo, Weeping Willow, White, Red and Scarlet Oak, Norway Spruce, Colorado Blue Spruce, Pink Horsechestnut, White and Pink Dogwood, and Dwarf Japanese Maple. These groves blocked view of Rockwood Hall from Route 9. A formal garden, 150 by 60 feet (46 m × 18 m), lay in front of the house, along with a 2-acre (0.81 ha) flower garden, a 3.25 acres (1.32 ha) vegetable garden, 17 greenhouses, and a gardener's cottage. Two streams and several artificial ponds existed on the property, which had swans and ducks in the summertime.

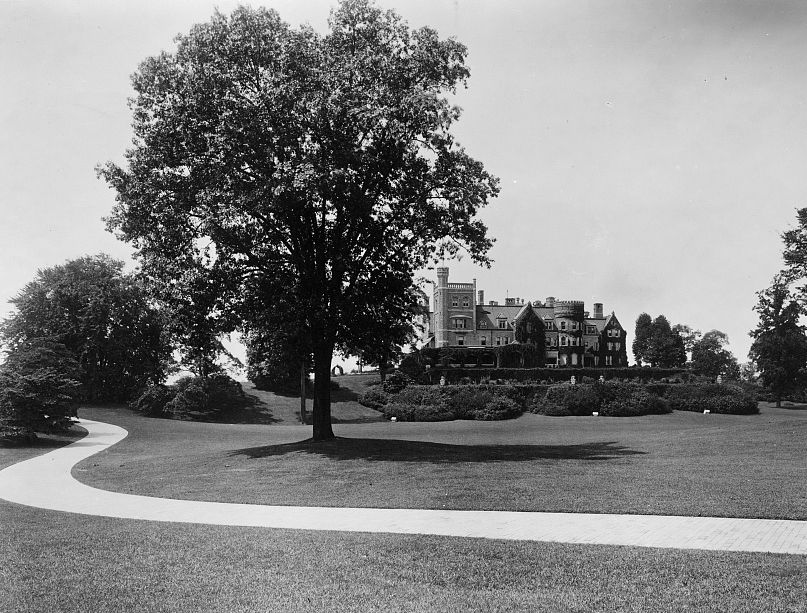
Rockwood Hall and surrounds, 1916

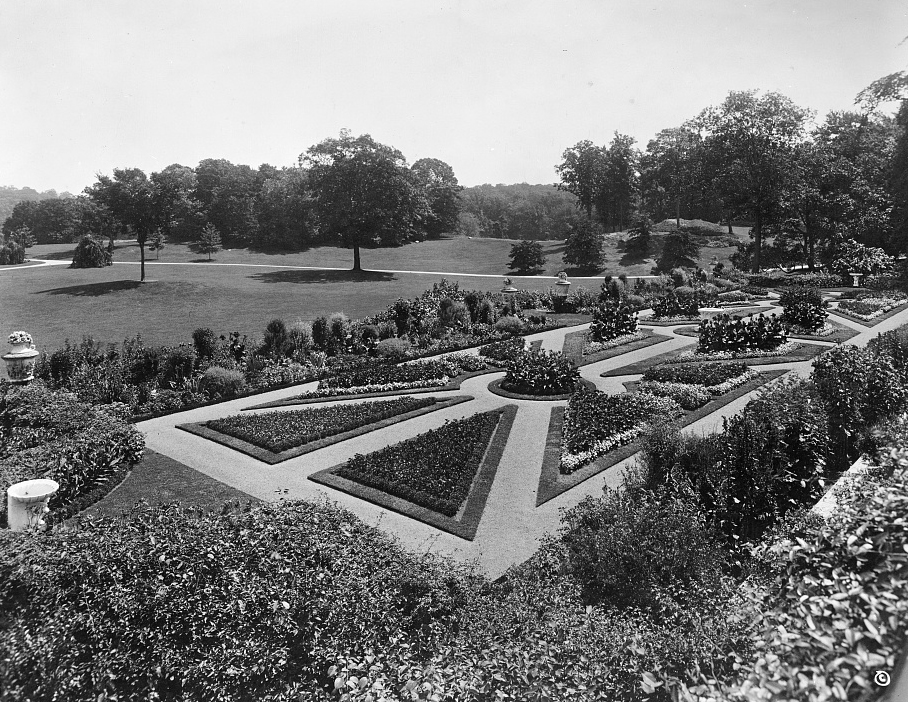
Rockwood Hall's gardens, 1916

The landscape included a network of winding carriage roads through the woods. The roads were 16 feet (4.9 m) wide with an 8-inch crown in the middle; a large drainage system was built in to control flooding. Two miles of the roads used Hastings block, a paving stone constructed in nearby Hastings-on-Hudson; the remaining roads were made of compacted crushed stone.

Outbuildings included a three-story stable, a carpenter's shop, paint shop, stone ice house, farm barn, hennery, 17 greenhouses, and a 4-acre (1.6 ha) outdoor nursery for 1,000 rare trees and shrubs. Also on the property was a boathouse, dock, a spring, and an electric lighting plant. Rockefeller also built a shed for his private train car, built next to and parallel to the New York Central tracks by his property. The stone ice house on the property used rock salt to preserve meats and vegetables. The main granite stable had 40 stalls, an indoor riding court, and a gallery. The coach house had housing on its second floor for the families of the stable employees. The stone boathouse had numerous boats and a steam-based launch. The farm barn had 32 stalls for cows and stables for farm horses and sheep. Rockefeller kept Jersey cattle and Southdown sheep (used to trim the lawns). The poultry plant was used to house chickens, ducks, pheasants, and pigeons. The boathouse was reached by a 150-foot steel bridge over the railroad tracks. It was built around 1913 and had six dressing rooms, a bathroom, and a sitting room with a fireplace, along with yachts, rowboats, and canoes. 50 feet (15 m) north of the boathouse was the 135 by 35 feet (41 m × 11 m) dock. Pipes for oil and water were laid between the power house and dock, for fueling boats and launching them.

About 600 yards (550 m) to 700 yards (640 m) from the house were the two stable buildings, mostly hidden from view by dense shrubbery. The buildings were built using granite taken from the mansion during Rockefeller's renovations. Together the stables contained housing for the estate superintendent, about 50 stalls for horses, space for carriages, a gallery, riding court, and a large court with a wood floor for indoor sports.

The farmland on the property was primarily used to grow hay and potatoes. The grounds also had two small brooks running through them which carried trout.

During Rockwood Hall's inhabitance, the property had three entrances. Two had stone gatehouses on one side of the entrance, while the third, the center gate, only had oak trees around the road, and led to the principle driveway to the stables and mansion. The main entrance gate has an old milestone within the wall, reading "Thirty miles from City Hall, New York City".

One entrance had a swinging metal gate on two granite posts, next to a relatively undecorated gatehouse. The drive from the gate to the house took a visitor along a slightly ascending and winding road, through a grove of elms, to the east of Rockwood Hall.

== Legacy ==
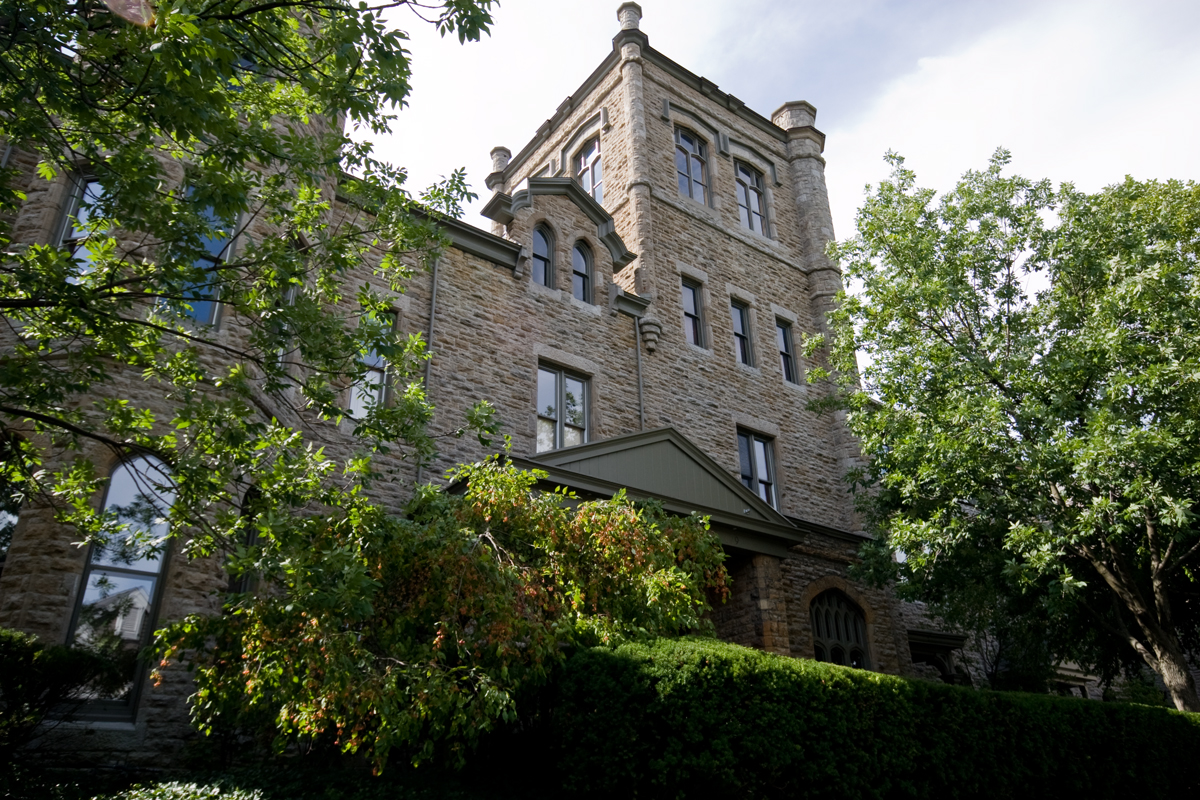
Sacred Heart Academy in Cincinnati, Ohio

The house's architecture inspired the design of the Sacred Heart Academy in Cincinnati, Ohio, which was built from 1864 to 1867 by Thomas Sargent as a private home for William C. Neff. The Cincinnati building is described as a "copy reversed left-to-right" of Rockwood Hall. The likely intermediate sources for Sargent were images published in Villas on the Hudson, by A. A. Turner.

=== Present-day park ===
The former location of Rockwood Hall, and the surrounding estate, are now part of the Rockefeller State Park Preserve.

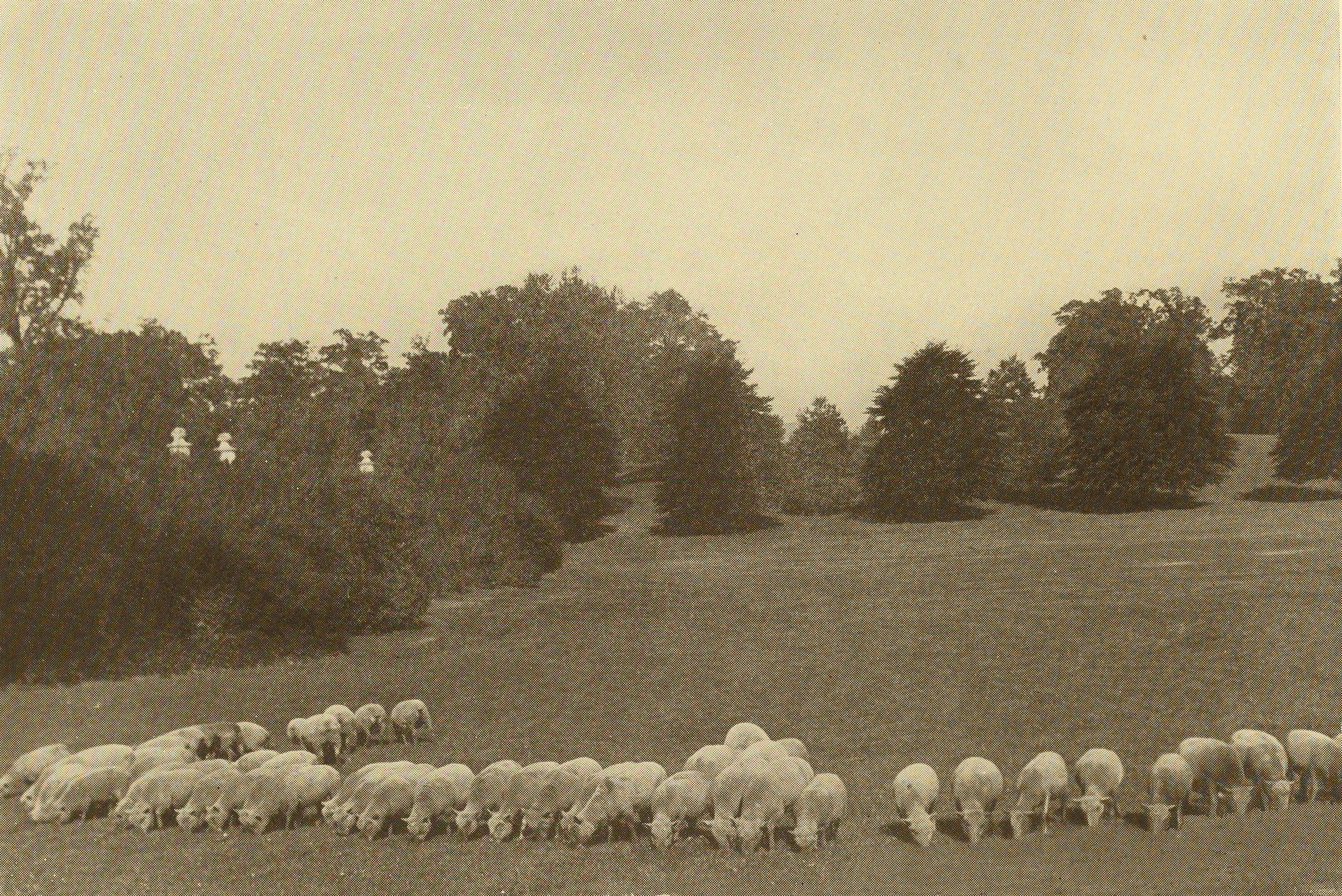
Southdown sheep at Rockwood, c. 1923

In 2014 and 2015, the Stone Barns Center for Food and Agriculture, a nearby non-profit farm, tended sheep and goats in this park. The effort was described as an experiment in land management to improve landscape health and ecosystem function, as well as possibly to increase access to land for beginning farmers by allowing them access to parks and other public lands.

During the project, a shepherd would rotate the flock every few days through a series of paddocks, coaxing the animals to graze invasive plants like akebia and porcelain berry. The project gave the center additional land and forage for sheep, and helped control invasive plants and improve soil health. Local supporters of the project included New York Life, which supplied water, and the nearby retirement community Kendal on Hudson. From July to November 2014, the farm tended 50 sheep and 7 goats in the pastures of Rockwood Hall. In 2015, 10 Boer goats, 30 Tunis sheep, and 50 Finn Dorset sheep were moved to Rockwood Hall to graze.

During Rockefeller's ownership, about 100 Southdown sheep would roam the grounds.

== Gallery ==
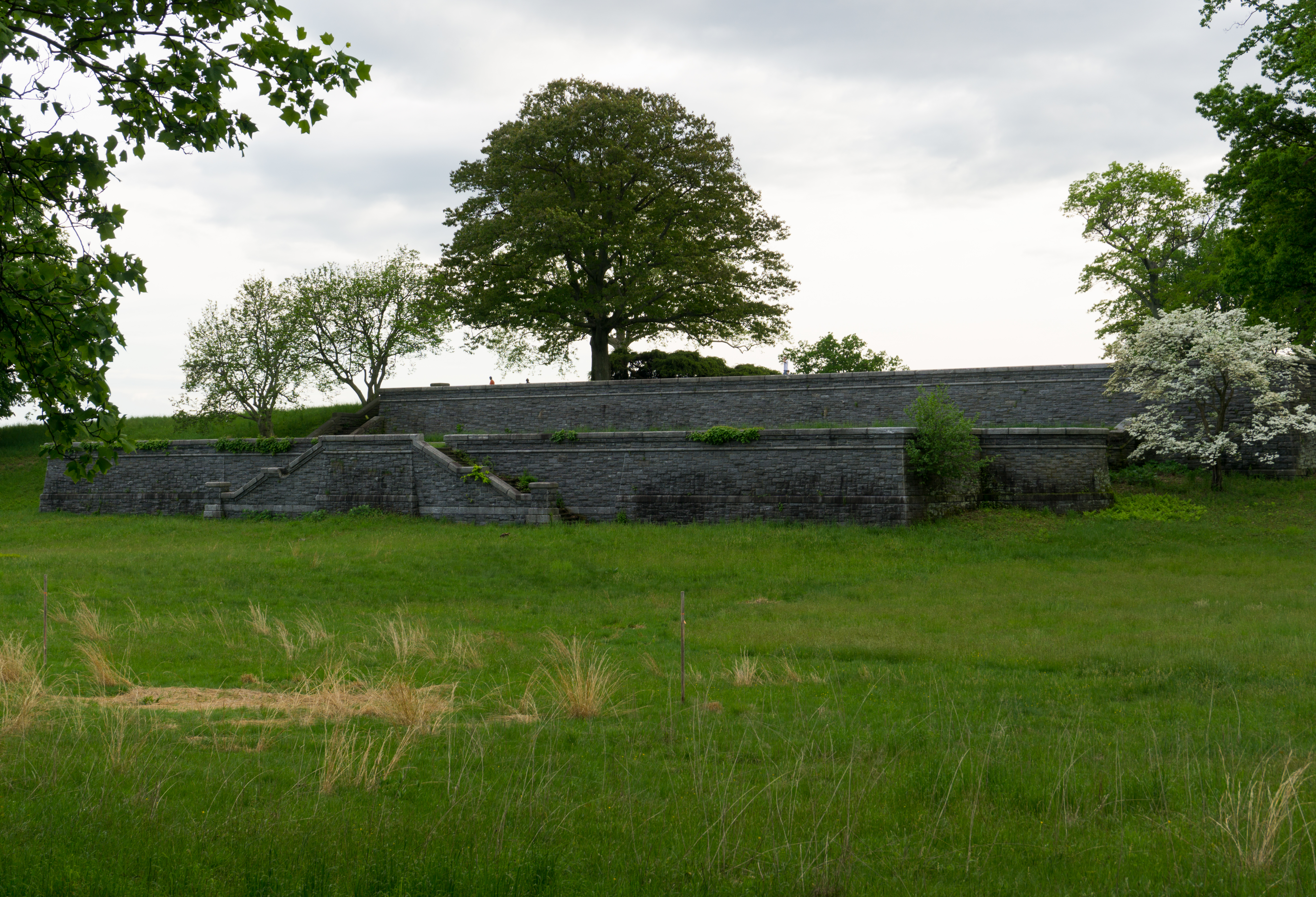
Rockwood Hall mansion's foundation

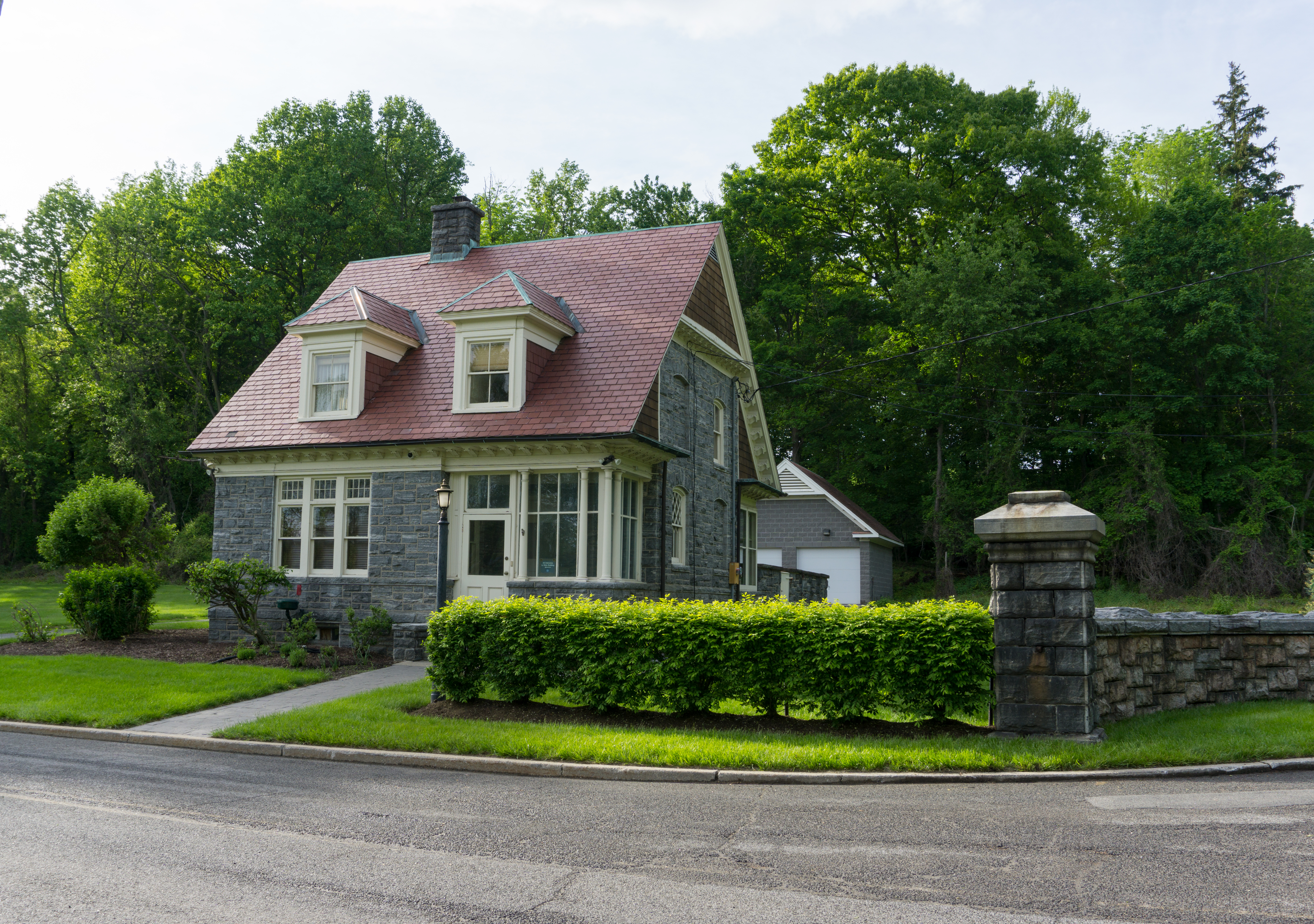
The estate's north gatehouse

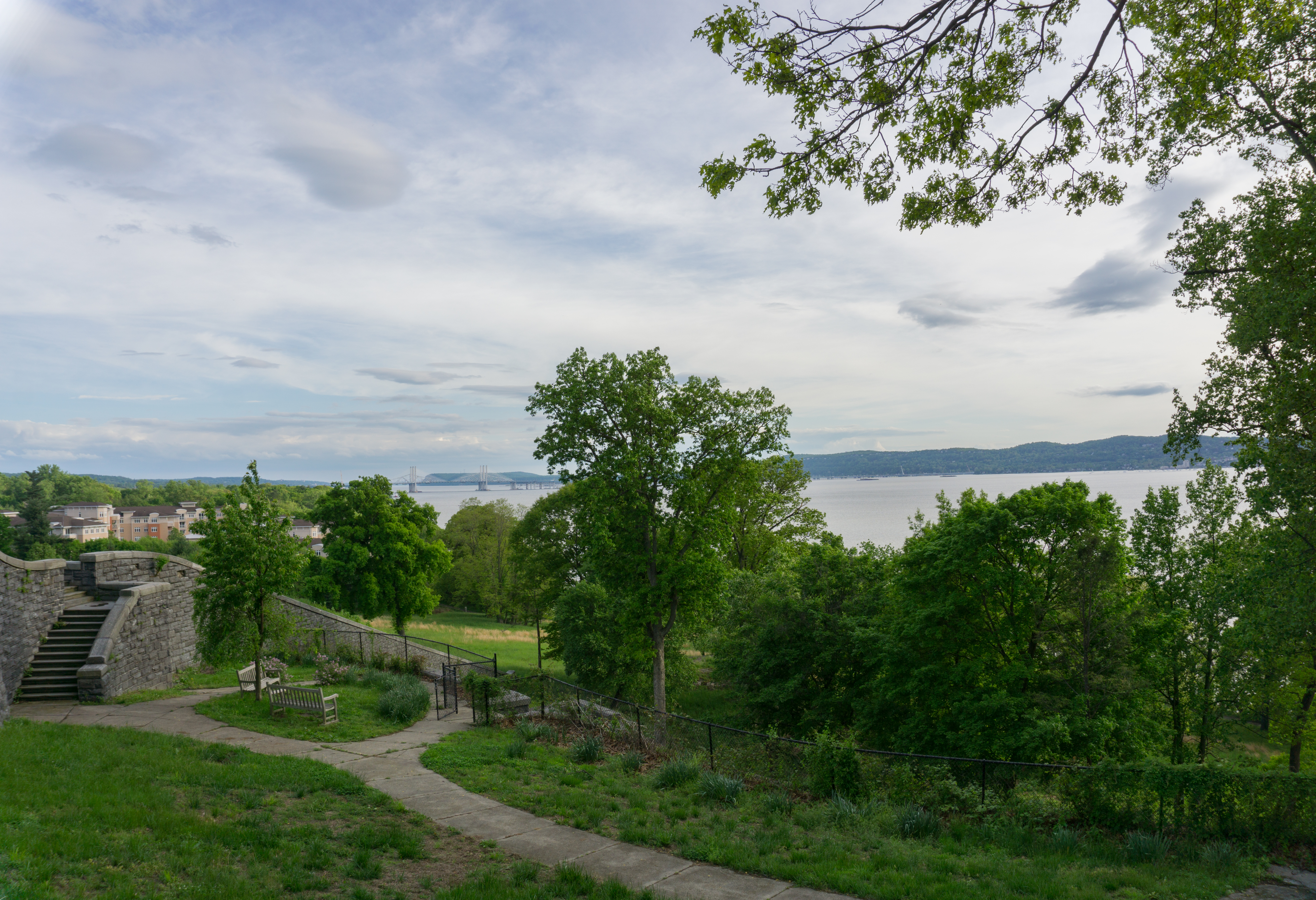
View of the Tappan Zee Bridge and Hudson River

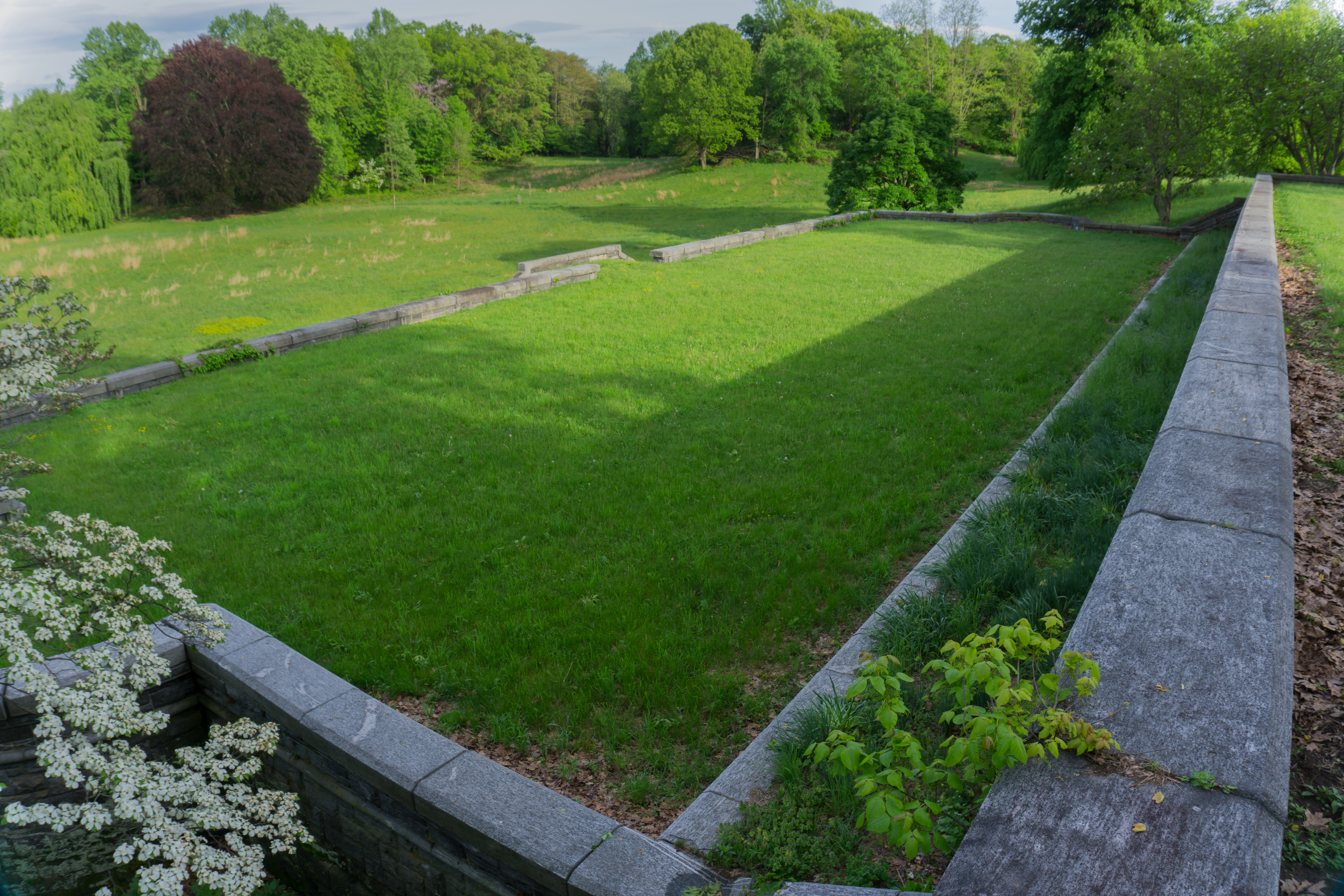
Former tennis court

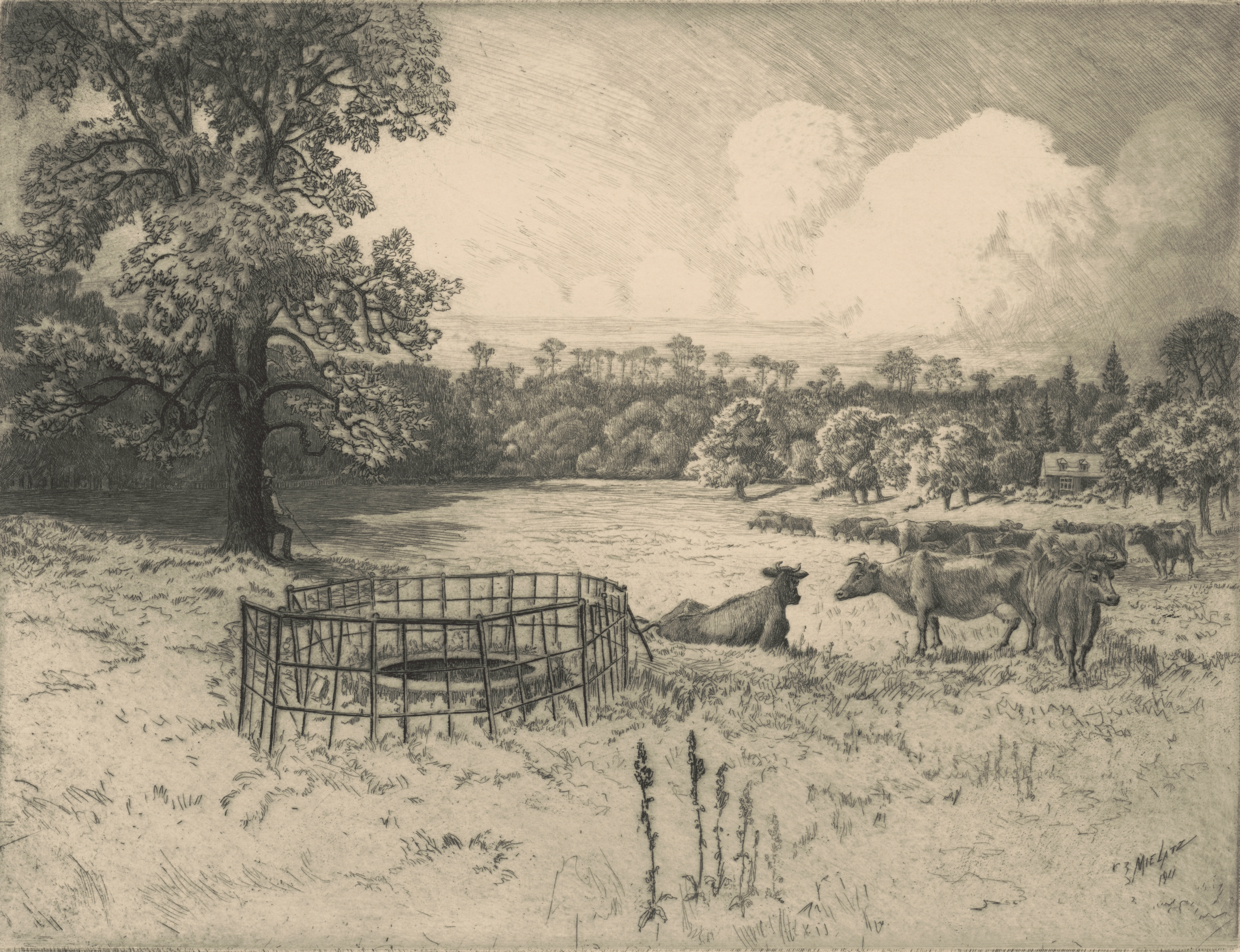
Rockwood Hall illustration by Charles Frederick William Mielatz, 1911

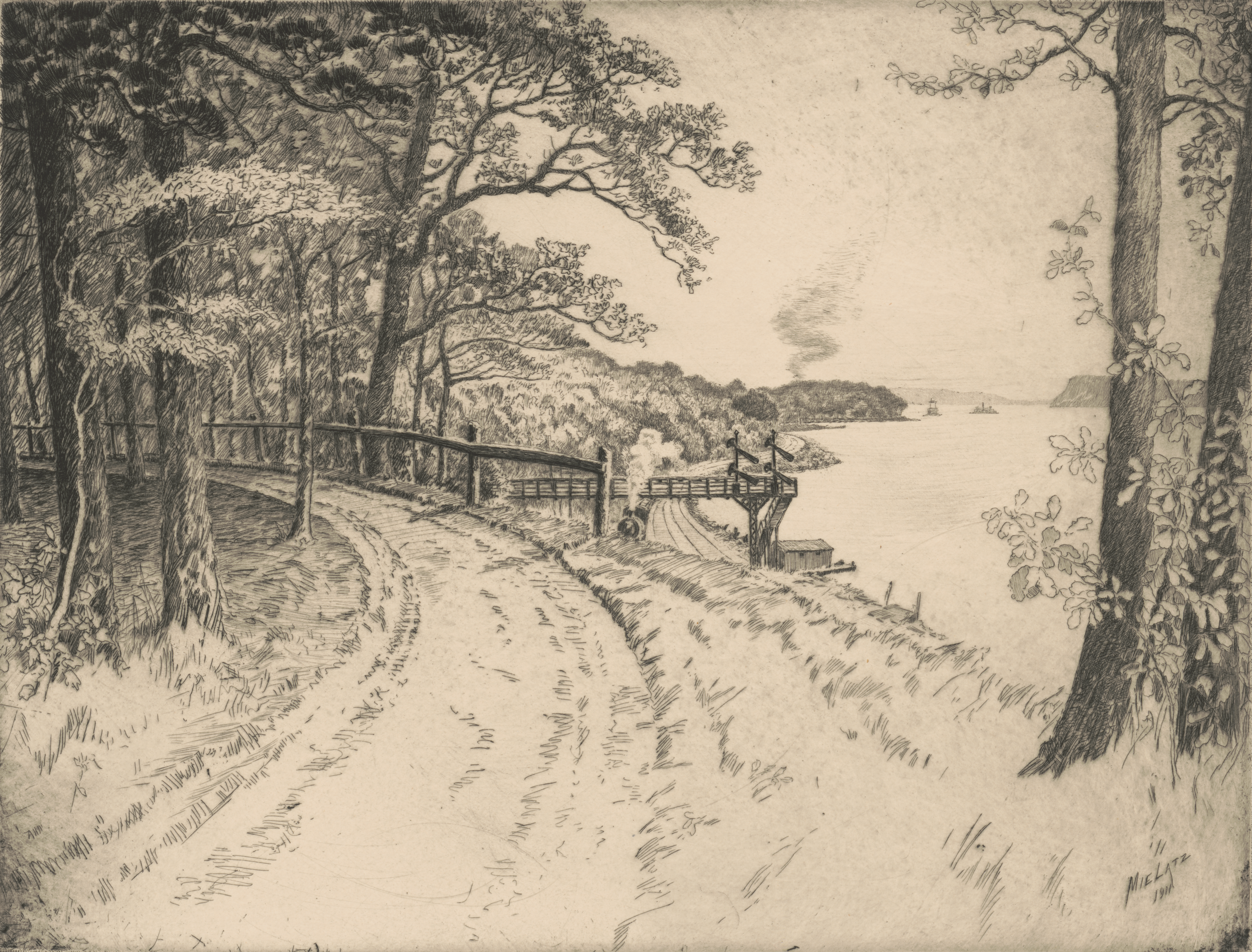
Mielatz, 1911

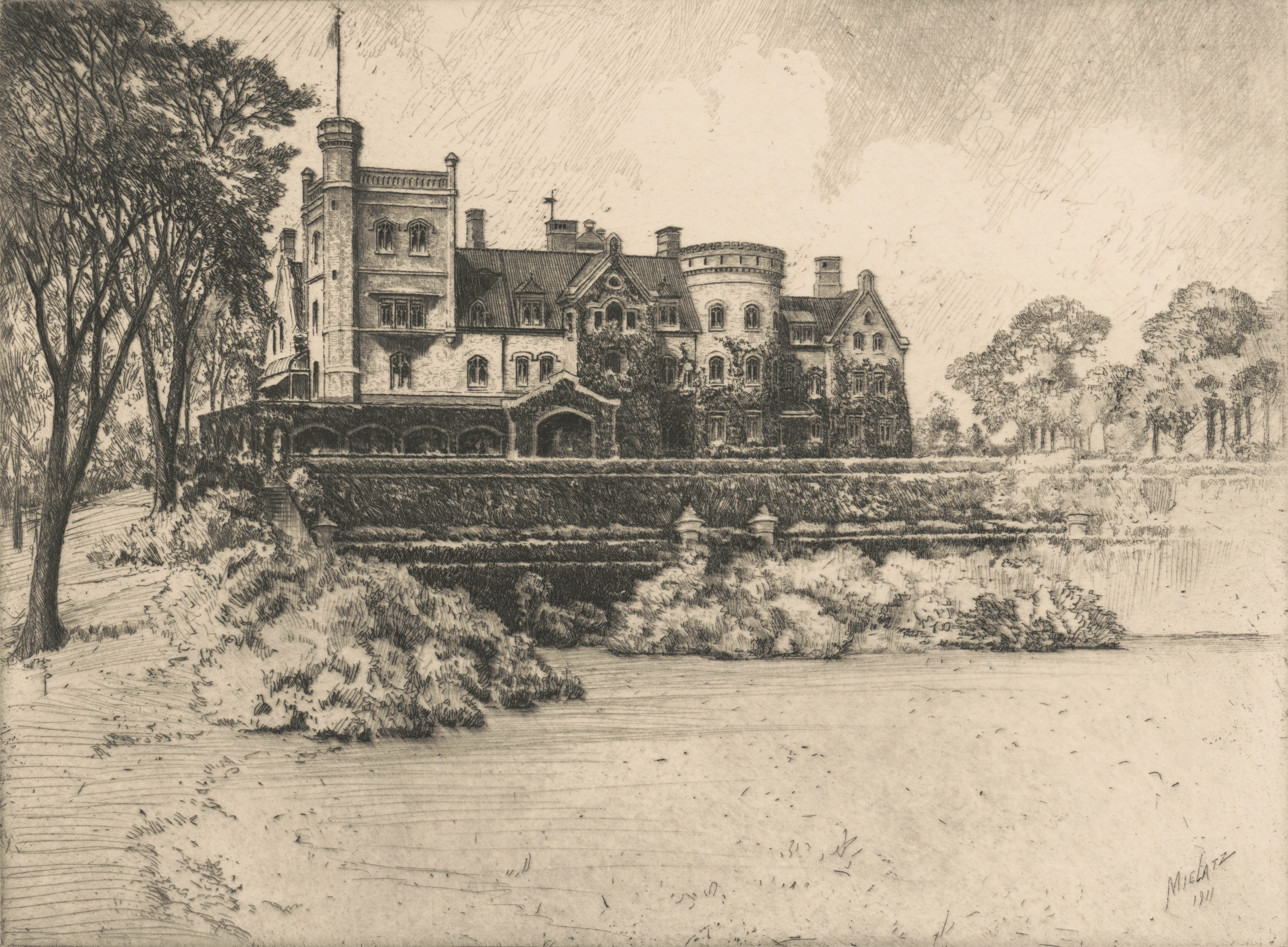
Mielatz, 1911

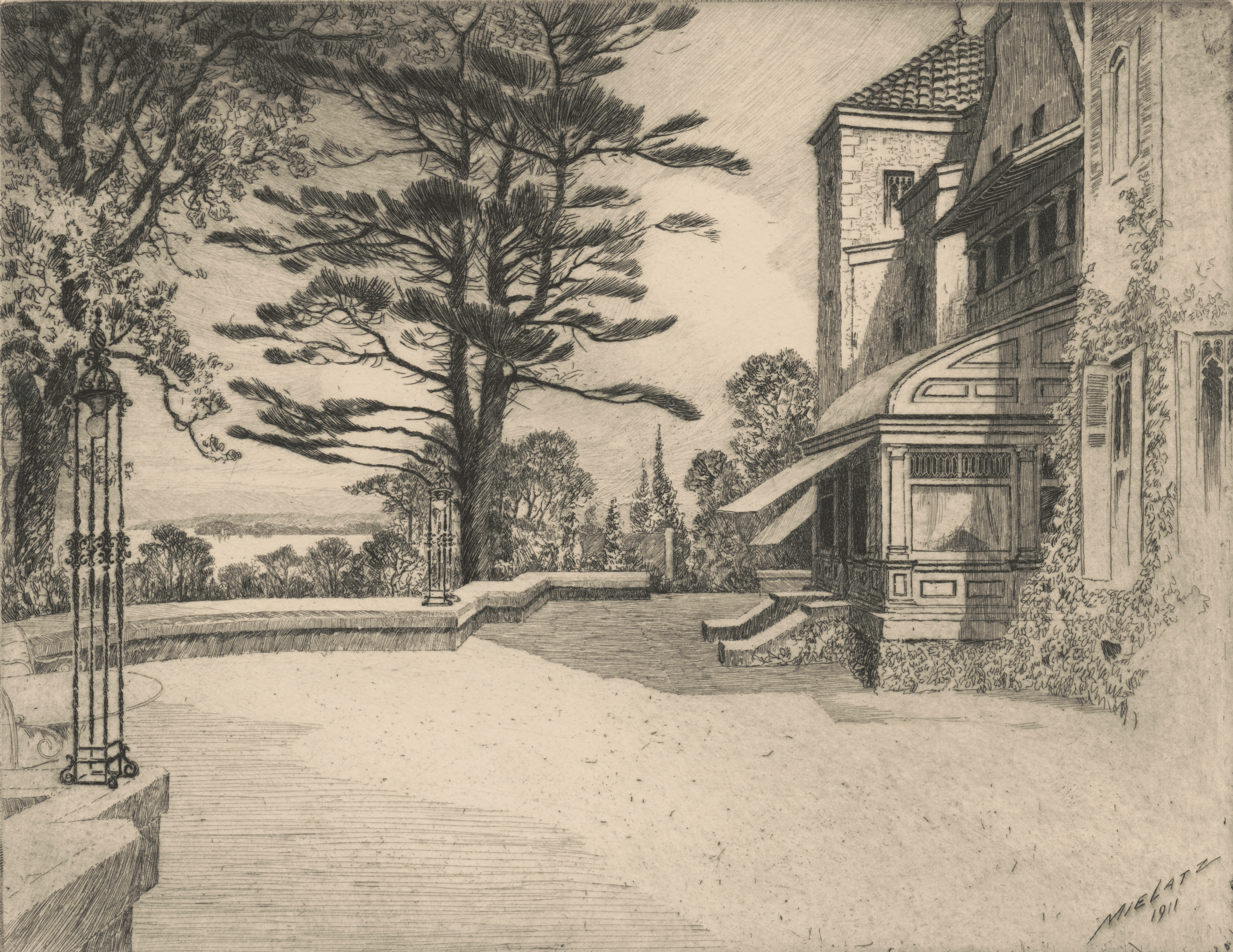
Mielatz, 1911

== See also ==
- List of Gilded Age mansions
- Archville, New York
- Old Croton Aqueduct
