= Hastings Robinson =

Church of England clergyman (1792–1866)

The Reverend Hastings Robinson FSA
- Rector of Great Warley
- Appointed: 26 October 1827

Personal details
- Born: February 1792 Lichfield, Staffordshire
- Died: 18 May 1866 (aged 74) Great Warley, Essex
- Denomination: Anglican
- Spouse: Margaret Ann Clay (m. 1828)

Hastings Robinson, FSA (1792–1866), was an English Church of England clergyman and Anglican divine. He was a graduate of Rugby and St. John's College, Cambridge, proceeding M.A. in 1818 and D.D. in 1836, and was a fellow and assistant-tutor at St John's from 1816 to 1827. He held the living of Great Warley from 1827, and was the honorary canon of Rochester from 1862. He was elected F.S.A. in 1824, and edited classical and other works.

== Life ==
Hastings Robinson, eldest son of the Rev. Richard George Robinson, vicar of Harborne, by his wife Mary, daughter of Robert Thorp of Buxton, Derbyshire, was born at Lichfield in February 1792. He went to Rugby in 1806, and proceeded to St. John's College, Cambridge, where he graduated B.A. in 1815, M.A. in 1818, and D.D. in 1836. He was a fellow and assistant-tutor from 1816 to 1827, when he was appointed curate to Charles Simeon. He stood unsuccessfully for the regius professorship of Greek at Cambridge, and was Cambridge examiner at Rugby, where he founded a theological prize.

On 26 October 1827 he was appointed by his college to the living of Great Warley, near Brentwood, Essex. He was collated to an honorary canonry in Rochester Cathedral on 11 March 1862.

Robinson was an earnest evangelical churchman (cf. his Church Reform on Christian Principles, London, 1833). In 1837 he drew up and presented two memorials to the Society for Promoting Christian Knowledge (London, 1837, 8vo), protesting against certain publications as contrary to the work of the Reformation. He died at Great Warley on 18 May 1866, and was buried there. He married, in 1828, Margaret Ann, daughter of Joseph Clay of Burton-on-Trent, who predeceased him.

== Works ==
Robinson, who was elected F.S.A. on 20 May 1824, published literary works:

- The Electra of Euripides, Cambridge, 1822, editor with notes
- Acta Apostolorum variorum notis tum dictionem tum materiam illustrantibus, Cambridge, 1824 (2nd edit. 1839)
- James Ussher's Body of Divinity, London, 1841, editor.

For the Parker Society he prepared The Zurich Letters, being the Correspondence of English Bishops and others with the Swiss Reformers during the Reign of Elizabeth, translated and edited, 2 vols., Cambridge, 1842 and 1845, and Original Letters relative to the English Reformation, also from the Archives of Zurich, 2 vols., Cambridge, 1846 and 1847.

With the Rev. Thomas Harding (1805–1874) of Bexley, Robinson edited anonymously a Memoir (1855) of the Rev. Henry Budd after his death in 1853.

== Sources ==
- Fell-Smith, Charlotte; Kuykendall, Ronald Dent (2004). "Robinson, Hastings (1792–1866), Church of England clergyman". Oxford Dictionary of National Biography (online ed.). Oxford University Press. doi:10.1093/ref:odnb/23839. (Subscription, Wikipedia Library access or UK public library membership required.)

Attribution:

- This article incorporates text from a publication now in the public domain: Smith, Charlotte Fell (1897). "Robinson, Hastings". In Lee, Sidney (ed.). Dictionary of National Biography. Vol. 49. London: Smith, Elder & Co. p. 13.
