= Parker Society =

The Parker Society was a text publication society set up in 1841 to produce editions of the works of the early Protestant writers of the English Reformation. It was supported by both the High Church and evangelical wings of the Church of England, and was established in reaction against the Tractarian movement of the 1830s. Its council was dominated by evangelicals, but not to the exclusion of other views.

In response, a group of Tractarians founded the Library of Anglo-Catholic Theology.

The Society took its name from Matthew Parker (1504–1575), Archbishop of Canterbury from 1559 to 1575, and a prominent collector of manuscripts. It published four or five volumes a year, to 1853.

== Publications ==
A General Index to the Publications of the Parker Society was published in 1855 by Henry Gough; the publications are listed on pp. vii–viii.

=== Single authors ===
Author	Title	Date of edition	Editor
John Bale	Select Works	1849	Henry Christmas
Thomas Becon	Early Works	1843	John Ayre
	The Catechism	1844	John Ayre
	Prayers and other pieces	1844	John Ayre
John Bradford	Writings (two vols.)	1848, 1853	Aubrey Townshend
Henry Bullinger	Decades (four vols.)	1849–51	Thomas Harding
James Calfhill	An Answer to John Martiall's Treatise of the Cross	1846	Richard Gibbings
Thomas Cooper	An Answer in Defence of the Truth	1850	William Goode
Myles Coverdale	Writings and Translations	1844	George Pearson
	Remains	1846	George Pearson
Thomas Cranmer	Works (two vols.)	1844, 1846	John Edmund Cox
William Fulke	A defence of the sincere and true translations of the Holy Scriptures into the English tongue, against the cavils of Gregory Martin	1843	Charles Henry Hartshorne
	Stapleton's Fortress overthrown. A rejoinder to Martiall's Reply. A discovery of the dangerous rock of the popish church commended by Sanders.	1848	Richard Gibbings
Edmund Grindal	Remains	1843	William Nicholson
John Hooper	Early Writings	1843	Samuel Carr
	Later Writings	1852	Charles Nevinson
Roger Hutchinson	Works	1842	John Bruce
John Jewel	Works (four vols.)	1845, 1847, 1848, 1850	John Ayre
Hugh Latimer	Works (two vols.)	1844-5	George Elwes Corrie
John Norden	A Progress of Piety	1847
Alexander Nowell	Catechism	1853	George Elwes Corrie
Matthew Parker	Correspondence	1853	John Bruce and Thomas Thomason Perowne
John Philpot	Examinations and Writings	1842	Robert Eden
James Pilkington	Works	1842	James Scholefield
Nicholas Ridley	Works	1841	Henry Christmas
Thomas Rogers	The Catholic Doctrine of the Church of England: An exposition of the Thirty-nine articles	1854	John James Stewart Perowne
Edwin Sandys	Sermons	1841	John Ayre
William Tyndale	Doctrinal Treatises, and Introductions to different portions of the Holy Scriptures	1848	Henry Walter
	Expositions and Notes on sundry portions of the Holy Scriptures	1849	Henry Walter
	An Answer to Sir Thomas More's Dialogue	1850	Henry Walter
William Whitaker	A Disputation on Holy Scripture against the Papists	1849	William Fitzgerald
John Whitgift	Works (three vols.)	1851–3	John Ayre
John Woolton	The Christian Manual	1851

=== Collections ===
Title	Date of edition	Editor
The Two Liturgies, A.D. 1549, and A.D. 1552	1844	Joseph Ketley
Liturgies and Occasional Forms of Prayer set forth in the Reign of Queen Elizabeth	1847	William Keatinge Clay
Select Poetry, Chiefly Devotional, of the Reign of Queen Elizabeth (two vols.)	1845	Edward Farr
Private Prayers, put forth by authority during the Reign of Queen Elizabeth	1851	William Keatinge Clay
Christian Prayers and Holy Meditations, as well for private as public exercise	1842	Reprint from Henry Bull (1566)
The Zurich Letters: comprising the correspondence of several English bishops and others, with some of the Helvetian reformers, during the early part of the reign of Queen Elizabeth (two vols.)	1842	Hastings Robinson
Original Letters relative to the English Reformation: written during the reigns of King Henry VIII, King Edward VI, and Queen Mary: chiefly from the archives of Zurich (two vols.)	1847	Hastings Robinson

== See also ==
- Library of Anglo-Catholic Theology
- Library of the Fathers
