= Bartlett's Buildings =

Former street in the City of London

Coordinates: 51°31′2.32″N 0°6′28.57″W

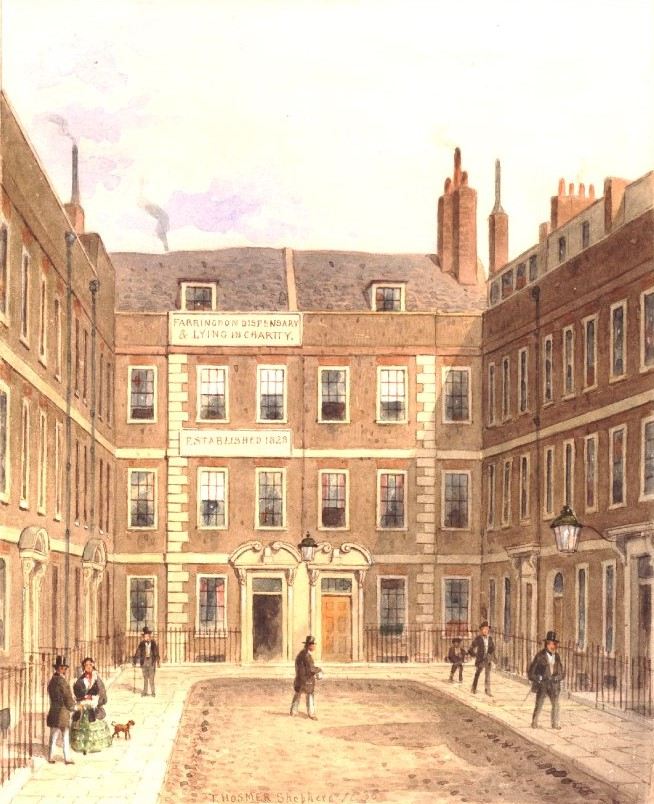
Bartlett's Buildings by Thomas Hosmer Shepherd, 1858.

Bartlett's Buildings, once known as Bartlett's Court, was the name of a street, off Holborn Circus in the City of London, known for the number of lawyers who had offices there. It was a cul-de-sac but an alley ran from the west side to Fetter Lane that was known as Bartlett's Passage. It was destroyed in 1941 during a Second World War air raid.

== History ==
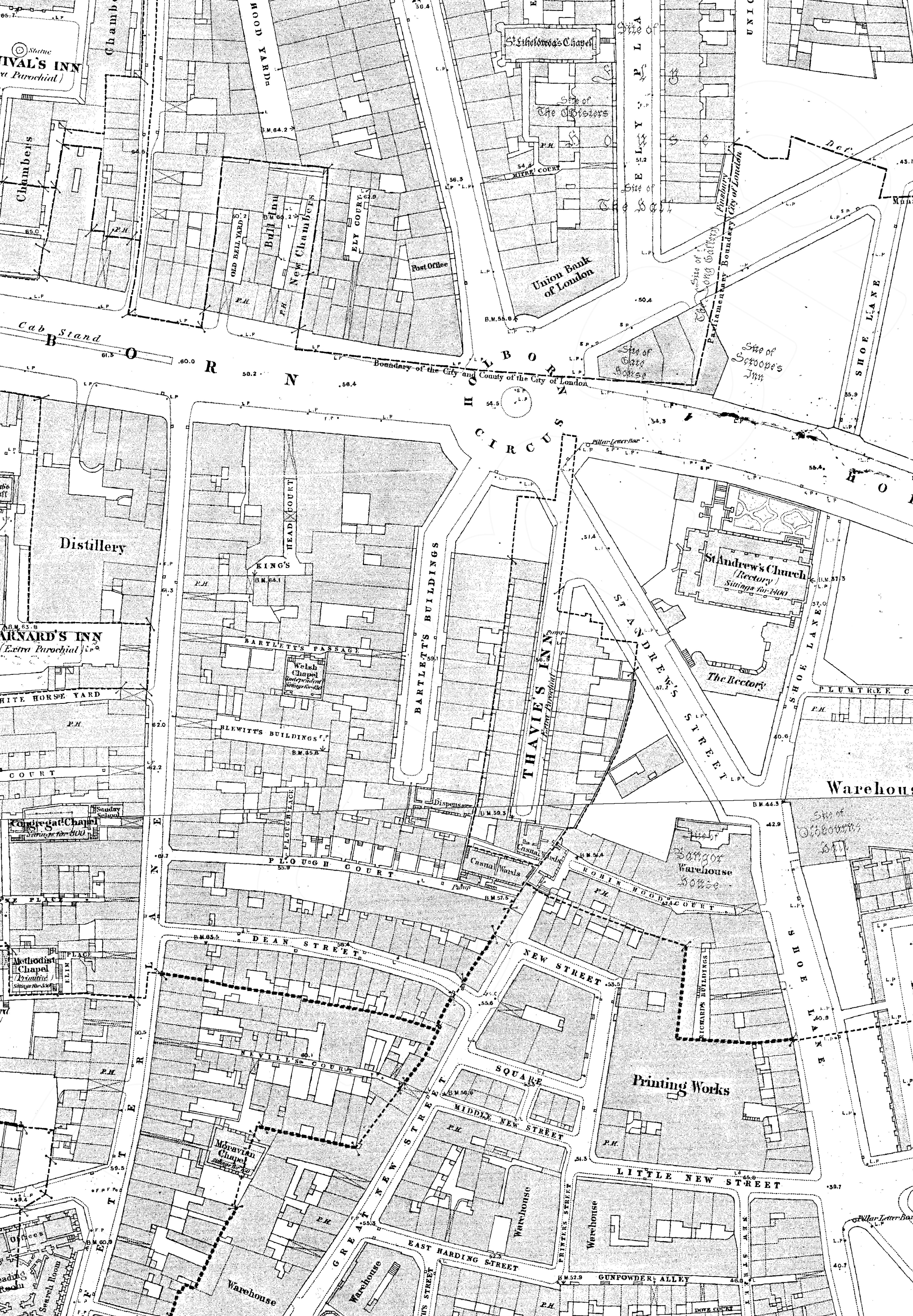
Holborn Circus on an 1870s Ordnance Survey map, Bartlett's Buildings centre.

George Thornbury noted in 1878 that it was mentioned in the burial register of St. Andrew's, the parish of which it was a part, as early as November 1615, when it was called Bartlett's Court.

John Strype's A survey of the Cities of London and Westminster (1720) calls it "a very handsome spacious Place, graced with good Buildings of Brick, with Gardens behind the Houses; and is a Place very well inhabited by Gentry, and Persons of good Repute."

Henry Chamberlain's 1770 survey said: "Bartlet's-buildings is a very handsome spacious place, graced with good houses of brick, with gardens behind them, and is principally inhabited by gentlemen".

Bartlett's Buildings is mentioned in Jane Austen's novel Sense and Sensibility (1811) as the place where the two Miss Steeles lodge when visiting their cousin.

The street was once home to the Farringdon Dispensary and Lying in Charity, shown in a watercolour drawing by Thomas Hosmer Shepherd of 1858.

The street was totally destroyed during a Second World War air raid in 1941 and subsequently replaced by New Fetter Lane.
