= Pocantico =

Pocantico may refer to:

- Pocantico Hills, New York
- Pocantico River
- Pocantico (estate)
