= Pocantico River =

River in the United States of America

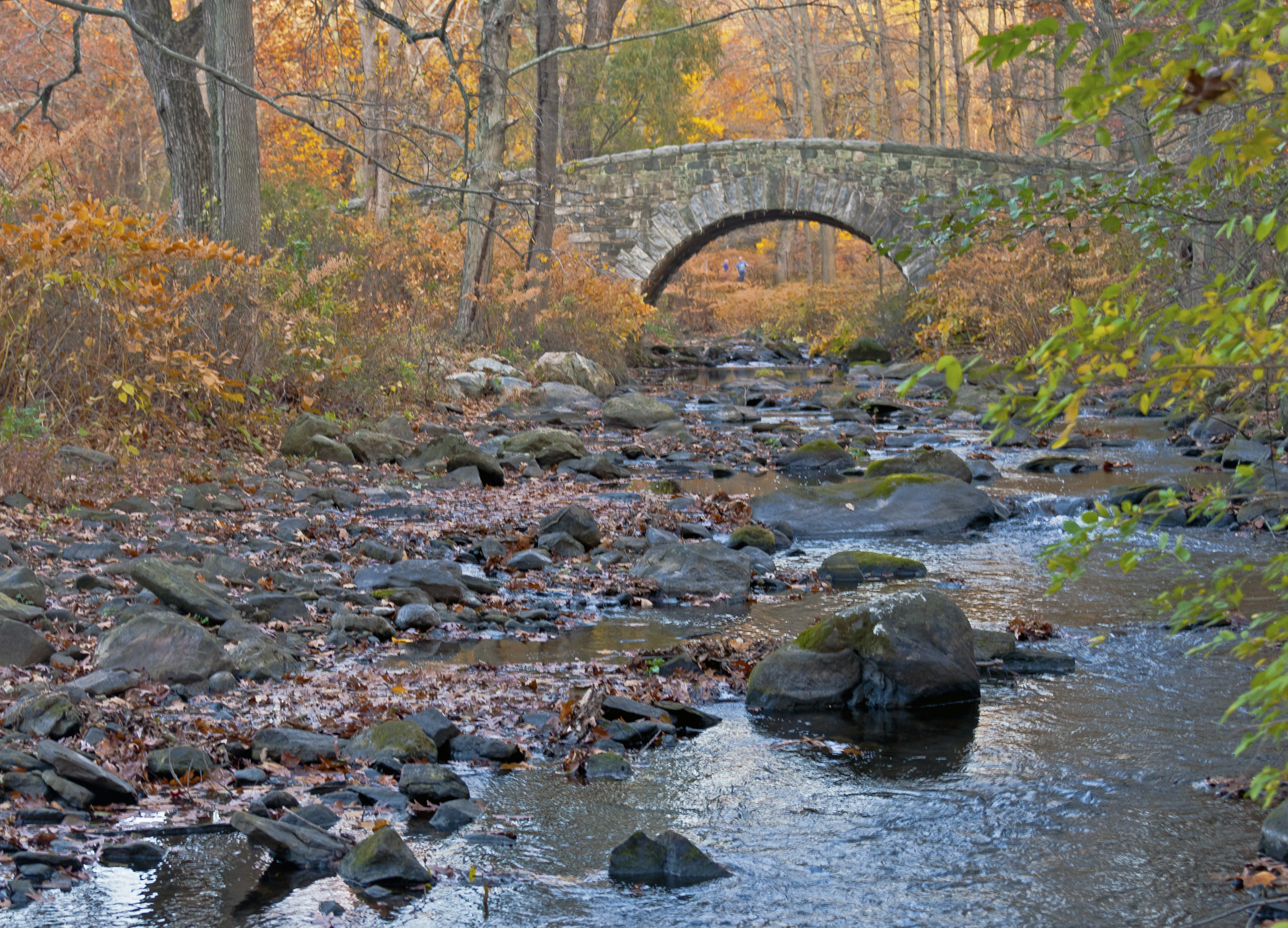
- The Pocantico as it flows through Rockefeller State Park

Location
- Country: United States
- State: New York
- Region: Hudson Valley
- County: Westchester
- City: New Castle, Briarcliff Manor, Mount Pleasant, Sleepy Hollow,

Physical characteristics
- Source: Echo Lake
  - location: New Castle
  - coordinates: 41°10′48.2″N 73°48′36.2″W
  - elevation: 325 ft (99 m)
- Mouth: Hudson River
  - location: Sleepy Hollow
  - coordinates: 41°5′29.5″N 73°52′12.9″W
- Length: 9 mi (14 km)
- Discharge
  - location: Rockefeller State Park
  - average: 37.19 cu ft/s (1.053 m^{3}/s)
  - minimum: 15 cu ft/s (0.42 m^{3}/s)
  - maximum: 77.3 cu ft/s (2.19 m^{3}/s)

Basin features
- Tributaries
  - left: Rockefeller Brook
  - right: Caney Brook, Gory Brook

The Pocantico River is a nine-mile-long (14 km) tributary of the Hudson River in western central Westchester County, New York, United States. It rises from Echo Lake in the town of New Castle south of the hamlet of Millwood, and flows generally southwest past Briarcliff Manor to its outlet at Sleepy Hollow. Portions of the towns of Mount Pleasant and Ossining are within its 16-square-mile (41 km^{2}) watershed.

Writer Washington Irving, who lived in the area for most of his life, was inspired by the undeveloped area above the river's mouth to write his classic "The Legend of Sleepy Hollow". Later in the 19th century much of the land was purchased by the Rockefeller family as part of their Kykuit estate; today much of that land has become Rockefeller State Park Preserve. A former reservoir used by the city of New Rochelle has likewise been converted into county-run Pocantico Lake Park. While the river runs predominantly through those parks and suburban land, it is still one of the most polluted tributaries of the Hudson.

== Course ==
In the past the Pocantico was considered to have two different sources, but today it is acknowledged that it rises from Echo Lake in the town of New Castle between Saw Mill River Road (New York State Route 100) and the Taconic State Parkway, just southwest of the unincorporated hamlet of Millwood. The lake is 325 feet (99 m) above sea level, in a narrow valley between Cabin Ridge to the east and a similarly steep ridge on the west. Its surrounding terrain is primarily wooded and lightly developed outside of the two roads. The river begins at a dam on the lake's south end.

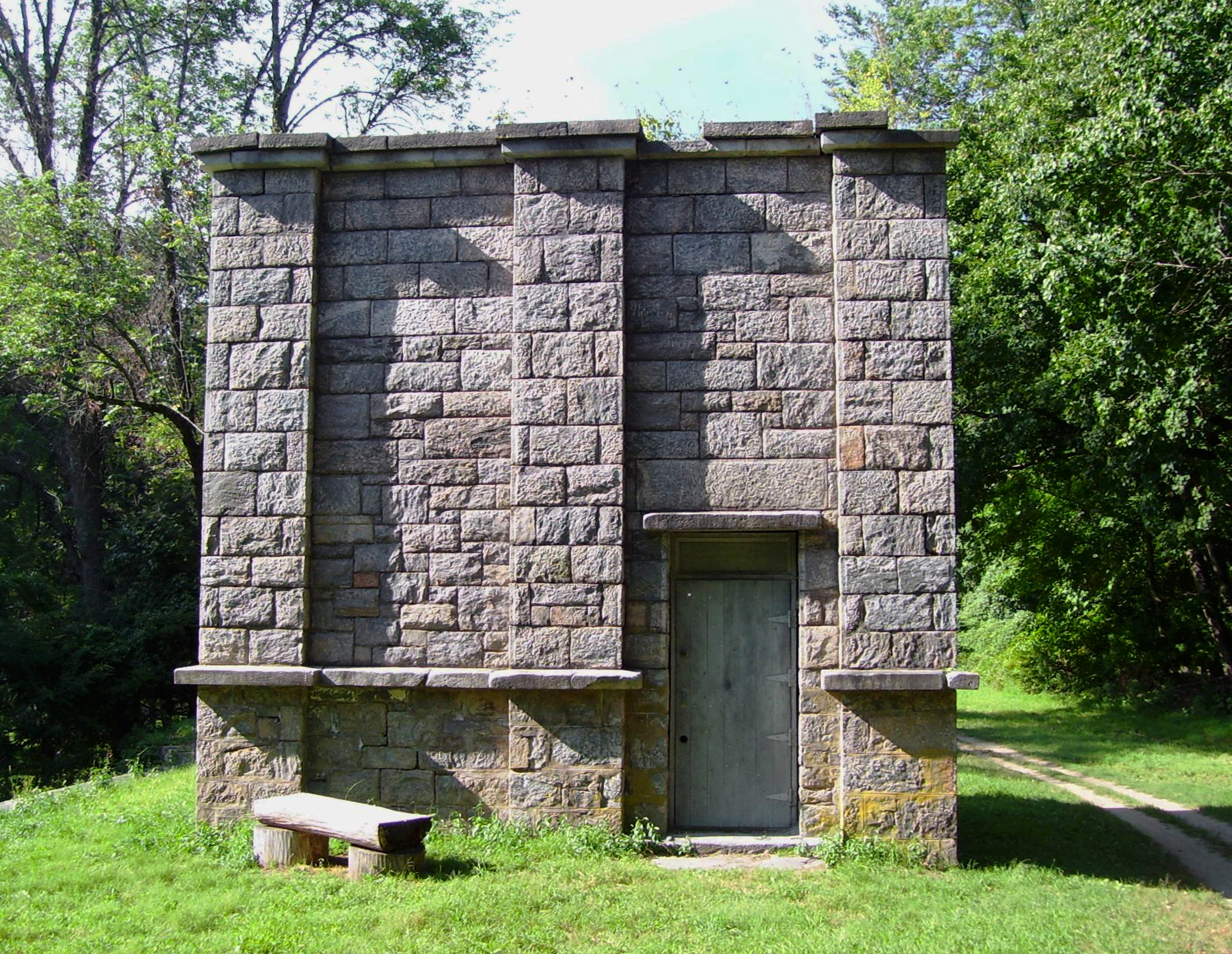
A weir of the Old Croton Aqueduct in Sleepy Hollow; this weir functioned to divert water to the Pocantico River for aqueduct maintenance

Shortly after draining the lake, the Pocantico flows under Route 100, which it remains closely parallel to for the next few miles. About 1,200 feet (370 m) from its source, the stream crosses the town line from New Castle into neighboring Ossining, soon forming the boundary between that town and neighboring Mount Pleasant on its west. A short distance to the south, the river crosses back under Saw Mill River Road and receives its first tributary, the unnamed outlet of Campfire Lake to the northeast, as it, Route 100 and the North County Trailway diverge from the Taconic. The river, road and trail continue heading to the southwest as the Pocantico begins to form the Briarcliff Manor village line at the Chappaqua Road crossing.

Another 1,200 feet south of that crossing, it recrosses Saw Mill River Road just north of where it merges with the Briarcliff–Peekskill Parkway (also State Route 9A). After flowing under the parkway, it passes just east of downtown Briarcliff Manor and then crosses Saw Mill River Road and the parkway again, meandering a little further to the east into residential neighborhoods, then turning south through the village's Jackson Road Park. After that it flows due south to the immediate east of the parkway, itself to the immediate east of a steep slope.

After a slight swing east towards the Taconic, the river crosses under the parkway for the last time and continues on a more southwesterly course past 420-foot (130 m) Beech Hill into 164-acre (66 ha) Pocantico Lake Park. It widens amid swampy areas on either side as it receives Caney Brook from the north and then becomes Pocantico Lake. Midway along the lake, the municipal boundary leaves the river, putting it entirely within the town of Mount Pleasant. The dam at the lake's south end is at 219 feet (67 m) above sea level, a loss of 106 feet (32 m) from the Pocantico's source at Echo Lake.

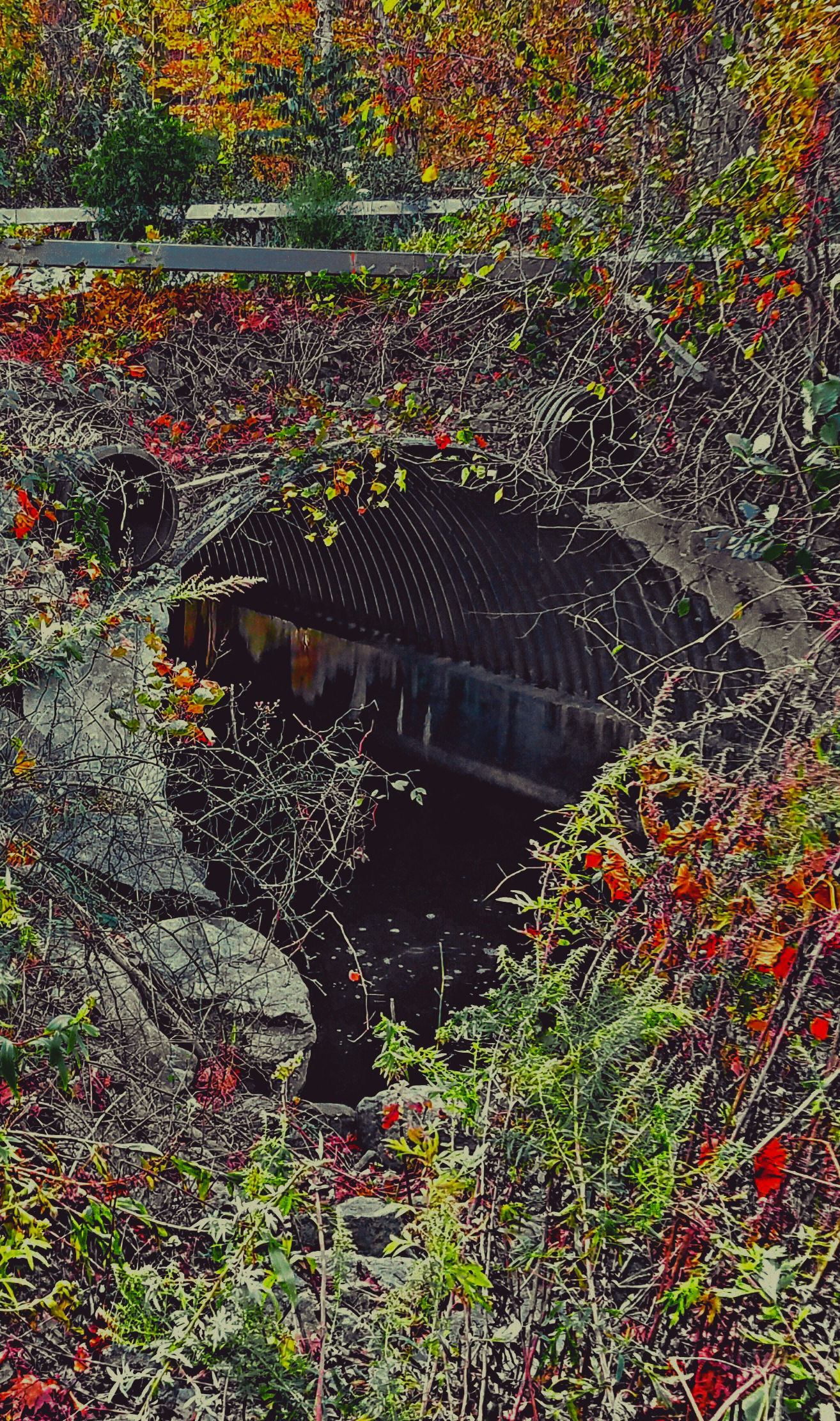
Pocantico River entering the Old Sleepy Hollow Road culvert

From there, it flows southwestward again. At Old Sleepy Hollow Road it enters Rockefeller State Park Preserve, at over 1,400 acres (570 ha) the largest of the three protected areas the river flows through. The road continues to parallel it on the east as it turns south; on the west it is paralleled by the preserve's Pocantico River Trail, which follows it for a mile and a half (2.4 km). All three cross under Phelps Way (State Route 117) and turn south.

Within the preserve, the river meanders between hills amidst woodland interrupted by large clearings. Small stone bridges (built by the Rockefellers) carry several of the preserve's trails across the river. About 600 feet (180 m) after entering the preserve, the Pocantico crosses into the village of Sleepy Hollow. A short distance to the south, it receives Rockefeller Creek from the Pocantico Hills to the east. It bends north, away from the road, to receive its last named tributary, Gory Brook, from the north, where it turns abruptly south again. After another quarter-mile (400 m) it passes under the massive Mill River Culvert of the Old Croton Aqueduct, and leaves the preserve, continuing straight through a steep, narrow wooded ravine in a slightly southwesterly direction.

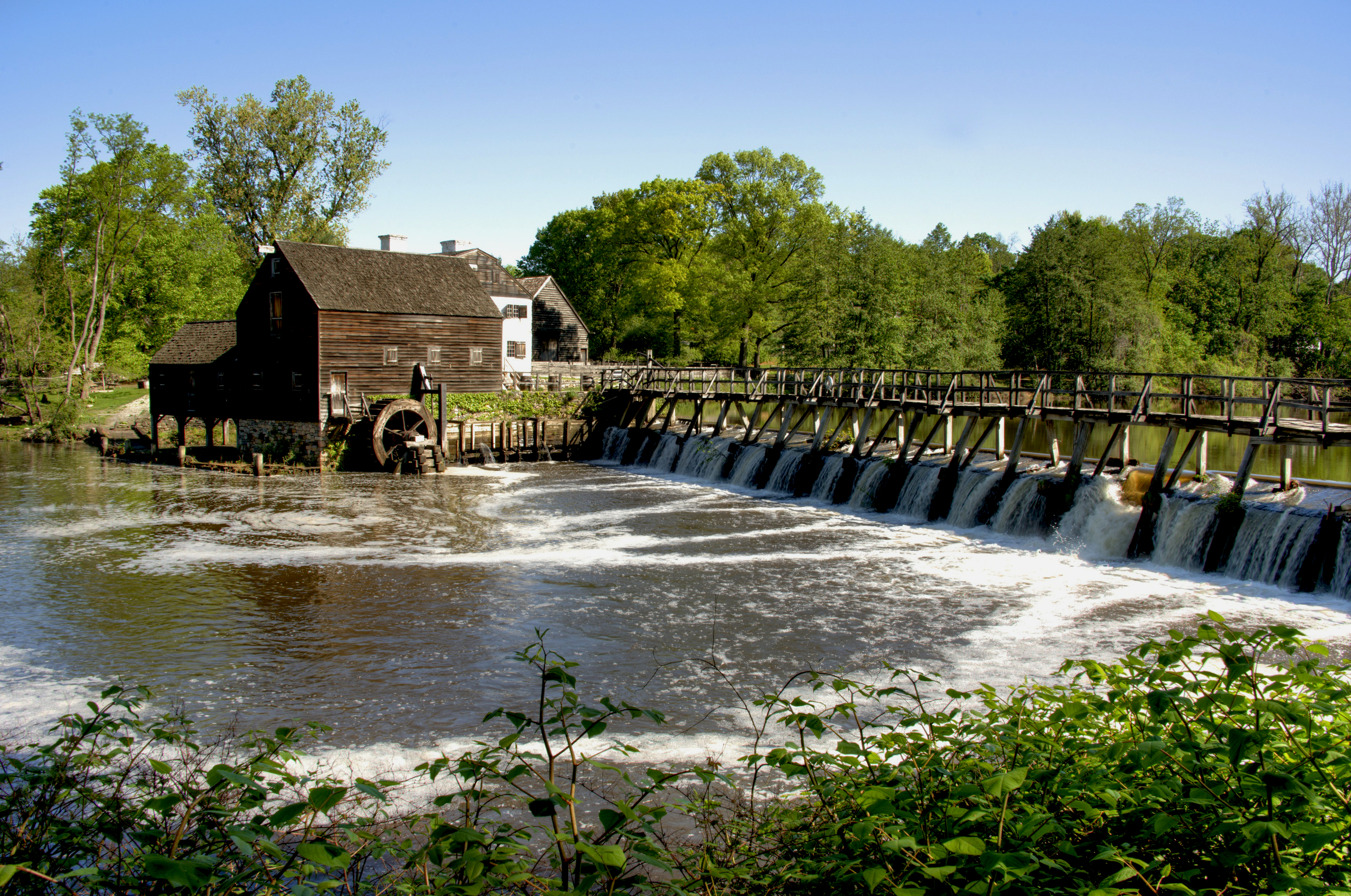
The river, spillway, and impoundment at the Philipsburg Manor House

As it flows between Sleepy Hollow Cemetery to the west and the village's Douglas Park to the east, the river drops below 50 feet (15 m) in elevation. On the north edge of another residential neighborhood, it bends eastward. After flowing under U.S. Route 9, it is again impounded, creating the mill pond at the Philipsburg Manor House, another NHL.

From that outlet, it meanders northwest past a residential development at the site of the former Tarrytown Truck Assembly plant, widening into a flood plain as it does. It bends north to pass another village park on the east, then north around that to divide the park from the residential neighborhood of Philipse Manor to its north. After flowing under the railroad tracks used by Metro-North's Hudson Line and Amtrak's Empire Service, it flows under the entrance road to Sleepy Hollow's Kingsland Point Park and empties into the Hudson River.

== Watershed ==
The Pocantico's 16-square-mile (41 km^{2}) watershed covers areas of Ossining, Mount Pleasant, and New Castle, including Briarcliff Manor and Sleepy Hollow. It includes 436 acres (176 ha) of mapped freshwater wetlands and eleven dams. Approximately 14,866 people live within the watershed. It is largely suburban, but also contains parks, forests and wildlife, highways, utilities, and institutions.

== History ==
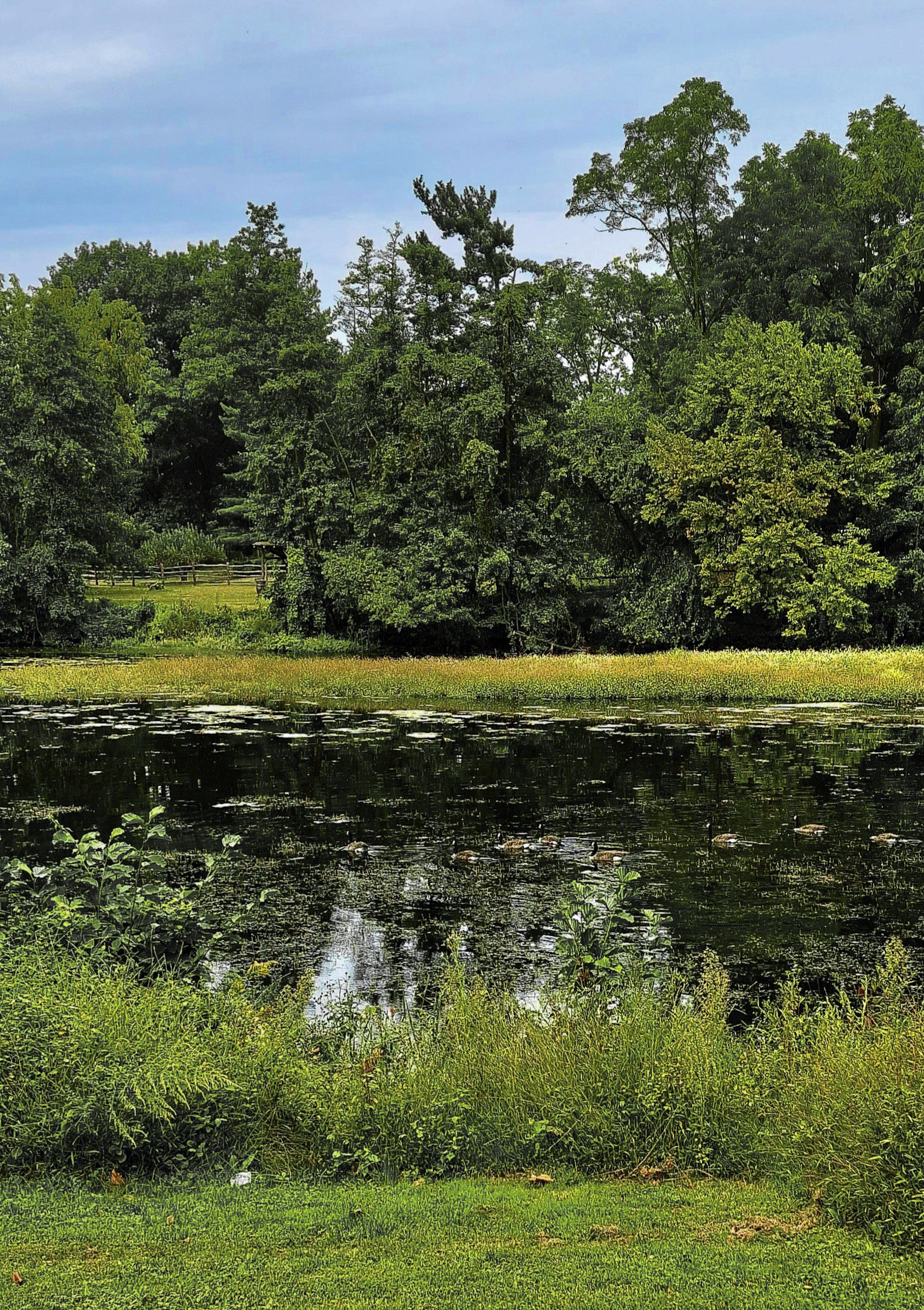
Lower course of Pocantico River – part of the area which the early Dutch colonists named "Slapershaven," or "Sleepers' Haven."

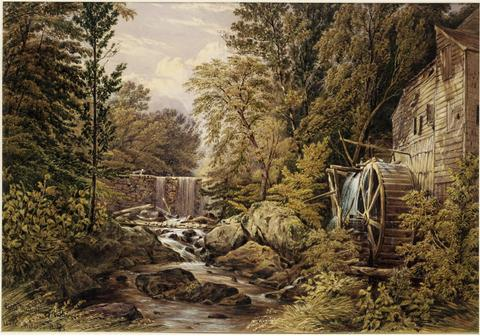
Carl's Mill on the Pocantico River, Sleepy Hollow by William Rickarby Miller (1851), depicting a small mill on the river that was one of the early landmarks of the Sleepy Hollow area; it vanished some time before 1893. (Note: The mill was described as a ruin in 1899.)

The Wecquaesgeek, a Munsee-speaking band of Wappinger people, established their primary settlement around the mouth of a river in present-day Dobbs Ferry. They also had a village at the mouth of the Pocantico River called Alipconk, meaning "place of elms". The river historically set the dividing line between Mount Pleasant and Ossining.

The river was once called "the Mill River" by the English settlers; the name survived in that of the Mill River Culvert of the historic Old Croton Aqueduct (it towers over the river near Sleepy Hollow Cemetery). The Native Americans called the river Pocanteco, a derivative of the Algonquin term Pockóhantès, meaning a "run between two hills". The Dutch called it the Sleepy Haven Kill. Dutch colonist Adriaen van der Donck's Beschrijvinge van Nieu Nederlandt, published in Amsterdam in 1655, referred to the Pocantico River as "Slapershaven" (Sleepers' Haven). The Anglicized term "Sleepy Hollow" grew to apply to the Pocantico's river valley and later to the village of North Tarrytown in particular; the village changed its official name to Sleepy Hollow in 1996.

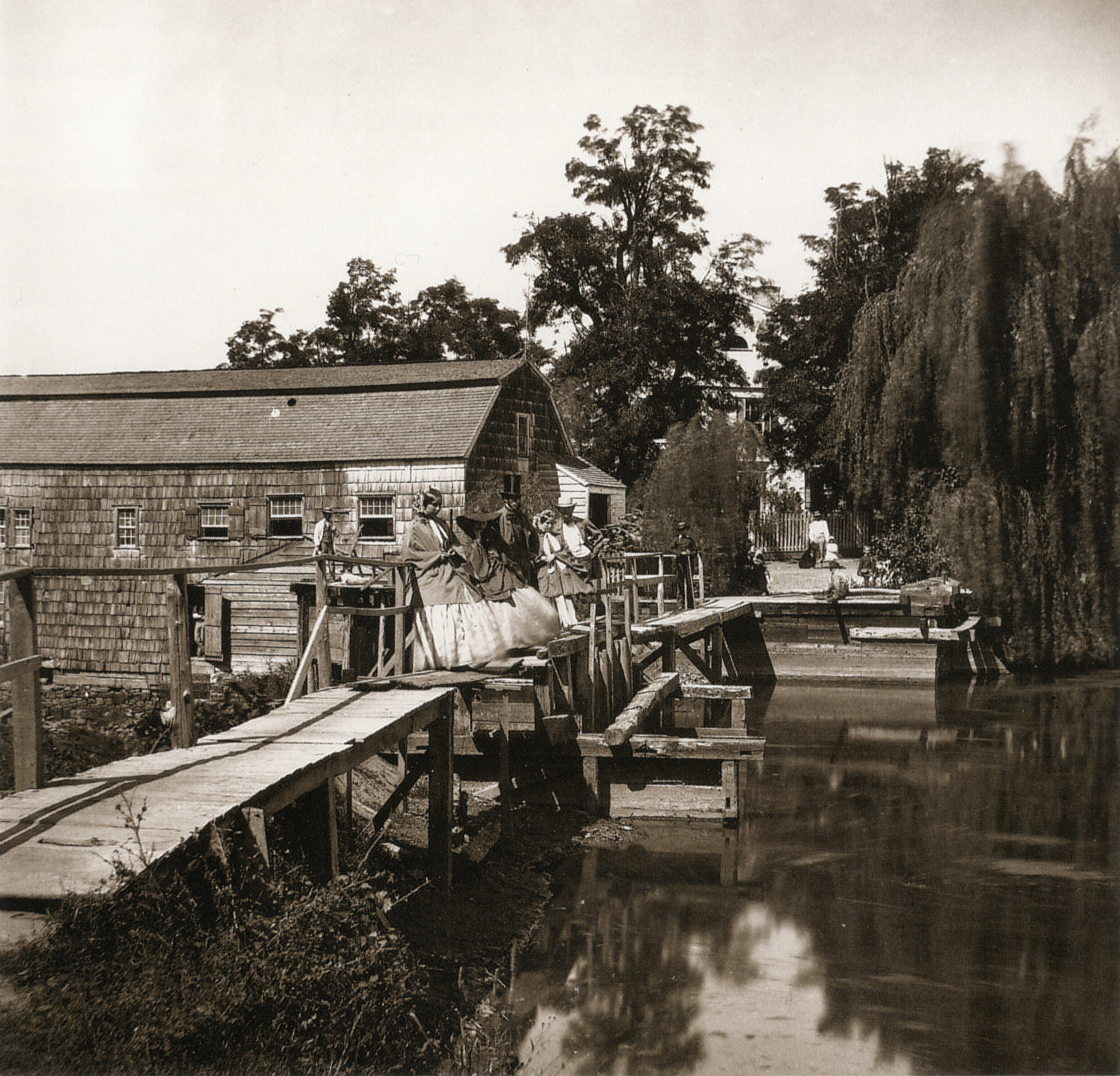
William England's 1859 stereoview of the mill and millpond at the Philipsburg Manor House

Frederick Philipse moved to the area and started purchasing land in the late 1600s, eventually establishing the vast Philipsburg Manor. He founded his country seat at the mouth of the Pocantico River and built a watermill, with a millpond, on the river. A small community had already been established there when he arrived in 1683. The settlement became known as the Upper Mills.

A ship called the Roebuck, which transported cargo to and from New York City, ended up in the river, where its keel was scavenged by the miller at the mill of the Philipsburg Manor House site.

Around the late 1890s, Walter W. Law and Briarcliff Farms deepened the river for a length of 2 miles (3 km), taking out the rifts so the stream would flow and the swamps adjacent to the river would drain. The workers also cut rock and took out trees that lined the swamps to reclaim land for farming.

Before mechanical refrigeration was introduced, ice harvested from Pocantico Lake in winter was used by stores in Tarrytown and North Tarrytown (present-day Sleepy Hollow) to keep food from spoiling.

1920s expansions of the North Tarrytown Assembly, a large General Motors automobile factory in Sleepy Hollow, involved rerouting the lower Pocantico River north of the site to follow the path of a pre-existing creek. The plant also completed the filling-in of the Pocantico Bay and adjacent swamps, which had been started in the 1840s to support the construction of the Hudson River Railroad.

During 1999's Hurricane Floyd, the Pocantico was blocked by fallen trees and almost washed away the Philipsburg Manor historic site; about 70 employees of the parent organization Historic Hudson Valley assisted in its protection, along with the site's curators and security guards, and other village residents.

== Ecology and environment ==
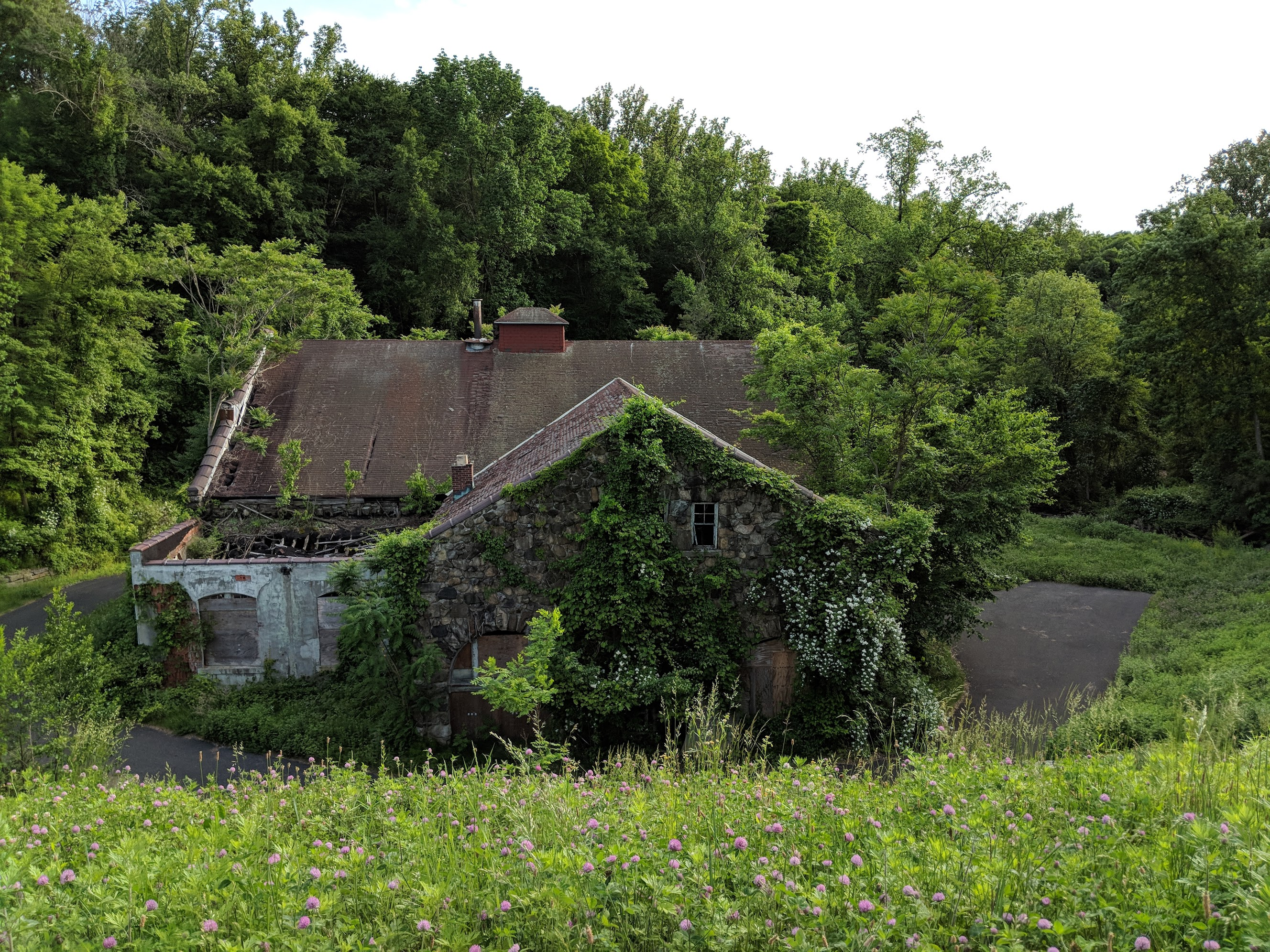
Abandoned water treatment facility of the New Rochelle Water Company in Pocantico Lake Park

The organization Riverkeeper collects samples in three Pocantico River tributaries. The river downstream of Pocantico Lake is a habitat for brown trout. The river is stocked each spring; 540 brown trout were stocked in 2013, and 630 were anticipated to be stocked in the river in 2014. After a bacteria test completed on October 4, 2014, the river was found to have an Enterococcus bacteria count of greater than 2420, indicating high amounts of fecal matter in the water. Other tests of the river quality at the mouth of the river in Sleepy Hollow also contain high levels of Enterococcus bacteria. In fact, the high bacteria counts throughout the river were taken both after wet and dry weather. Dry weather tends to result in lower bacteria counts because less flooding results in less overflow from sewage treatment plants. The high levels of bacteria in the river resulted in beach advisories for the entire river. In 2014, $9.9 million was put aside to repair the Tarrytown sewage treatment plant in order to improve water quality in the region.

A Westchester County water quality study of the Pocantico River found that the chemical pollutants in the water met most of New York State Standards. The river met state standards on nitrate and phosphate levels, resulting in little cultural eutrophication in the water. Dissolved oxygen levels also met state standards with an average concentration of 9.853 milligrams per liter. Only the conductivity of the water failed state standards with conductivity levels averaging about three times the recommended levels.

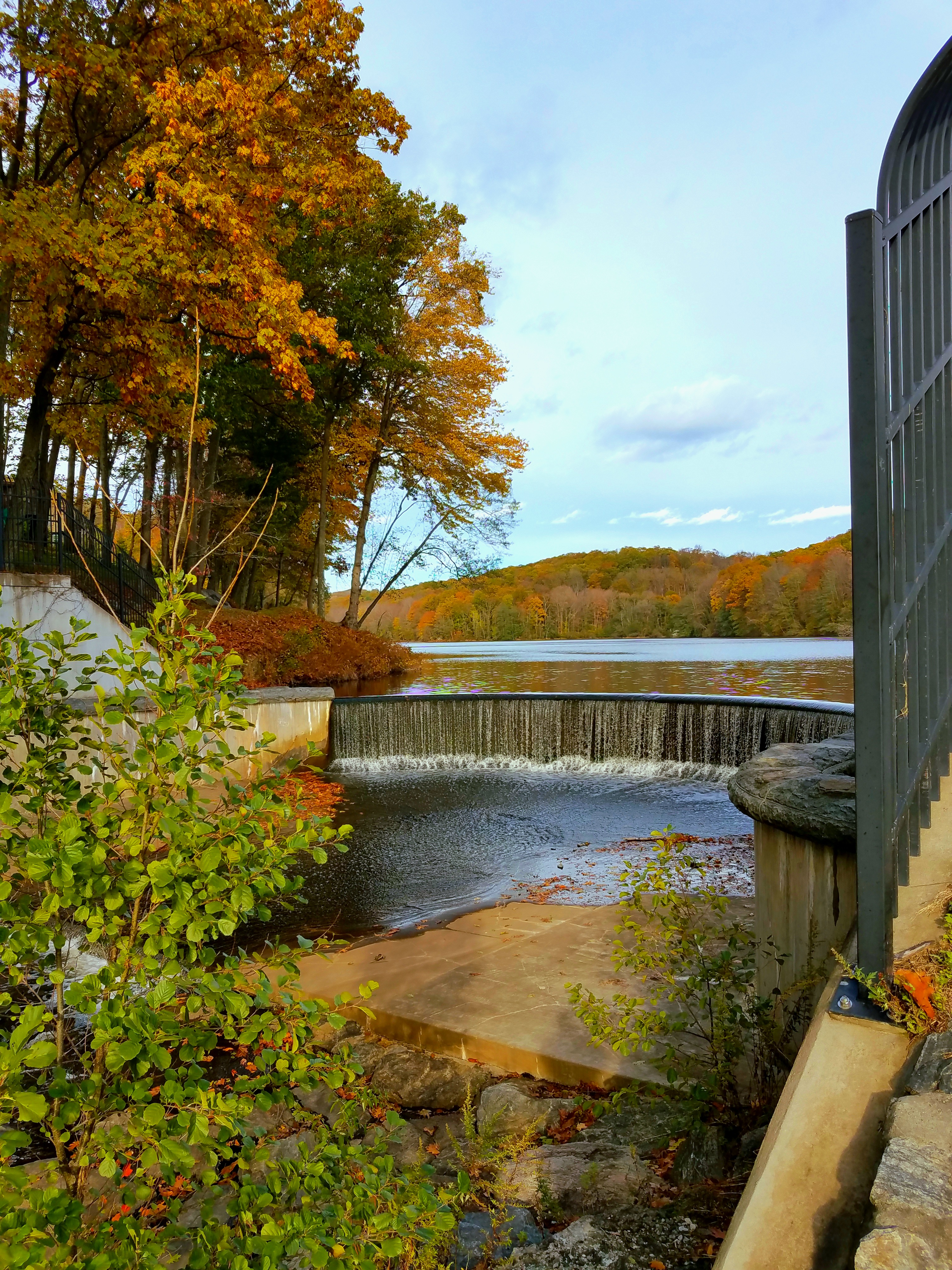
Pocantico Lake spillway

American eels enters the river from the Hudson every spring, moving upstream over the course of one to three years. The eels often accumulate under a dam in Sleepy Hollow, and approximately 10% make it past the dam. The eels move upstream where the habitat is preferable, with lower polychlorinated biphenyl pollution, fewer parasites, faster growth rates for the eels, and a higher percentage of females in the population. Other species in the river include white perch, white sucker, yellow perch, golden shiner, and alewife, only in small numbers.

Adjacent to the river is a protected area known as Pocantico Lake Park. The park contains hiking trails as well as an abandoned water treatment plant from the New Rochelle Water Company. Nearby land fronting Pocantico Lake was purchased by a housing developer in 2020; local residents subsequently began a campaign to prevent the land from being used for more housing and protect the environment, including its supply of fresh water, and wildlife. As of 2023, a number of residents had pointed out flaws in the draft environmental impact statement.

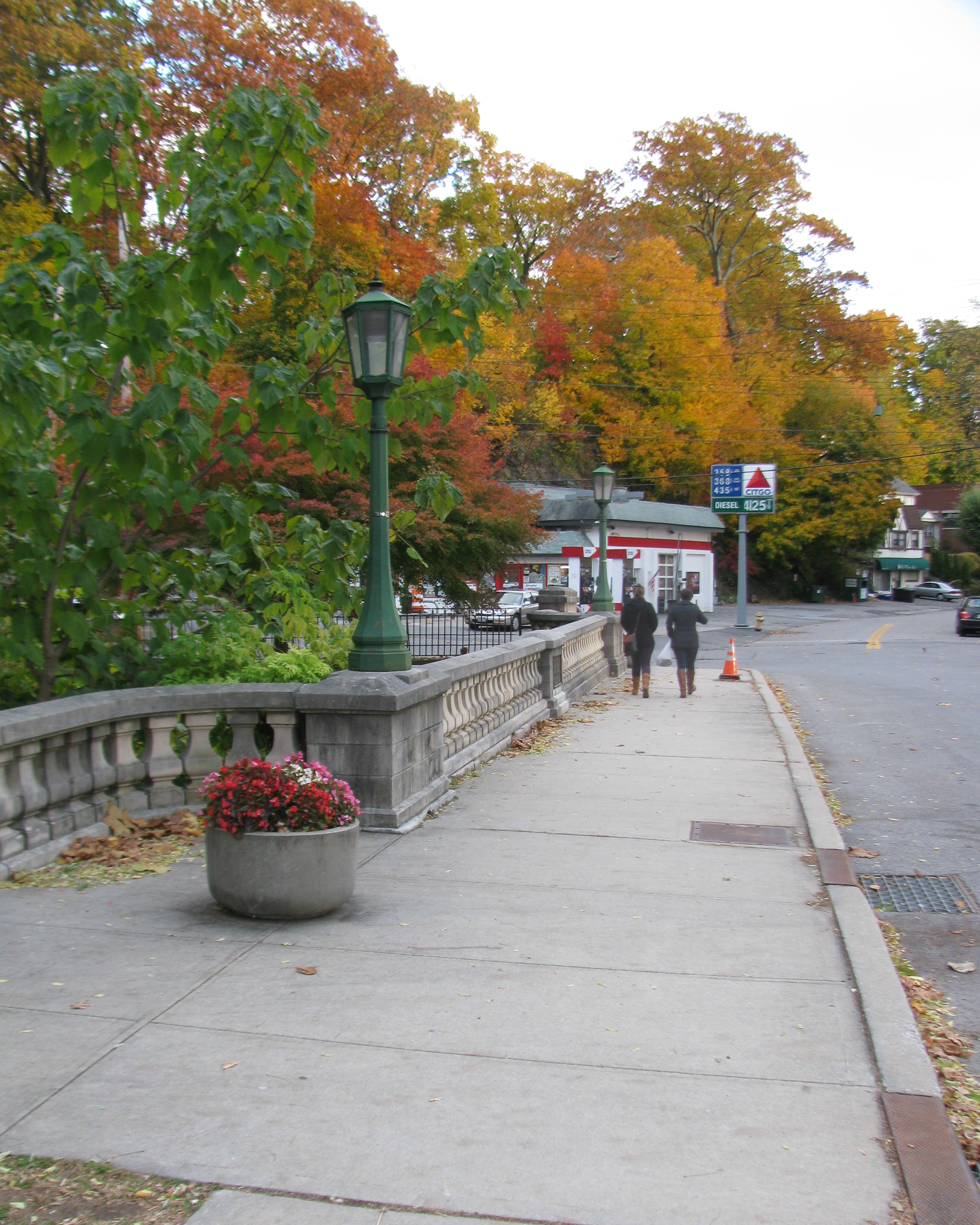
William Rockefeller funded U.S. Route 9's current bridge over the Pocantico in 1912.

== In popular culture ==
The dénouement of "The Legend of Sleepy Hollow" is set at a bridge over the Pocantico River in the area of the Old Dutch Church and Burying Ground in Sleepy Hollow. (Note: The bridge is presumed to be part of the Albany Post Road, now part of U.S. Route 9; at least five bridges are known to have stood there.) As well, Washington Irving makes frequent mention of the Pocantico River in Chronicle III of his short story anthology Wolfert's Roost.

The delighted historian pursued his explorations far into the foldings of the hills where the Pocantico winds its wizard stream among the mazes of its old Indian haunts; sometimes running darkly in pieces of woodland beneath balancing sprays of beech and chestnut: sometimes sparkling between grassy borders in fresh green intervals; here and there receiving the tributes of silver rills which came whimpering down the hill sides from their parent springs. In a remote part of the Hollow, where the Pocantico forced its way down rugged rocks, stood Carl's mill, the haunted house of the neighborhood.

— Washington Irving, Wolfert's Roost, Chronicle III

=== Gallery ===
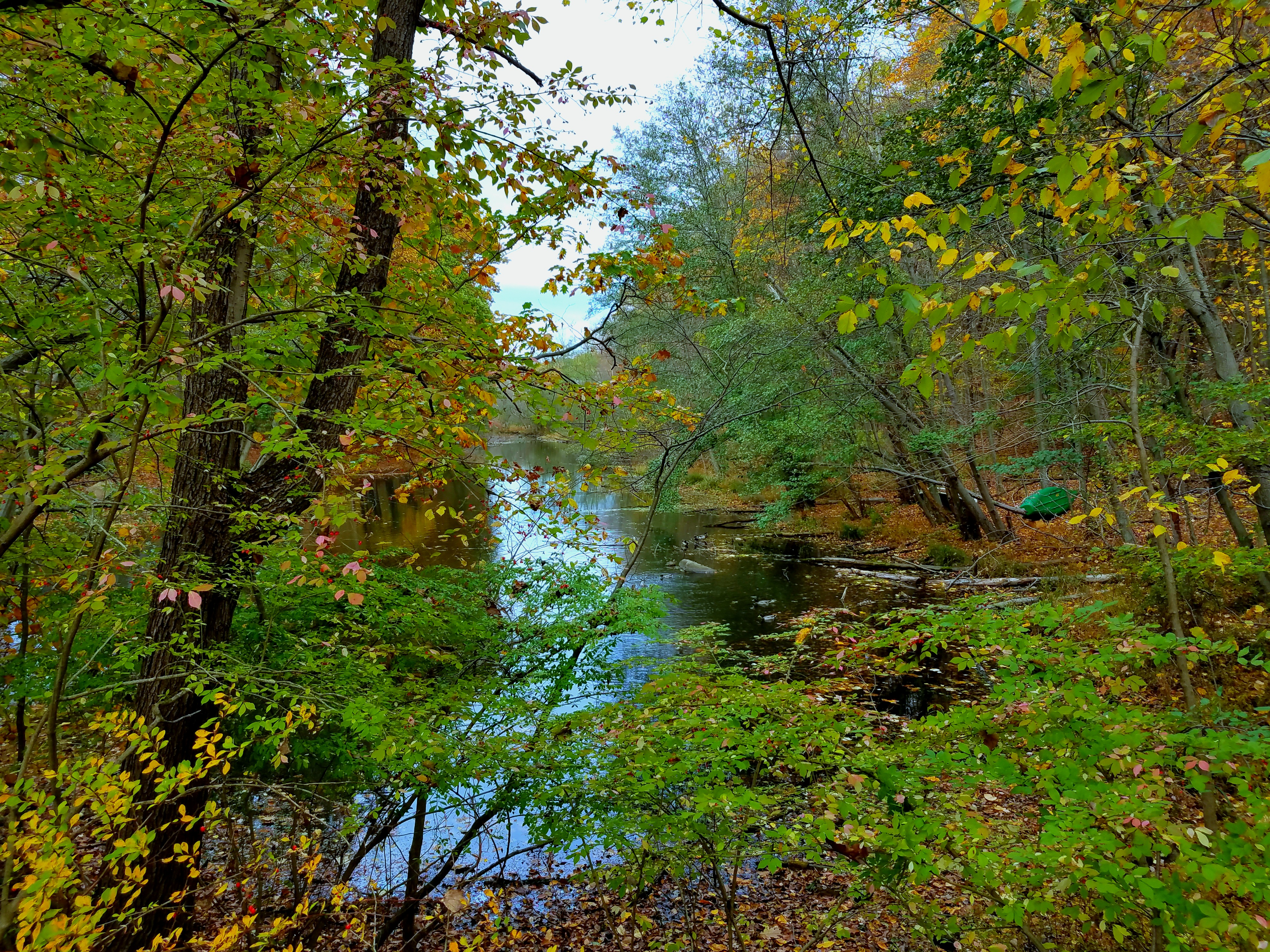
Swampy area north of Pocantico Lake

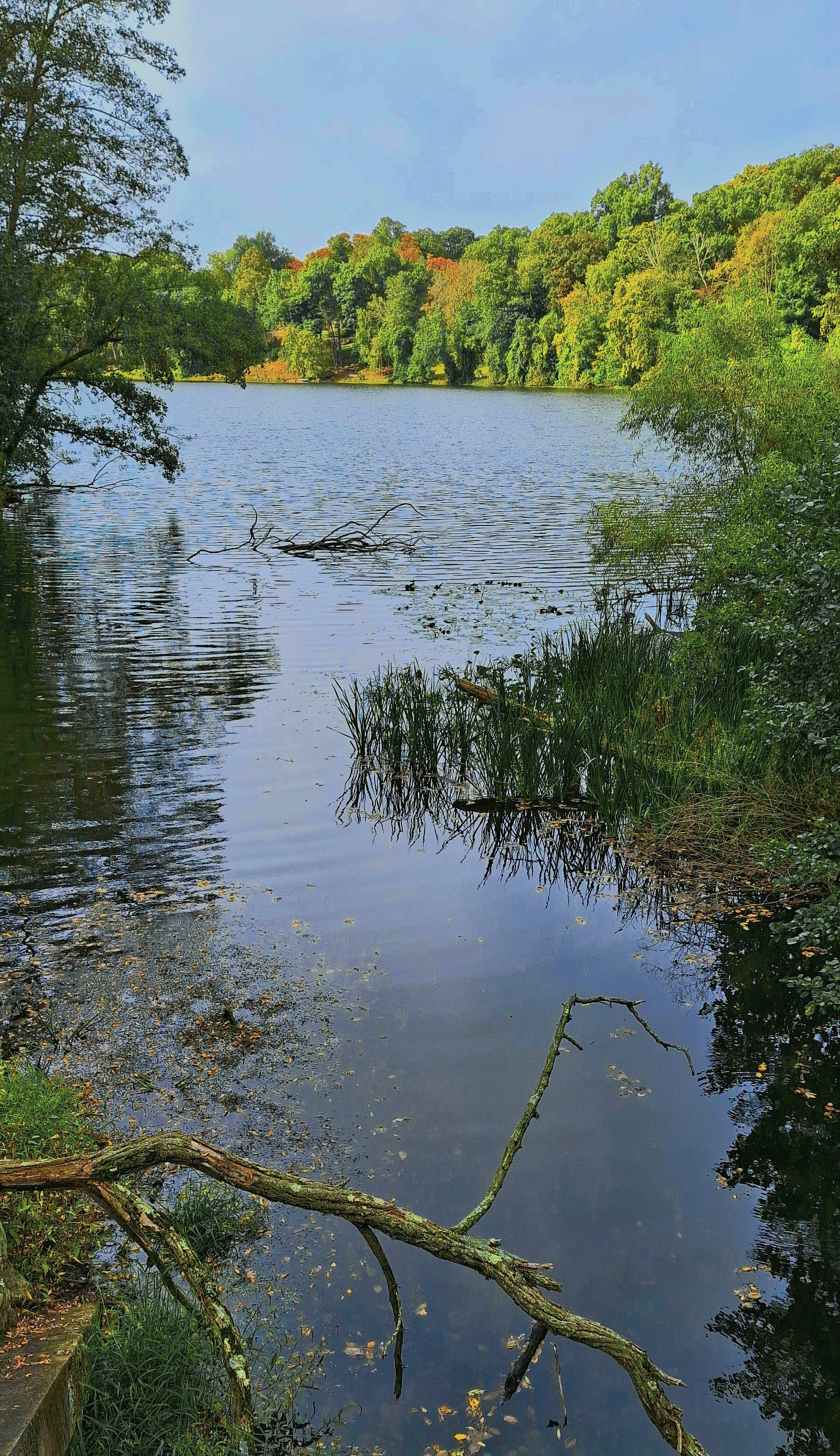
View of Pocantico Lake from the north

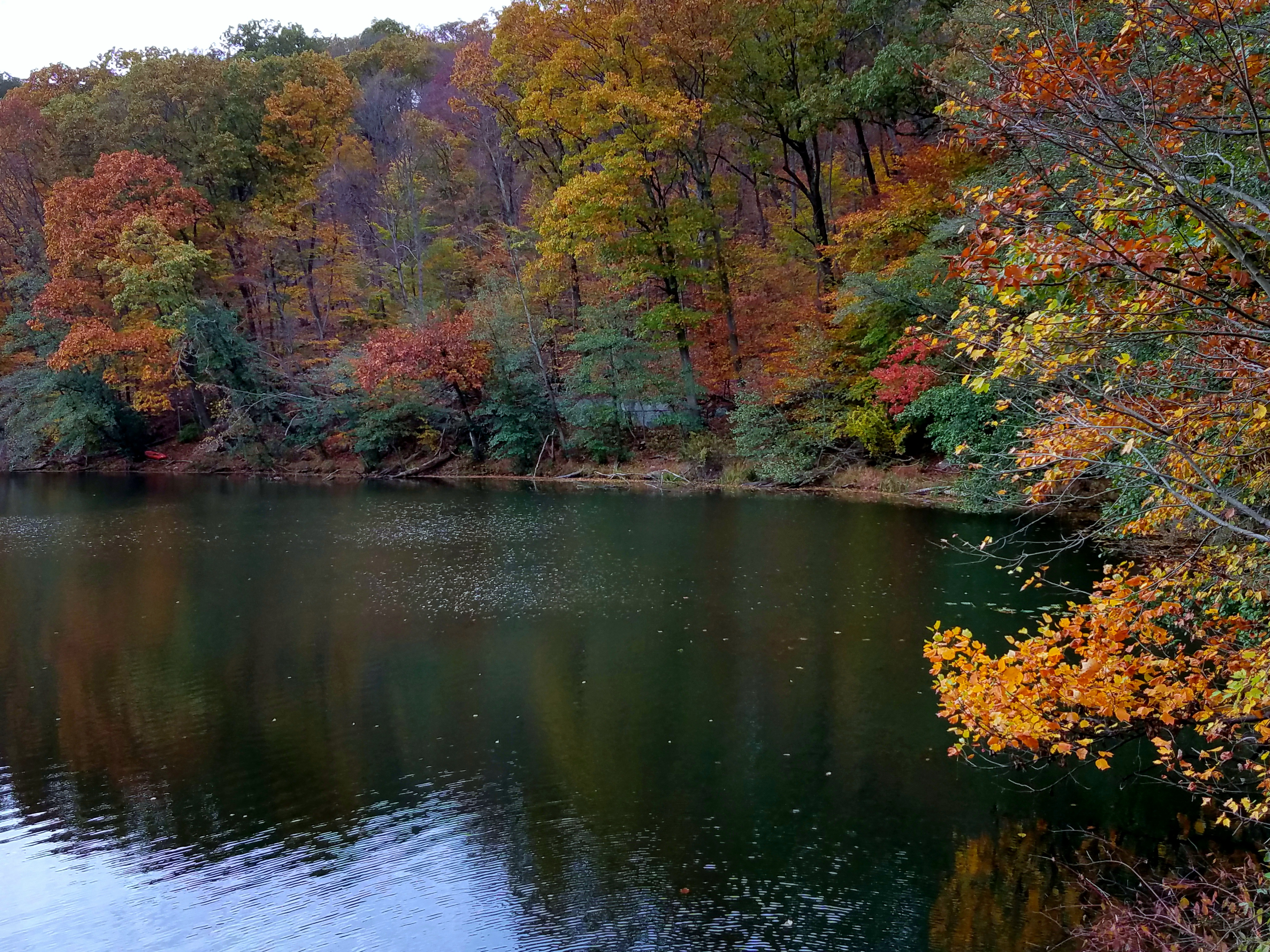
Western shore of Pocantico Lake

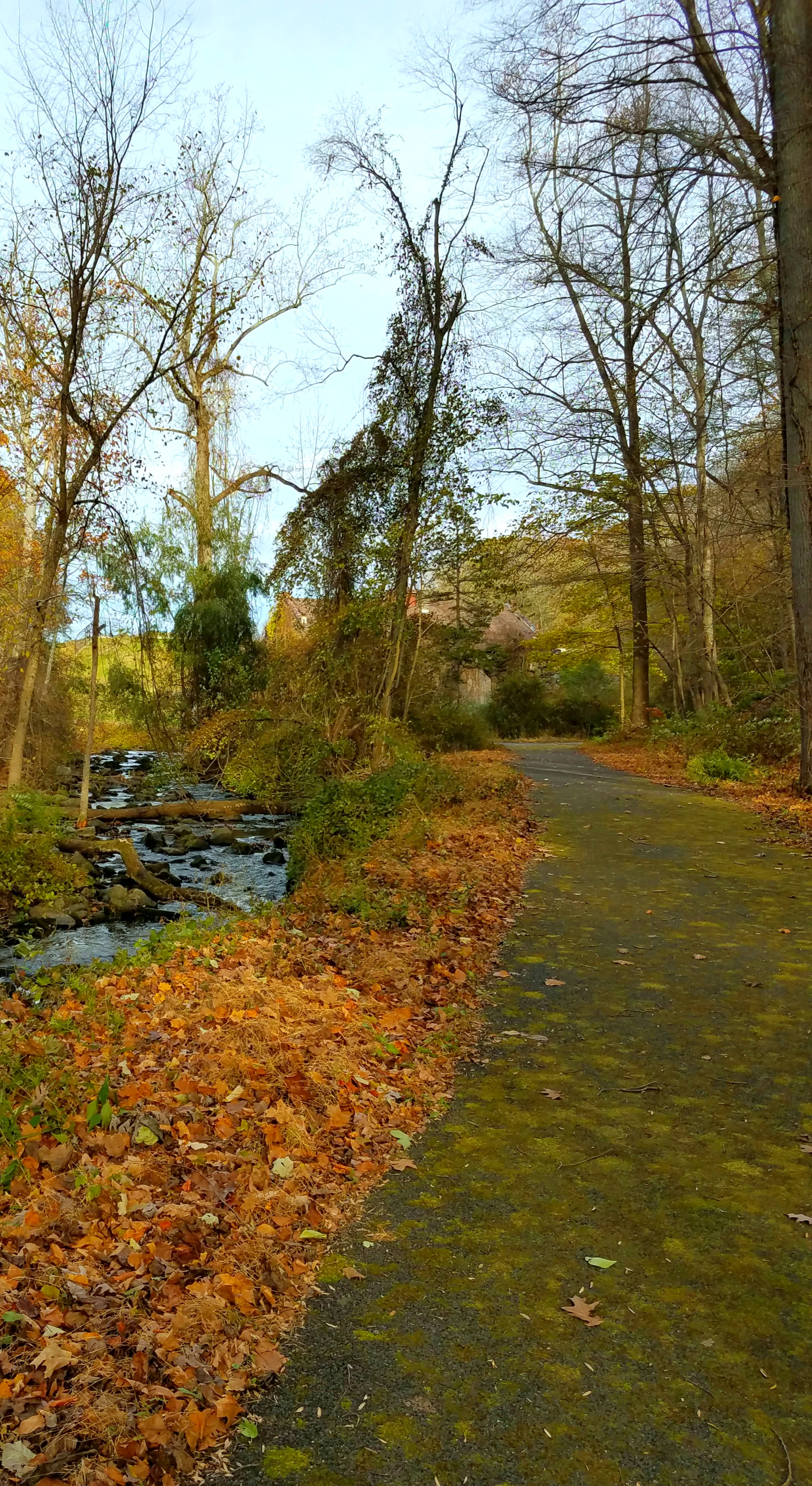
Pocantico Lake Trail

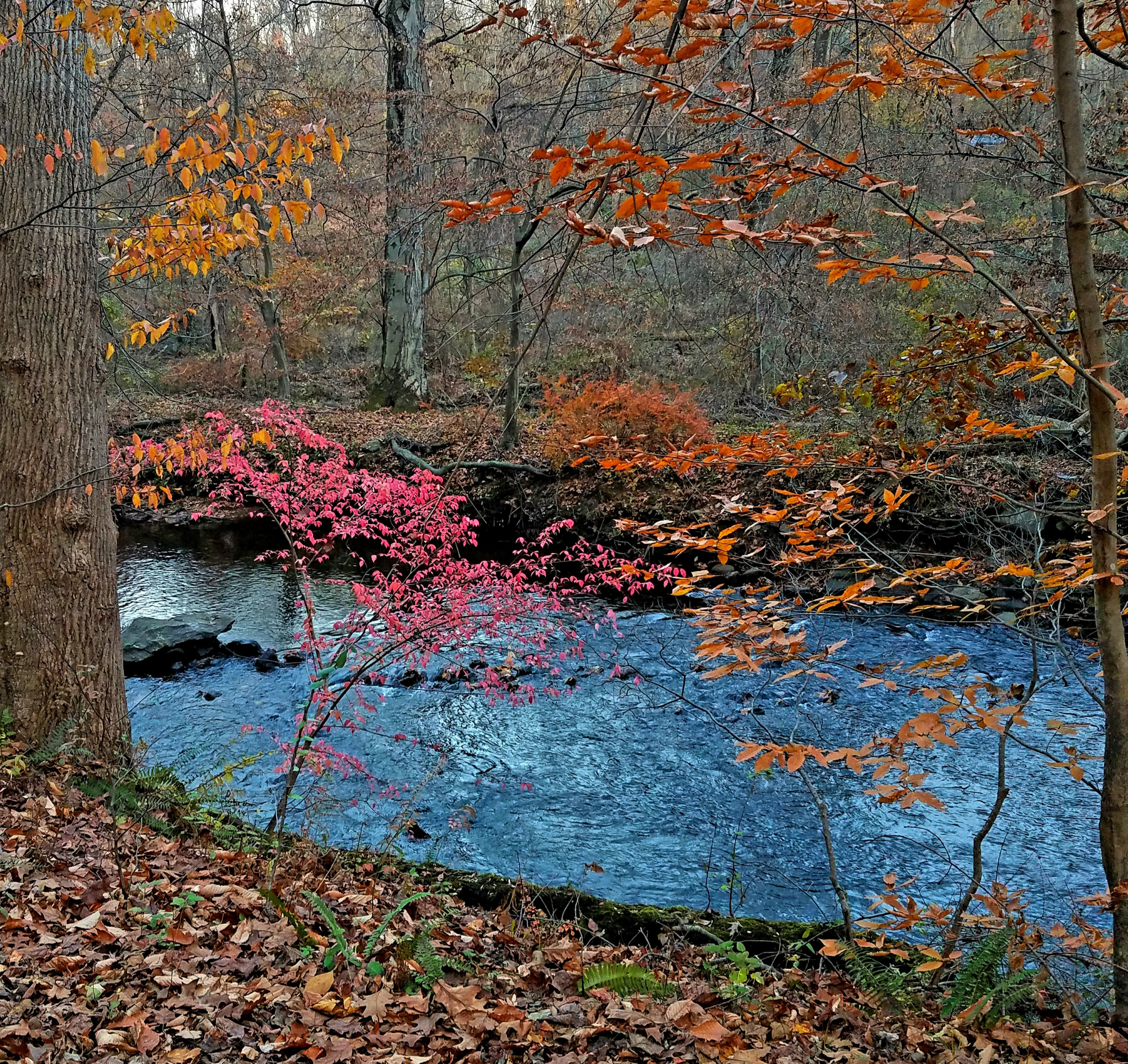
The river flowing through Rockefeller State Park Preserve

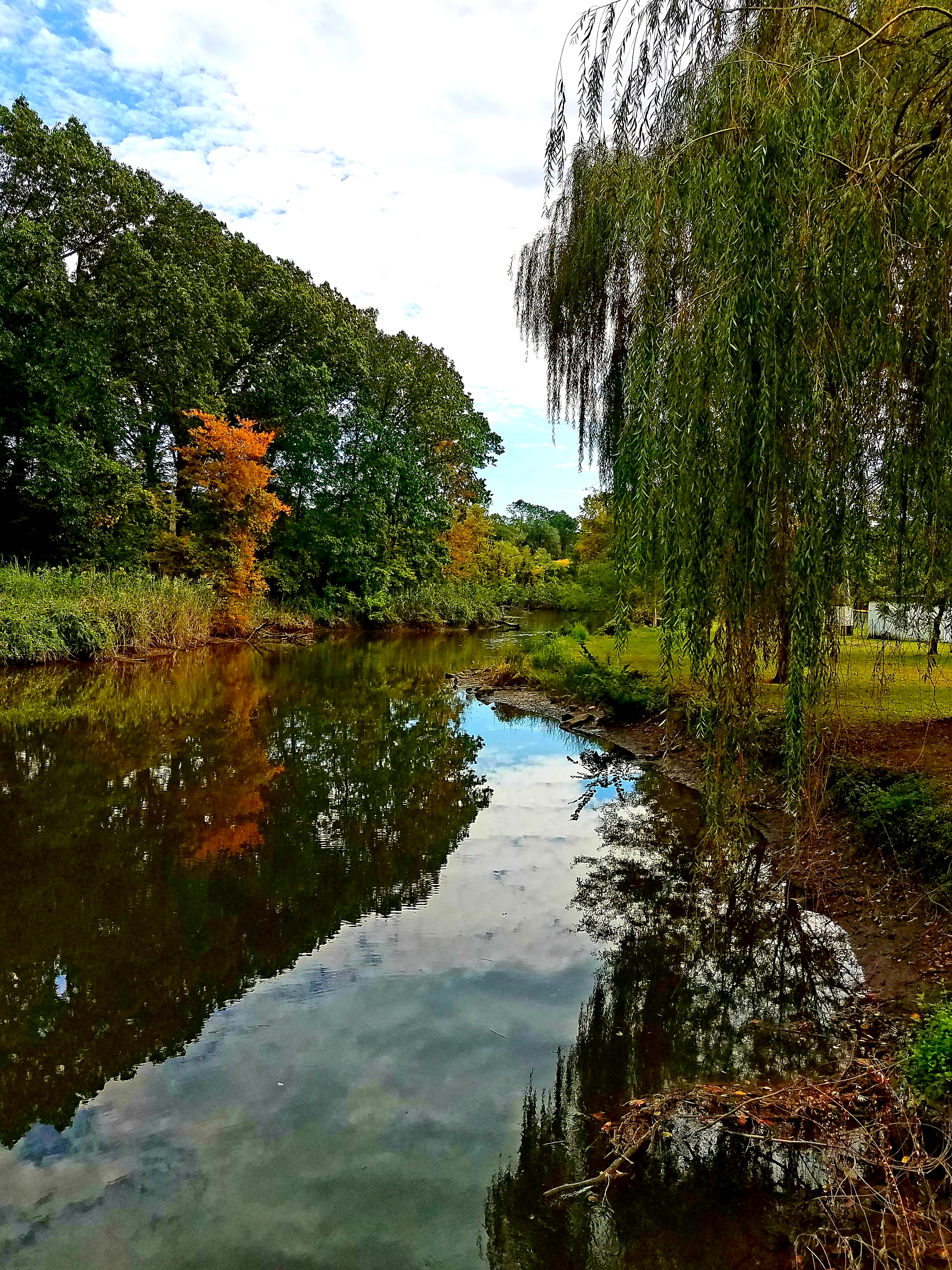
Lower Pocantico River, rerouted in the 1920s

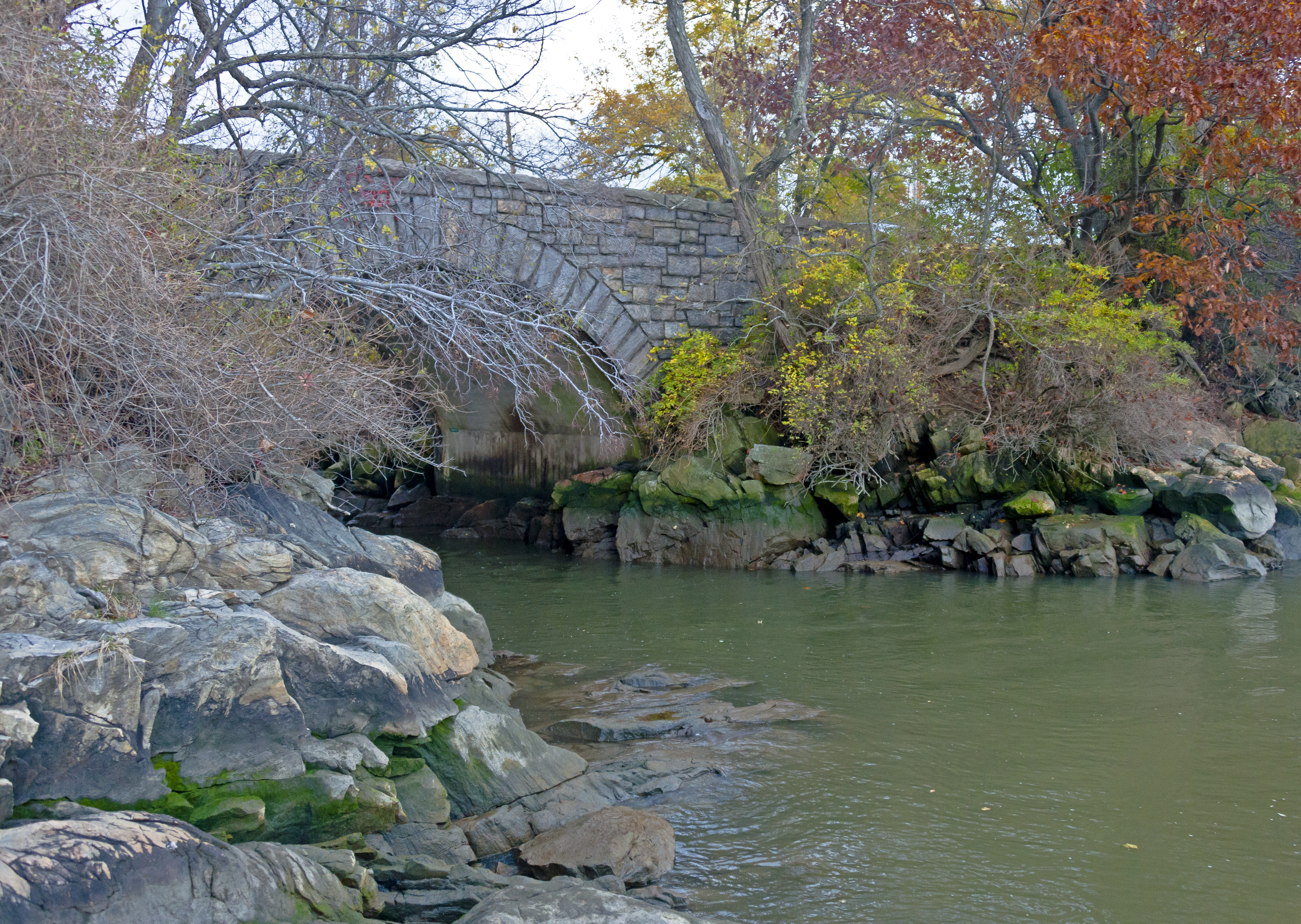
Mouth of Pocantico River at Kingsland Point Park, Sleepy Hollow

== See also ==
- List of rivers of New York
- Pocantico Hills, New York
