= Rockefeller State Park Preserve =

State park in New York state, United States

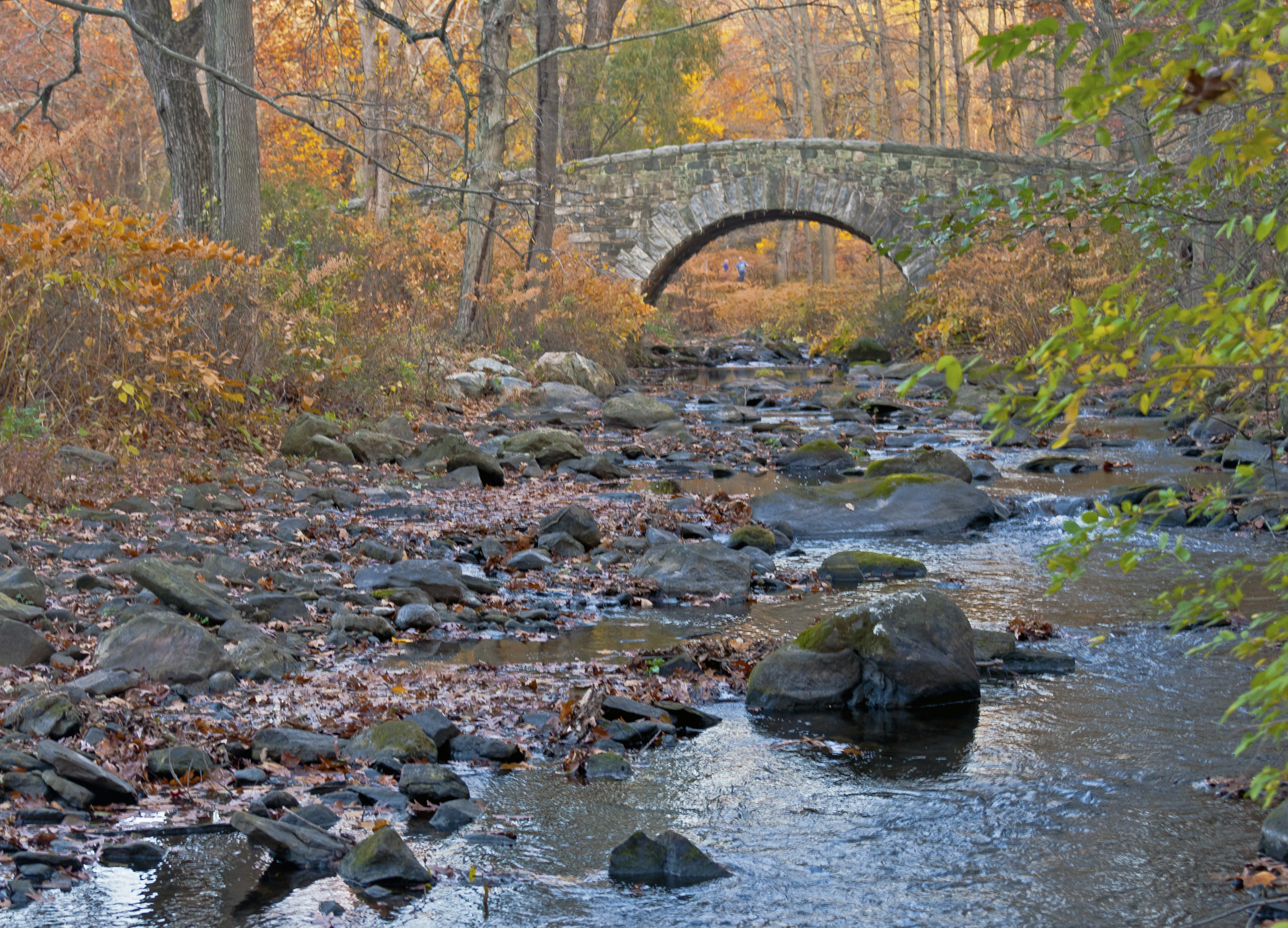
- The Pocantico River as it flows through the Preserve
- Interactive map of Rockefeller State Park Preserve
- Location: Westchester County, New York, US
- Coordinates: 41°6′42″N 73°50′11″W
- Area: 1,771 acres (7.17 km^{2})
- Created: 1983-2019
- Governing body: New York State Office of Parks, Recreation and Historic Preservation
- Website: parks.ny.gov/visit/state-parks/rockefeller-state-park-preserve

Rockefeller State Park Preserve is a state park in Mount Pleasant, New York, in the eastern foothills of the Hudson River in Westchester County. Common activities in the park include horse-riding, walking, jogging, running, bird-watching, and fishing. This wooded area near the present-day village of Sleepy Hollow has a rich history; the land was donated to the state of New York over time by the Rockefeller family beginning in 1983. A separate section of the park, called the Rockwood Hall section, fronts the Hudson River. Formerly the property of William Rockefeller, it has been in use as a New York state park since the early 1970s. In 2019, the estate of the late David Rockefeller donated a final 346-acre parcel to the preserve; this gift increased the total acreage to its current 1,771-acre (7.17 km^{2}) size. The park's trails, carriage roads, and bridges were planned and laid out by John D. Rockefeller Sr. and John D. Rockefeller Jr. in the first half of the 20th century, when the land was part of their Pocantico estate.

In 2018, the park was added to New York's State Register of Historic Places.

== Features ==
Rockefeller State Park Preserve is designated by the National Audubon Society as an Important Bird Area with over 200 species, and is known for its wildlife, carriage trails, and scenic vistas. The park's 55 miles (89 km) of carriage roads allow visitors to explore the various habitats of the park, which include open meadows, dense forest, meandering brooks, wetlands, and the 24-acre (97,000 m^{2}) Swan Lake. The lake was created in the early 20th century by damming a tributary of the Pocantico River to enhance the scenic, pastoral landscape of the Rockefeller estate. It is encircled by the approximately 1-mile Brothers’ Path.

The Preserve abuts the Old Croton Aqueduct State Historic Park and Sleepy Hollow Cemetery. It also abuts extensive private land owned by the Rockefeller family, which is open to the public. The trails in the private area (still in use by the Rockefeller family and also open to the public) connect with those in the state park.

Raven Rock, a large outcrop on Buttermilk Hill in the southeastern corner of the Preserve, is mentioned in Washington Irving's The Legend of Sleepy Hollow as being haunted by a woman in white who "was often heard to shriek on winter nights before a storm, having perished there in the snow". Rising sharply above the Saw Mill River Valley, Buttermilk Hill was an important lookout point during the American Revolution. The area, which is the setting for several ghost stories and historical strange occurrences, is popular for hiking and features several named trails.

Spook Rock is located in the Pocantico River section of the Preserve, in the eastern part of the park. Geologically, it is a glacial erratic. Long before European settlement, the large flat boulder served as a sacred meeting place or "council rock" where tribal leaders gathered for powwows and other ceremonies. In The Legend of Sleepy Hollow, Washington Irving made cryptic allusions to the area's ancient "powwows" and bewitched nature, contributing to its reputation as a "haunted" or "spooky" location. The rock is located near the reputed home of Hulda of Bohemia, who is also a staple of Sleepy Hollow lore and a possible inspiration for The Legend's “High German witch doctor.”

Another, much larger glacial erratic in the Preserve, is often referred to as the Pleasantville Glacial Erratic. It is somewhat tucked away from the main, heavily trafficked carriage roads, sitting in a natural "amphitheater" in the northwestern part of the Preserve. It is a massive boulder of ancient gneiss estimated to be over 600 million years old. It stands approximately 20 feet tall with a circumference of roughly 65 feet. The estimated weight of its visible, exposed portion is 8.5 to 20 tons; based on its dimensions, its total weight may be some 630 tons. The boulder was plucked from the peaks of the Hudson Highlands by the southward flow of the Late Wisconsin continental glacier and deposited in its current location approximately 10,000 to 30,000 years ago as the mile-thick ice sheet melted. Despite its immense weight, the boulder was significantly larger before glacial abrasion and plucking shaped its current form.

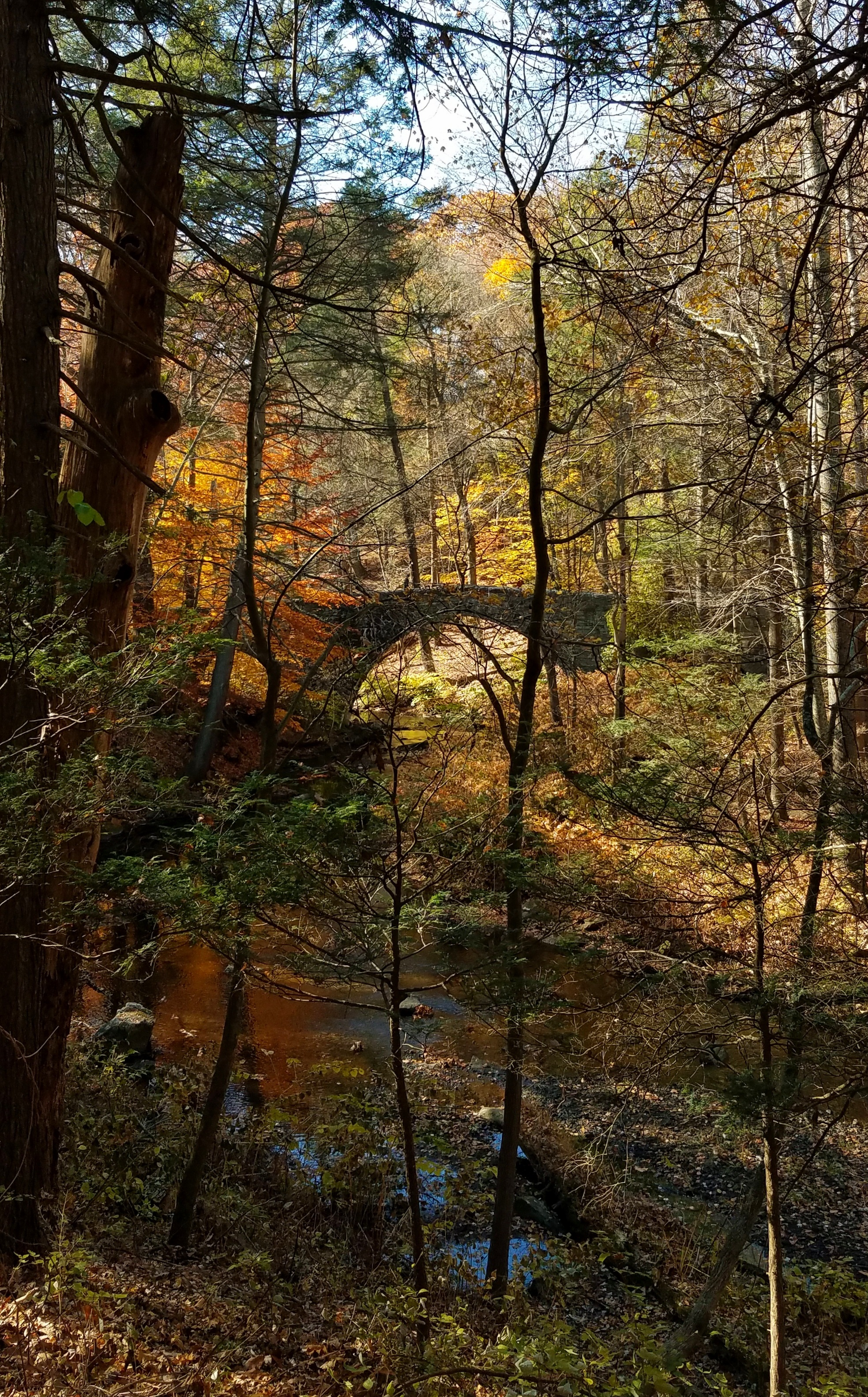
One of the 16 "Rockefeller bridges" in the Preserve

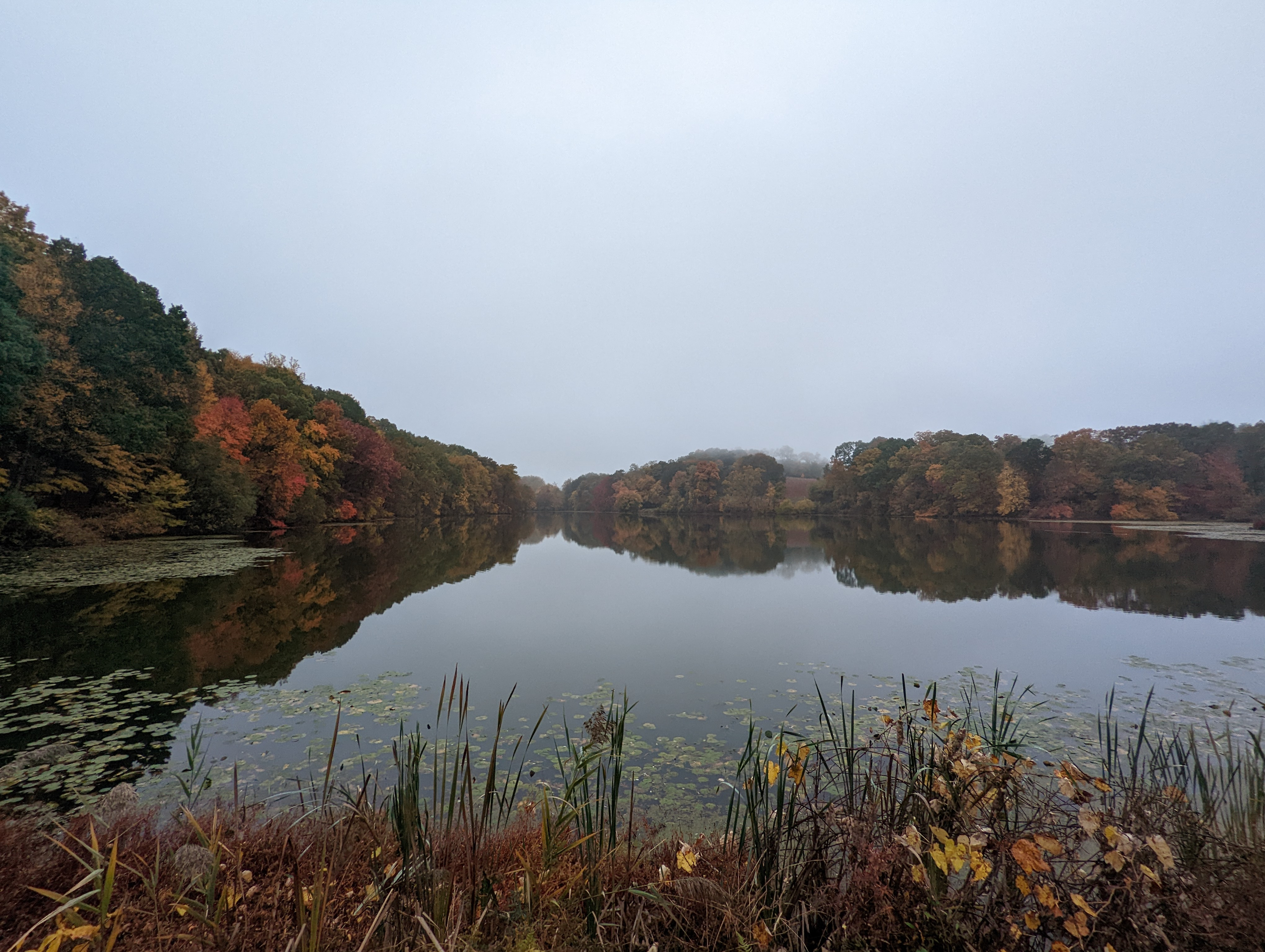
Swan Lake

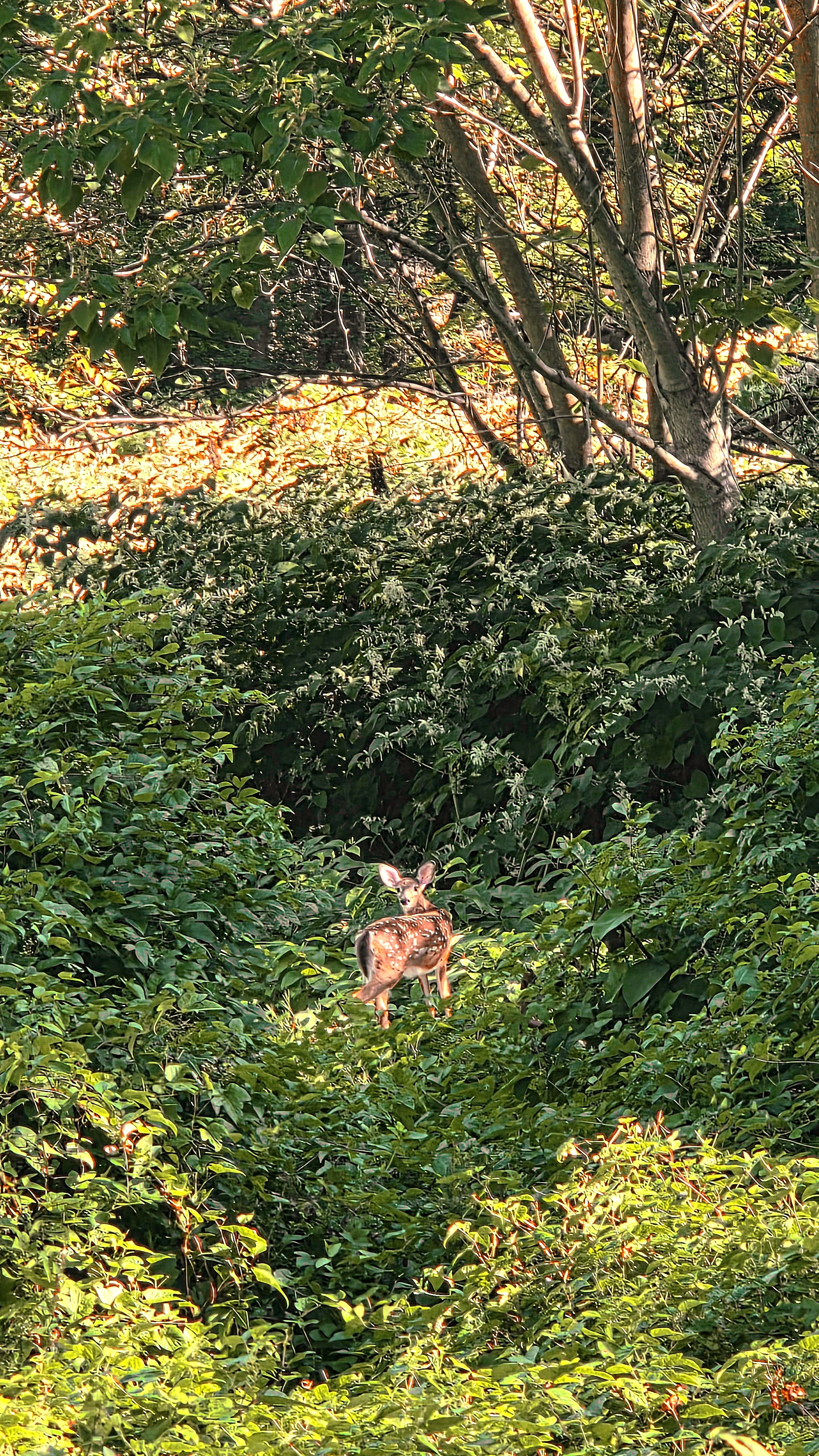
White-tailed deer fawn in the Preserve

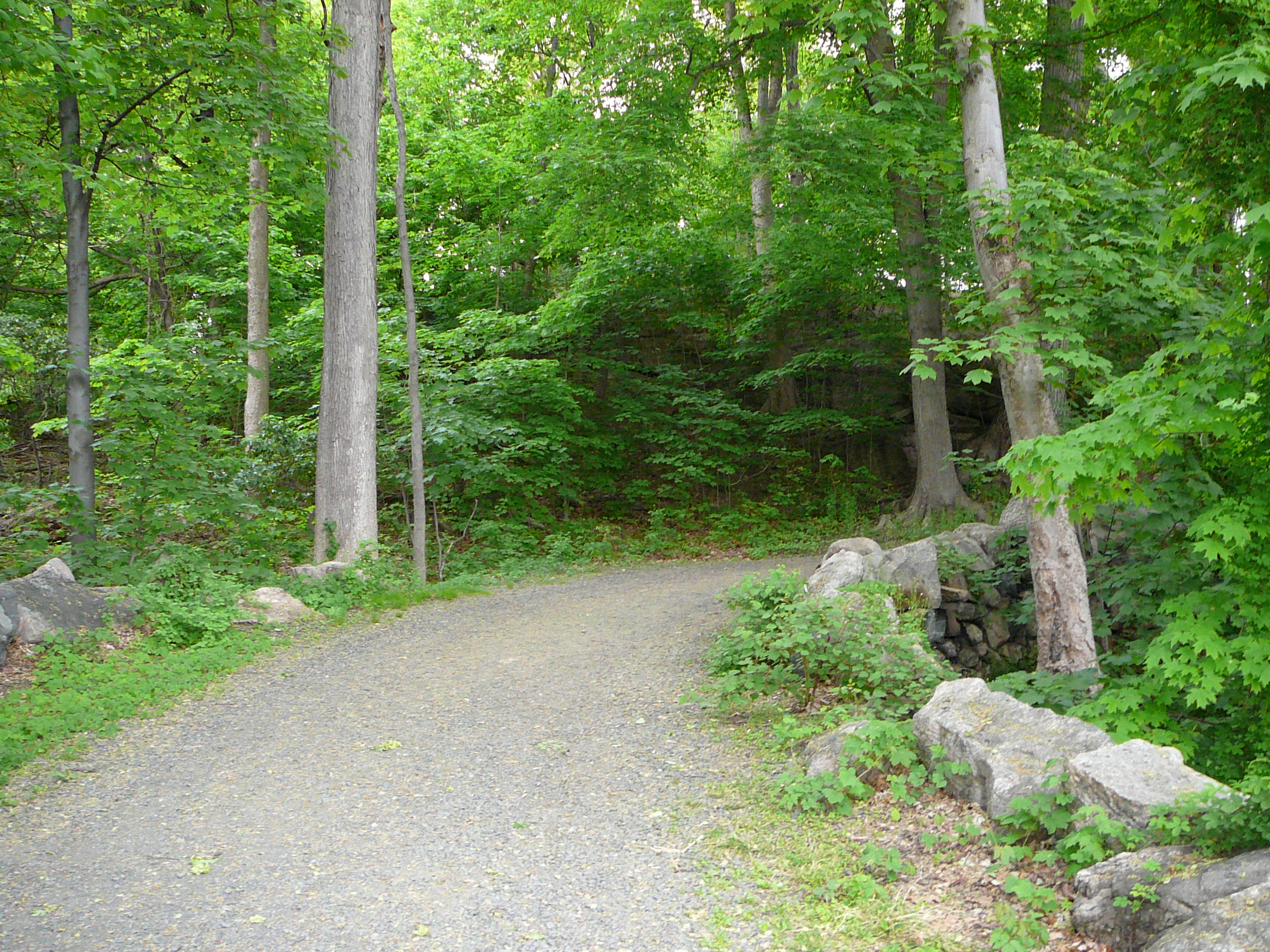
A typical carriage road

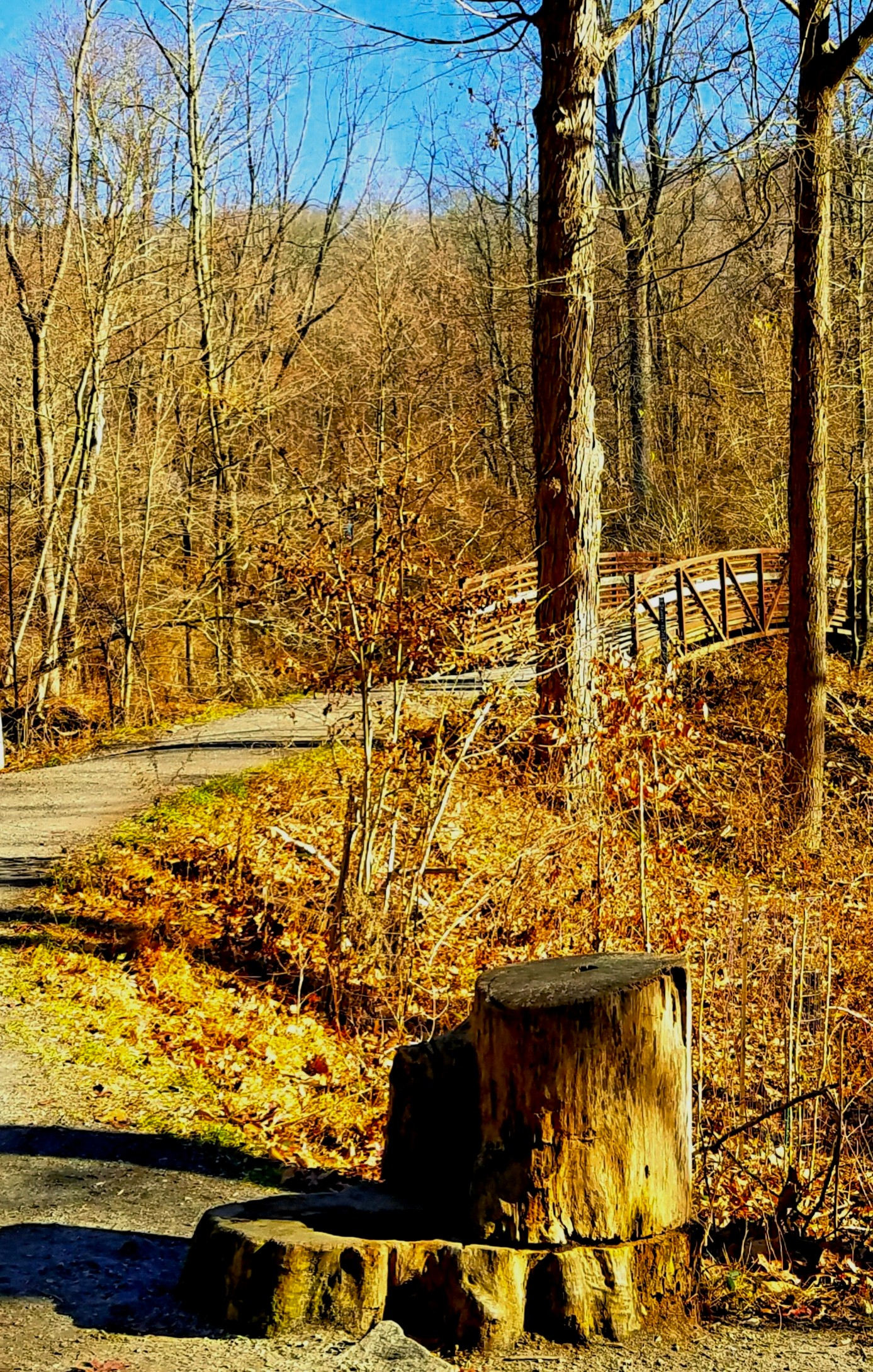
Wooden footbridge on the Old Sleepy Hollow Road Trail

The Preserve contains some of North America's tallest native hardwood trees. The Big Tree Loop with its towering tulip trees (some 150-foot-tall) and the tallest black oak in New York state (at 132 ft tall) is likely to be untouched since the 1860s.

Stone Barns Center for Food & Agriculture, "a nonprofit farm and educational center designed to demonstrate, teach and promote sustainable, community-based food production," is located within walking distance of the preserve. The pigs from Stone Barns often forage in the woods of the preserve. Cattle also graze the preserve's land.

The park is open year-round, from sunrise to sunset, with office hours from 9 a.m. to 4:30 p.m. The park's main entrance is on New York State Route 117. There is a $6.00 fee for parking. The Visitor Center has a small art gallery that frequently displays paintings and photographic art works of local artists. Additional access to the park trails is available from Sleepy Hollow Road and Bedford Road/Route 448 in Sleepy Hollow.

== Rockwood Hall ==
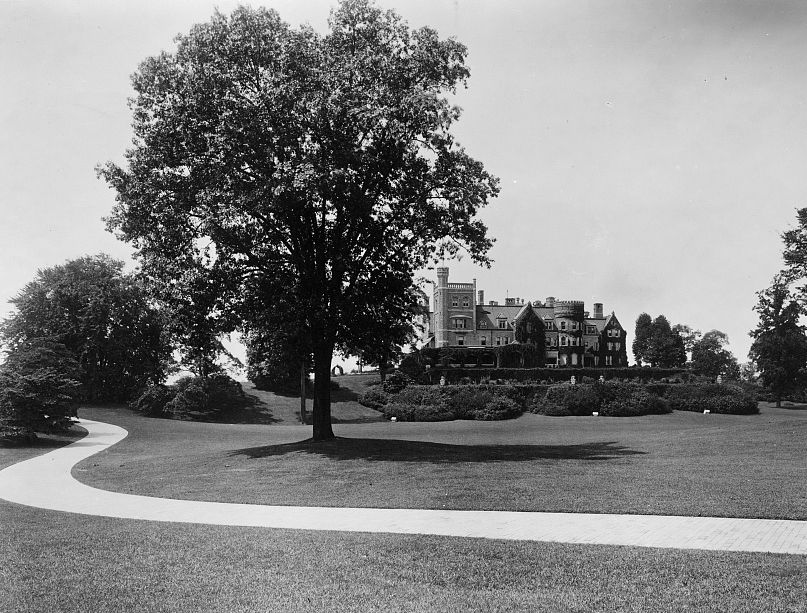
Rockwood Hall in 1916

Rockwood Hall, a section of the state park, was formerly the site of the home of William Rockefeller, brother of John D. Rockefeller. Laurance Rockefeller donated the land to New York in 1999 for use as a park. One of the early owners of the property was Alexander Slidell Mackenzie, who lived there from 1840 to 1848. Edwin Bartlett obtained the property and build Rockwood, an English Gothic castle of locally quarried stone. Bartlett sold the house to his business partner William Henry Aspinwall in 1860; Aspinwall made it his summer home and improved the property and house, and purchased enough land to make his estate 200 acres (81 ha). Upon his death in 1875, his son Lloyd Aspinwall lived there until 1886. William Rockefeller then purchased it for $150,000. Rockefeller expanded his property to about 1,000 acres (400 ha) and either renovated or rebuilt the castle. The resulting 204-room house measured 174 x 104 feet and was the second-largest private house in the U.S. at the time, only behind the Biltmore mansion in Asheville, North Carolina. After sitting vacant for a time, the mansion was torn down in the 1940s.

In 1971 Representative Otis Pike proposed a bill to expropriate historic Gardiners Island, owned by the Gardiner family since 1639, to turn it into a Federal National Monument. Robert David Lion Gardiner, one of the co-owners, complained that the proposal to expropriate his family's property was unfair, when the Rockefellers had been allowed to continue to own the Pocantico Hills.

The land has been used as part of the park since the 1970s, when Laurance Rockefeller leased the estate to New York for use as a park.

== In popular culture ==
- The park's entrance on New York State Route 117 and the highway itself were used briefly in the 2002 comedy, Super Troopers.

== See also ==
- List of New York state parks
