= William Rickarby Miller =

American painter

United States Naval Academy
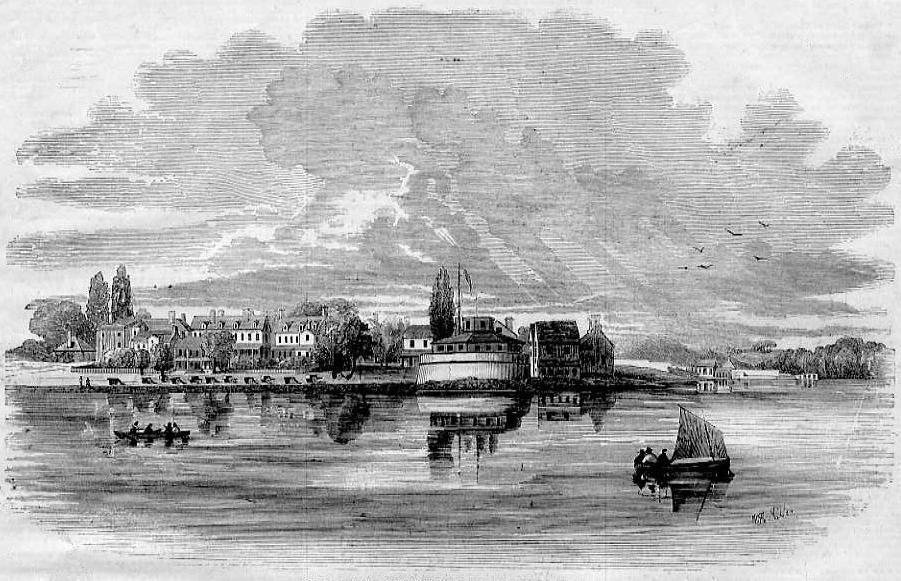

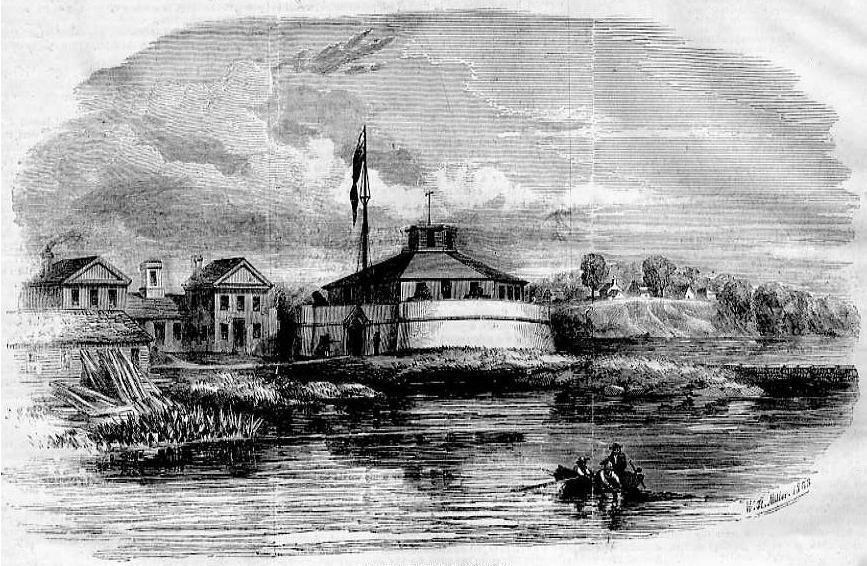
Two engravings of the United States Naval Academy by William Rickarby Miller

William Rickarby Miller (May 20, 1818 in Staindrop – July 1893 in New York City) was an American painter, of the Hudson River School.

== Life ==
His father was Joseph Miller, a landscape painter. He immigrated to New York City in 1844.

His work is in the Smithsonian American Art Museum, Metropolitan Museum of Art, and New York Historical Society.

Miller's original diary is currently held by the New-York Historical Society.

== Gallery ==
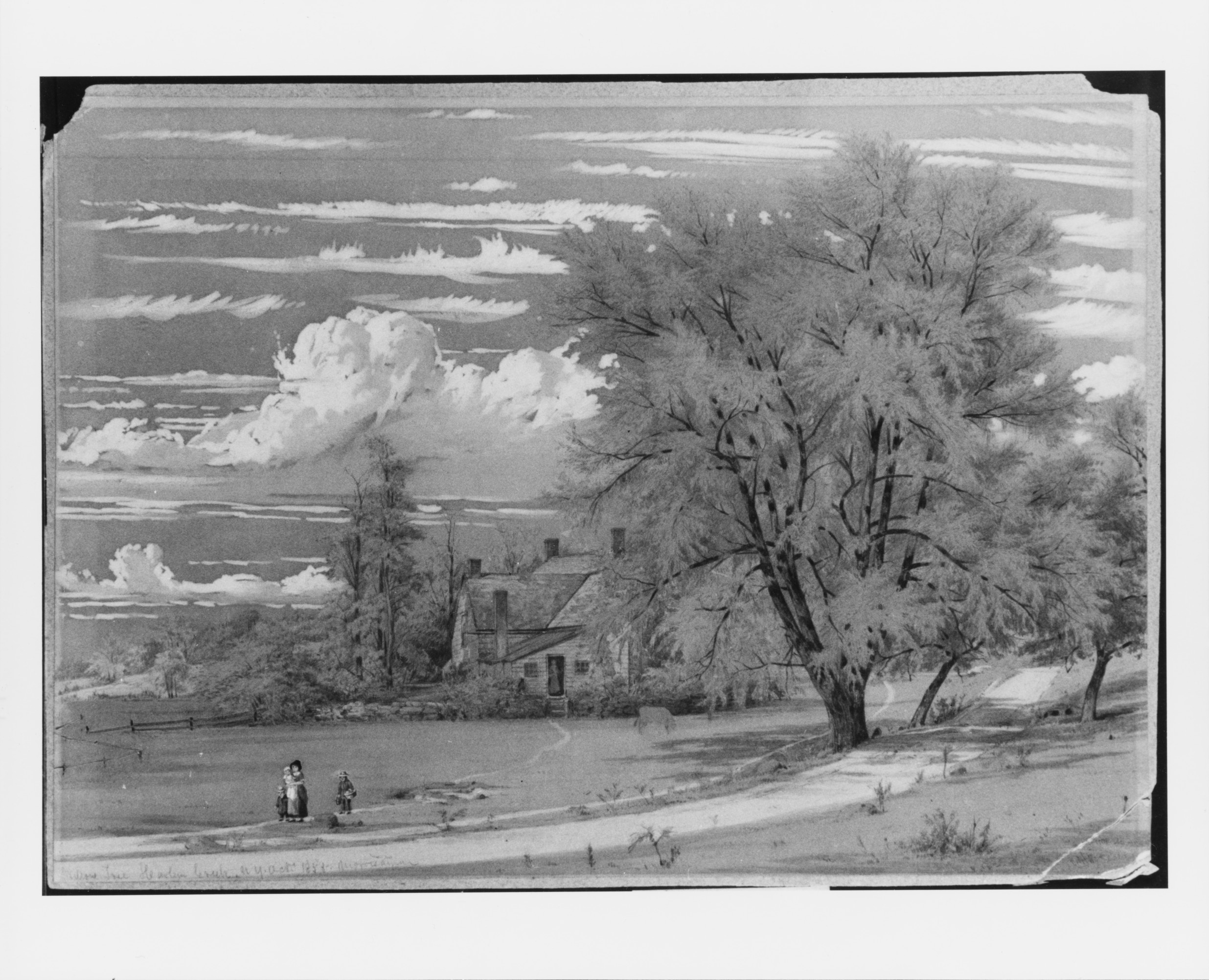
Willow Tree, Harlem Creek, New York, 1853, Metropolitan Museum of Art

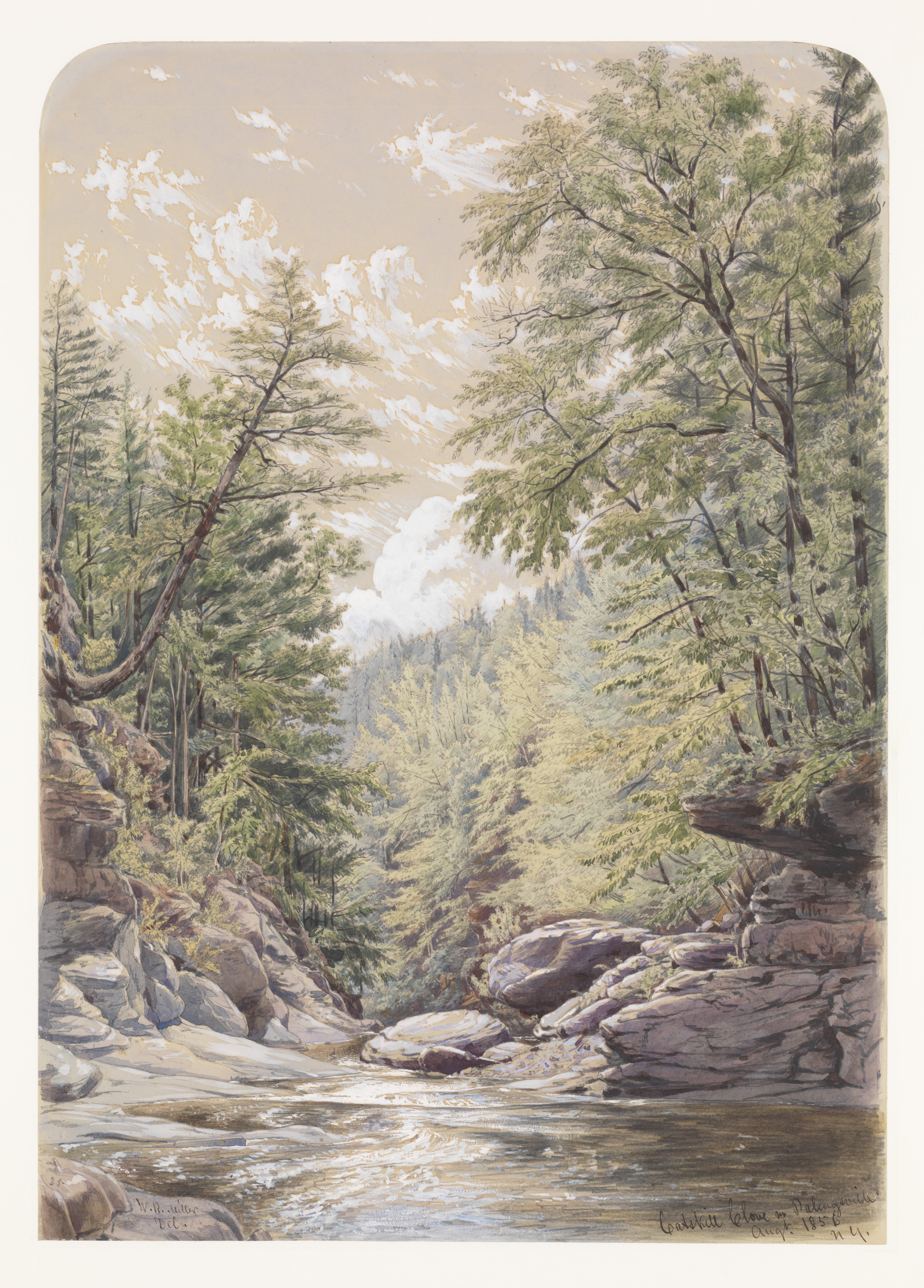
Catskill Clove in Palingsville, 1856, Metropolitan Museum of Art

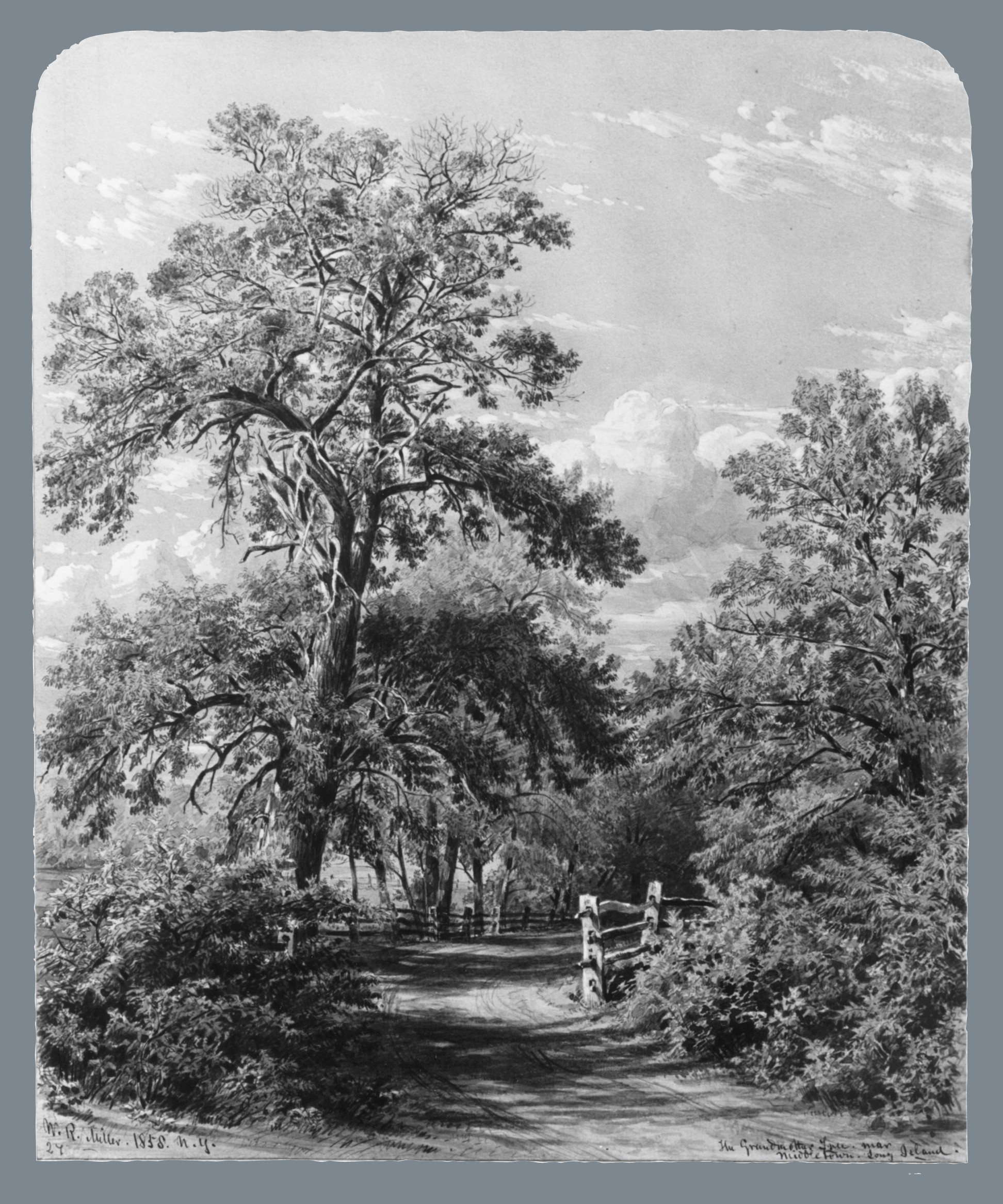
The Grandmother Tree, near Middletown, Long Island,1858, Metropolitan Museum of Art
