= Ariana Rockefeller =

American fashion designer and equestrian (born 1982)

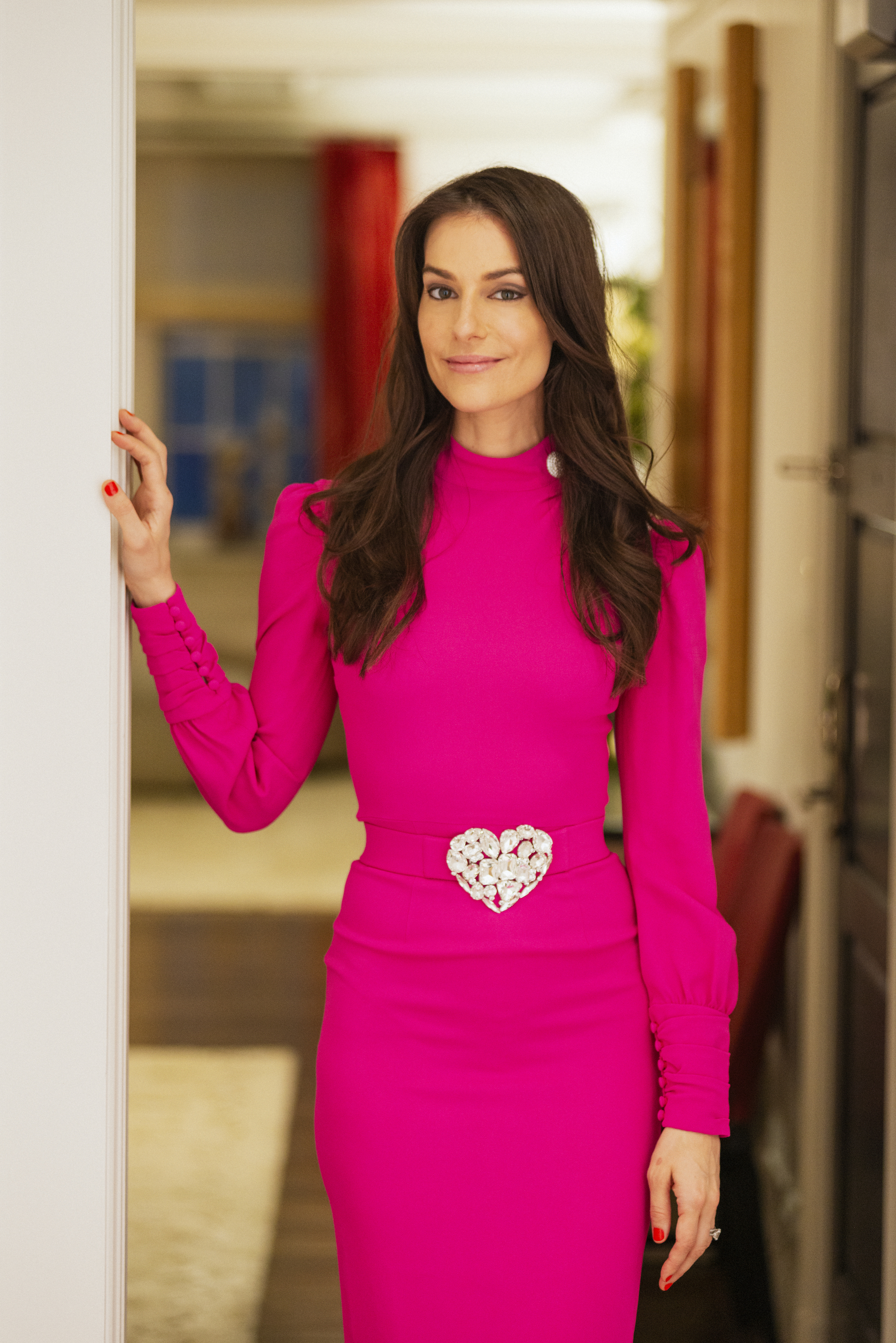
- Rockefeller in 2018
- Born: May 26, 1982 (age 44)
- Education: Columbia University (BA)
- Occupations: Fashion designer, equestrian
- Spouse: Matthew Bucklin (m. 2010; div. 2019)
- Parent(s): David Rockefeller Jr. Diana Newell Rockefeller
- Relatives: See Rockefeller family

Ariana Rockefeller (born May 26, 1982) is an American heiress, model, and amateur equestrian. A member of the Rockefeller family, she is granddaughter of banker David Rockefeller. Rockefeller founded her own fashion line in 2011. In January 2021, she reported that she had closed the business "a couple of years ago". As a competitive show jumper, she has competed in events, including the Hampton Classic. She has publicly opposed other members of her family, regarding fossil fuel divestment and defending ExxonMobil.

== Early life and education ==
Ariana Rockefeller was born to David Rockefeller Jr. and Diana Newell Rockefeller. Her hometown is Cambridge, Massachusetts, but she was raised in New York and Maine.

Her paternal grandfather, David Rockefeller, was a billionaire businessman and the former chairman of Chase Bank from 1969 to 1981 as well as chairman of the Council on Foreign Relations from 1970 to 1985.

She attended the Ethel Walker School, an all-girls boarding school in Connecticut. She competed on the equestrian team in high school, during which time she took an interest in show jumping. She graduated from Columbia University with a B.A. in Political Science in 2009. As a college student, she interned at the United Nations.

== Career ==
=== Fashion and lifestyle business ===
Rockefeller launched her own fashion line in 2011. In 2014, she opened a pop-up shop in the SoHo neighborhood of Manhattan. She added a line of handbags in 2016 after hiring handbag designer Bassam Ali. In January 2021, she reported that she closed her fashion business "a couple of years ago".

=== Equestrian career ===
Rockefeller began riding horses when she was three years old. She competed on the equestrian team in high school, during which time she took an interest in show jumping. She took a break from riding in college, and resumed by partaking in competitive show jumping in 2012. In 2015, Rockefeller placed fourth in the Hampton Classic.

=== Modeling ===
In May 2021, Rockefeller signed with Marilyn Agency in New York to work on special projects in their talent division.

== Philanthropy ==
Rockefeller has served on the board of the nonprofit David Rockefeller Fund. Rockefeller supports the Humane Society of the United States. She is a board member of God's Love We Deliver and a Junior Associate of the Museum of Modern Art. Rockefeller has chaired the New York Botanical Garden's Winter Ball for several years. She also continues her family tradition of involvement and interest in ancient Greek culture and archaeology.

== Views on family legacy and fossil fuel divestment ==
In a 2016 interview on CBS This Morning, she spoke out against the #Exxonknew campaign that was started by members of the Rockefeller family, among them her cousin David Kaiser, son of Neva Goodwin Rockefeller, and distant relative, Valerie Rockefeller Wayne, daughter of former Senator Jay Rockefeller, revealing a sharp divide within the family over its legacy in the petroleum industry and fossil fuel divestment. She also criticized the ongoing campaign to target ExxonMobil, a company that her family founded, as "deeply misguided" and "counterproductive" to ''Exxon's ongoing good work in clean and renewable energy'' in a New York Times piece.

== Personal life ==
On September 4, 2010, Rockefeller married entrepreneur Matthew Bucklin. Their divorce was filed in April and finalized in October 2019.
