= Walter J. Kaiser =

American academic (1931–2016)

- Born: Walter Jacob Kaiser; May 31, 1931
- Died: January 5, 2016 (aged 84)
- Occupation: academic
- Spouse: Neva Rockefeller
- Children: 2

Walter Jacob Kaiser (May 31, 1931 – January 5, 2016) was an American academic.

He was the Francis Lee Higginson Professor of English Literature and Professor of Comparative Literature Emeritus at Harvard University.

From 1988 to 2002, he was the director of Villa I Tatti.

In 1966, Kaiser married Neva Goodwin, a member of the Rockefeller family. They had two children, Miranda and David Kaiser.

He earned a BA and PhD from Harvard University.

== Books ==
- Praisers Of Folly (Harvard University Press, 1963)
