= Neva Goodwin =

American economist (born 1944)

- Born: Neva Goodwin Rockefeller; June 1, 1944 (age 81)
- Education: Harvard University (BA, MPA); Boston University (PhD)
- Employer: Tufts University
- Known for: Director of the Global Development And Environment Institute
- Spouses: Walter J. Kaiser (m. 1966; div. 1981) Bruce Mazlish (m. 1981; died 2016)
- Children: 2, including David Kaiser
- Parent(s): David Rockefeller; Margaret McGrath
- Relatives: See Rockefeller family

Neva Goodwin Rockefeller (born June 1, 1944) is an American businesswoman. She has served as co-director of the Global Development and Environment Institute (GDAE) at Tufts University since 1993, where she is a research associate at the Fletcher School of Law and Diplomacy and director of the Social Science Library: Frontier Thinking in Sustainable Development and Human Well-Being.

Goodwin works towards a contextual economics theory that will have more relevance to contemporary real-world social and ecological concerns than does the dominant economic paradigm. To this end, she is the lead author of two introductory university-level economics textbooks as well as online teaching modules, along with editing two six-part series, among other publications (see below).

Goodwin is also involved with efforts to motivate business to recognize social and ecological health as significant, long-term corporate goals. She is involved in socially responsible investing and served in leadership roles at organizations such as, most recently, the New Economy Coalition, Winrock International Institute for Agricultural Development, Ceres, and the Sustainable Endowments Institute.

== Scholarship ==
Goodwin is active in a variety of attempts to systematize and institutionalize an economic theory – "contextual economics" – that will have more relevance to contemporary real-world social and ecological concerns than does the dominant economic paradigm, along with university-level curriculum for these approaches and results, and action and policy to implement these understandings. Her work ranges across climate change, labor relations, and feminist economics (where she helped develop the notion of the core sphere of production). She also seeks a deeper theoretic understanding from exposure to on-the-ground experiments in alternative socio-economic institutional design.

She is the lead author of two introductory college-level textbooks: Microeconomics in Context and Macroeconomics in Context, published by M.E. Sharpe and then Routledge. She is also the editor of two six-part book series: Evolving Values for a Capitalist World (University of Michigan Press), and Frontier Thinking in Economic Thought (Island Press).

She is currently on the editorial board of Schmollers Jahrbuch, Journal of Contextual Economics.

Goodwin's work has been published in various peer-reviewed journals and periodicals, including Real-World Economics Review (previously post-autistic economics review), Our Planet: The Magazine of the United Nations Environment Programme, Forum for Social Economics, Growing the Economy through Global Warming Solutions (a series published by the Civil Society Institute), Opinion Sur, Online Encyclopedia of Ecological Economics (published by the International Society for Ecological Economics), the Encyclopedia of Life Support Systems, Review of Radical Political Economics, Voprosy Ekonomiki [Economic Questions], Ecological Economics, Green China Magazine, World Development (editing a special edition), and The Harvard Business Review. Her work has also appeared in several edited compilations. GDAE also hosts several of her working papers.

Her work has been reviewed in the Review of Radical Political Economics, Management Revue, Journal of Economic IssuesInternational Labour Review, The Journal of Consumer Affairs, The Journal of Environment & Development, Southern Economic Journal, and The Economic Journal.

She has lectured widely, including at the Club of Rome and The Smithsonian Institution Grand Challenges Consortia; MIT; Thirtieth Annual E. F. Schumacher Lectures; New School for Social Research; University of Utah; the Kennedy School of Government; the Yale School of Forestry and Environmental Studies; the Cambridge Forum; Environmental Grantmakers Association; the University of Moscow; the University of Cambridge; the EPA; the Russian Society for Ecological Economics; the American Economic Association; Socially Responsible Investing (SRI in the Rockies); the American Association of Legal Scholars; the U.S. Society for Ecological Economics (keynote address); the Eastern Economics Association; the Atlantic International Economic Society; the International Society for Quality of Life Studies (keynote address); the Boston Theological Institute in conjunction with The American Association for the Advancement of Science; the UN Development Program; the Society for the Advancement of Socio-Economics; and the World Institute for International Development, Helsinki.

Goodwin has helped arrange a variety of conferences, seminars, and symposia at Pocantico Conference Center, Tufts University, Harvard University, Boston University and elsewhere, and with the support of the Rockefeller Brothers Fund, Richard Lounsbery Foundation, Ford Foundation, MacArthur Foundation, Center for International Development at Harvard University (then, the Harvard Institute for International Development), Hewlett Foundation, and more.

Goodwin is also director of a project that has developed a "Social Science Library: Frontier Thinking in Sustainable Development and Human Well-Being." Containing a bibliography of more than 9,000 titles, including full text PDFs of about a third of these, this material will be sent on USB drives or CDs to all university libraries in 137 developing countries.

== Public activity ==
Goodwin is currently on the board of advisors at Sustainable Endowments Institute; and the president of the Mount Desert Land and Garden Preserve.

Goodwin has previously worked with the Institute for New Economic Thinking (INET); Ceres (Coalition for Environmentally Responsible Economy; on their board of directors); College of the Atlantic; Bar Harbor, Maine (as the vice-chair of the board); the Rockefeller Brothers Fund (as a trustee, and then vice-chair of the board); the Human Development and Capability Association (as a founding fellow); the International Society for Ecological Economics; Washington, D.C., President's Council on Sustainable Development; Task Force on Population & Consumption; U.S. Department of Commerce, Economic Development Administration; the Committee for the Political Economy of the Good Society (PEGS; as a founding board member); the World Bank; the International Center for Research on Women, Washington, D.C. (as a trustee, and committee chair); Technology + Economics consulting firm; the New Community Development Corporation, Department of Housing and Urban Development (HUD); and the Boston Society of Architects.

Goodwin was also active in organizing her family to attempt to reason with the present and former CEOs of ExxonMobil regarding climate change, directly and through shareholder resolutions. The family had some success in persuading the company to reduce its public stance of ridiculing the science of climate change.

== Early life and family ==
Goodwin attended the Chapin School in New York and graduated from Concord Academy, Class of 1962.

Goodwin received an A.B. in English literature; Magna Cum Laude, Phi Beta Kappa from Harvard College, Class of 1966. Her senior thesis, "The Deciphered Heart: A Study of Conrad Aiken's Poetry and Prose Fiction," was published in full in the 75th Anniversary Year edition of the Sewanee Review the following summer, under the pen name Jennifer Aldrich. While a student at Radcliffe, Goodwin wrote and produced a play, " A Slap in the Faith," at Harvard's Loeb Theatre.

After working closely with Buckminster Fuller for seven years to establish and organize the Design Science Institute (now the Buckminster Fuller Institute), and then for a couple of years as a consultant, she returned to academia to receive a MPA from Harvard Kennedy School ('82) and a Ph.D. in economics from Boston University ('87). Her dissertation, Back to the Fork: What We Have Derived from Marshallian Economics and what We Might Have Derived, became her first book in 1991: Social Economics: An Alternative Theory: Building Anew on Marshall's Principles . While a student at BU, she co-taught courses with S. M. Miller and Paul Streeten, and was a research associate and coordinator of the Global Issues Program at BU's World Development Institute, as well as the director of Program Development at The African Studies Center.

Goodwin was also visiting fellow at the World Institute for Development Economics Research (WIDER) of the United Nations University in Helsinki, and a research associate at the Instituto Interamericano De Cooperacion Para La Agricultura (IICA), Buenos, Aires, Argentina, before moving to Tufts University in 1991.

Goodwin is the widow of Bruce Mazlish, and is the mother of two and grandmother of three.

She is an avid photographer, especially of lichens.

Goodwin is a fourth-generation member of the Rockefeller family. She is the third child of David Rockefeller and Margaret McGrath, along with siblings David, Abby, Peggy, Richard, and Eileen. "Goodwin" is originally her middle name, after an ancestor on her mother's side (no relation to other Goodwin economists).

== Bibliography ==
NB: See also Goodwin's curriculum vitae at her GDAE home page.

- Principles of Economics in Context, co-author with Jonathan Harris, Julie A. Nelson, Brian Roach, & Mariano Torras; M.E. Sharpe, 2014
- Microeconomics In Context: Third Edition, co-author with Jonathan Harris, Julie A. Nelson, Brian Roach, & Mariano Torras; M.E. Sharpe, 2014.
  - Italian translation, 2009
  - Transitional Economies edition, Neva Goodwin, Thomas E. Weisskopf and Frank Ackerman
    - Vietnamese translation, Commercial University of Hanoi, 2002
    - Russian translation, Moscow State University for the Humanities, 2002
  - First Editions by Houghton Mifflin Co., Boston
  - Co-authors of First and Second Editions: Julie A. Nelson, Frank Ackerman and Thomas E. Weisskopf
- Macroeconomics in Context: Second Edition, co-authors: Jonathan Harris, Julie A. Nelson, Brian Roach, & Mariano Torras; M.E. Sharpe, 2014
  - Co-authors of First Edition: Julie A. Nelson, and Jonathan Harris, with contributions by Brian Roach and James Devine
- co-editor with Jonathan Harris, Twenty-first Century Macroeconomics: Responding to the Climate Challenge, Edward Elgar, 2009
  - Paperback Edition, 2010
- co-editor with Jonathan Harris, New Thinking in Macroeconomics: Social, Institutional and Environmental Perspectives, Edward Elgar, 2004
- 1996-2005/2015, Evolving Values for a Capitalist World, series editor; University of Michigan Press
  - Robert E. Lane, Are Humans Misfits in Market Democracies?: The Spinach Pie Papers, Takeaway Two (Volume "7") (Social Sciences division at U. Michigan Press closed prior to publication; as of April 2015, available online in pdf and docx)
  - After the End of History: The Curious Fate of American Materialism (Volume 6)
  - Helping People Help Themselves by David Ellerman (2005)
  - 2005, co-editor with Nikos Passas, It's Legal But It Ain't Right: Harmful Social Consequences of Legal Industries (Volume 4)
  - 2000, Jonathan Harris ed., Rethinking Sustainability: Power, Knowledge and Institutions (Volume 3)
  - 2000, Severyn T. Bruyn, The Civil Economy: A Vision of Civil Society in the 21st Century (Volume 2)
  - 1996, editor; As if the Future Mattered: Translating Social and Economic Theory into Human Behavior (Volume 1)
- 1995-2001Frontier Thinking in Economic Issues, series editor and co-editor of each volume; Island Press
  - 2001, A Survey of Sustainable Development: Social and Economic Dimensions
  - 2000, The Political Economy of Inequality
  - 1999, The Changing Nature of Work, foreword by Robert Reich; co-editors: Frank Ackerman, Laurie Dougherty, and Kevin Gallagher
  - 1997, Human Wellbeing and Economic Goals, foreword by Tibor Scitovsky; co-editors: Frank Ackerman, David Kiron, Jonathan M. Harris, and Kevin Gallagher
  - 1996, The Consumer Society
  - 1995, A Survey of Ecological Economics
- Social Economics: An Alternative Theory: Building Anew on Marshall's Principles (1991) Macmillan, London and St. Martin's Press, New York

== Selected articles ==
NB: Most of these are also gathered on Goodwin's ResearchGate profile.

- 2014, The Human Element in the New Economics: A 60-year Refresh for Economic Thinking and Teaching, Real-World Economics Review 68:(August) pdf
- 2011, If US Consumption Declines Will the Global Economy Collapse?, in Karin Ekström and Kay Glans, eds. Changing Consumer Roles, New York: Routledge pdf
- 2010, A New Economics for the 21st Century, World Futures Review June–July pdf
- 2010, Good Business, Our Planet: The Magazine of the United Nations Environment Programme, (February) pdf
- 2009, Reforming Economic Theory: Resilience, Equity, and Sustainability, in Twenty-first Century Macroeconomics: Responding to the Climate Challenge (self-edited volume; see above)
- 2009, Teaching Ecological and Feminist Economics in the Principles Course, Forum for Social Economics 38:2 pdf
- 2008, An Overview of Climate Change, real-world economics review, 46:(20 May) pdf
- 2008, From Outer Circle to Center Stage: The maturation of heterodox economics, (2008) in John Harvey and Rob Garnett eds., Future Directions in Heterodox Economics, University of Michigan Press pdf
- 2007, What is the Economy for?, Opinion Sur, Nov.-Dec.
  - Competition among Firms – Who Benefits? English pdf Spanish pdf
  - Internalizing externalities: making markets and societies work better English pdf Spanish pdf
- 2007, Changing Climate, Changing Economy: how to think about climate change, Opinion Sur, Jul.-Oct.
  - Changing Climate, Changing Economy English pdf Spanish pdf
  - What is the economy for? English pdf Spanish pdf
  - Toward a changed economy–looking backward and forward English pdf Spanish pdf
  - Climate change as the immanent perfect storm English pdf Spanish pdf
- 2007, Economic Vitality in a Transition to Sustainability, in the series, Growing the Economy through Global Warming Solutions, the Civil Society Institute pdf
- 2006, The High Cost of Low Prices, Orion Magazine, 25:1(Jan./Feb.)
- 2006, The Limitations of Markets: Background Essay, Market Failures, The Aspen Institute Center for Business Education's Corporate Governance and Accountability Project pdf
- 2005, The Social Impact of Multinational Corporations: An outline of the issues, with a focus on workers, in Bruce Mazlish and Alfred D. Chandler Jr. eds., Mapping the Multinational Corporations: The New Global Leviathans in Historical Perspective Cambridge University Press
- 2004, co-authored with Julie A Nelson, Frank Ackerman, Thomas Weisskopf, A Post-Autistic Introduction to Economic Behavior, post-autistic economics review 28:25 (October) html
- 2004, co-authored with Jonathan Harris, Reconciling Growth and the Environment, New Thinking in Macroeconomics (self-edited volume; see above), pdf
- 2003, Equity, Online Encyclopedia of Ecological Economics, International Society for Ecological Economics pdf
- 2001, Civil Economy and Civilized Economics: Essentials for Sustainable Development, Encyclopedia of Life Support Systems, Oxford, UK: EOLSS Publishers Co. Ltd. pdf
- 2001, You can't beat something with nothing: getting an alternative into the curriculum, Review of Radical Political Economics pdf
- 2001, Taming the corporation, in A Survey of Sustainable Development: Social and Economic Dimensions (self-edited volume; see above)
- 2000, Development Connections: The Hedgerow Model, in Jonathan Harris, ed., Rethinking Sustainability: Power, Knowledge and Institutions (self-edited volume; see above) pdf
- 2000, The Transition to a Transition, in Barbara Smith-Moran and Rodney Peterson, eds. Consumption, Population and Sustainability: Perspectives from Science and Religion, Island Press
- 2000, Inequality and Corporate Power" in The Political Economy of Inequality (self-edited volume; see above)
- 1999, Introduction, The Changing Nature of Work (self-edited volume; see above) pdf
  - 1999, The Household Economy and Caring Labor, ibid
  - 1999, Social and Psychological Meanings of Work and Unemployment, ibid
- 1997, Introduction, in Human Wellbeing and Economic Goals (self-edited volume; see above) html
  - 1997, Interdisciplinary Perspectives on Wellbeing, ibid
- 1996, Visions of an Alternative, in The Consumer Society (self-edited volume; see above)
- 1996, Economic Meanings of Trust and Responsibility, in As if the Future Mattered (self-edited volume; see above)
- 1995, Economic Theory: Address at Moscow State University, The Newsletters of PEGS 5:1(Winter)
- 1995, Ethical and Institutional Issues in Ecological Economics, in A Survey of Ecological Economics (self-edited volume; see above)
- 1996, co-authored with Oleg Ananyin, Frank Ackerman and Thomas Weisskopf, Economics in Context, in Voprosy Ekonomiki [Economic Questions] Moscow, [printed in Russian]
- 1994, Commentary: A Range of Predictions for the Future, Ecological Economics (May)
- 1993, Macro and Global Issues for Sustainable Development, in Üner Kırdar and Leonard Silk eds., A World Fit for People, UN Development Program publication, NYU Press
- 1993, What Do We Know About Sustainable Development?, Green China Magazine (Summer)
- 1993, The Rounding of the Earth: Ecology and Global History, in Bruce Mazlish and Ralph Buultgens eds., Conceptualizing Global History, Westview Press pdf
- 1991, editor, Global Commons: Site of Danger, Source of Hope, World Development Special Issue (Jan.)
  - Lessons for the World from U.S. Agriculture: Unbundling Technology", ibid pdf
- 1983, co-author with Bruce Mazlish, The Wealth of Adam Smith, The Harvard Business Review, 4:(Jul.-Aug.)

== Working papers and lectures ==
- 2014 (April), Prices and Work in The New Economy pdf
- 2012, Labor's Declining Share and Future Quality of Life
  - Perspectives on Limits to Growth: Challenges to Building a Sustainable Planet, symposium presented by the Club of Rome and The Smithsonian Institution Grand Challenges Consortia, to celebrate the 40th anniversary of the publication of The Limits to Growth video
  - pdf
- 2010, What Can We Hope for the World in 2075?, Thirtieth Annual E. F. Schumacher Lectures [neweconomy.net/publications/what-can-we-hope-world-2075 html]
  - video
  - 2008, An Overview of Climate Change: What does it mean for our way of life? What is the best future we can hope for? pdf
- 2003 (Sept), Five Kinds of Capital: Useful Concepts for Sustainable Development pdf
- 2003 (Feb), Macroeconomics for the Twenty-First Century pdf
- 2001 (Jun), co-authored with Jonathan M. Harris, Better Principles: New Approaches to Teaching Introductory Economics pdf
- 2000 (Jun), Some Defining Characteristics of Contextual Economics pdf
- 1997 (Feb), co-authored with Oleg I. Ananyin, Frank Ackerman and Thomas E. Weisskopf, Economics in Context: The Need for a New Textbook pdf
