= Core sphere =

Within the field of microeconomics, the "core sphere" of the economy consists of households, families, and community groups that organize the many important economic activities central to sustaining human life. Neva Goodwin of Tufts University outlines the functions of the core sphere to include:

- Child bearing and child raising
- Care of the sick, elderly, or otherwise needy
- The final stage of production of many goods and services
- The organization of savings and investment
- Allocation of consumption spending
- Decisions regarding investing in and maintaining human capital
- Decisions regarding the supply of labor services
- The organization and use of leisure time

These human resources make up the core sphere of the economy, and they play significant roles in our lives. It was noted by Goodwin that if a monetary value were placed on the work generated by the core sphere in the United States, it would add to approximately $3.9 trillion and would account for approximately 30% of the total product.

Long before the Industrial Revolution, the core sphere was the entire economy. Families and communities provided for themselves by hunting and gathering. Then with industrialization came a market of competitive men working for wages and along with it what historians call the cult of domesticity. The core sphere became regarded not as part of the market sphere of the economy but more as emotional and altruistic behavior. Therefore, activities in the core sphere were not considered economic because they do not directly influence the market economy. As time has progressed towards the present, organizations such as daycare centers, nursing homes, and household cleaning businesses began to exist as paid jobs.

But the cult of domesticity still lingers on in present day. The Bureau of Labor Statistics published data in 2010 showing that women on average spend .72 more hours than men doing household activities and .34 more hours taking care of household members. The data showed than men on average spend 1.15 more hours working than women and also .75 more hours on leisure activities.

The distinction of the core sphere as a noneconomic sector of the economy has its drawbacks. Care work is a term that stands for tasks done in the service of others, and it does not have any direct economic payoff. Nancy Folbre discusses “the care penalty” in her book The Invisible Heart. She explains that care work is risky because it is done for people who are not obligated to return the favor. It has opportunity costs because a person who performs care work is potentially sacrificing paid work. The monetary value of care work is often weighted by its replacement cost. The unpaid work that makes up the core sphere of the economy creates social wealth, and at the same time subsidizes patriarchy and private wealth
