= Rockefeller family =

American industrial, political and banking family

- Business family
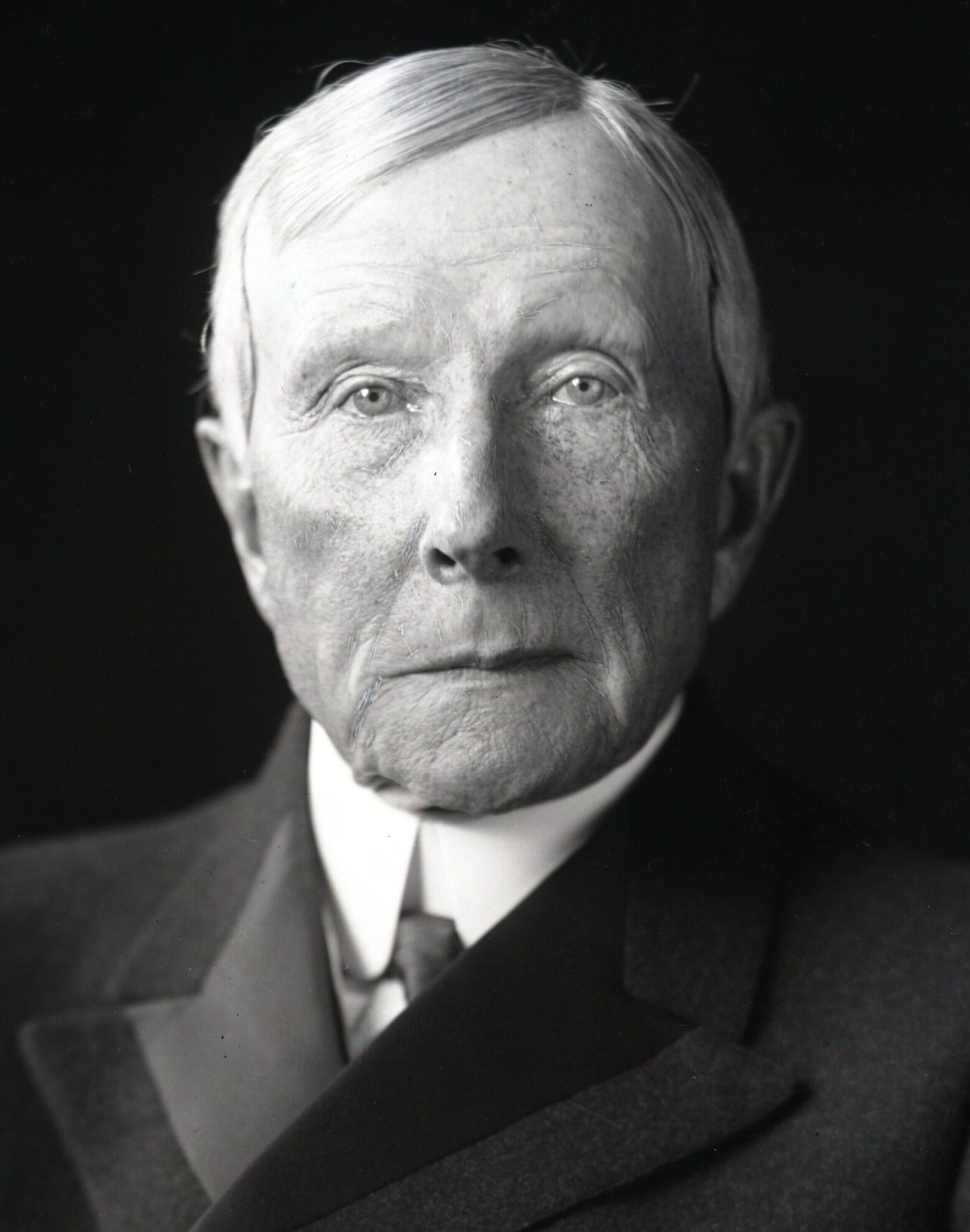
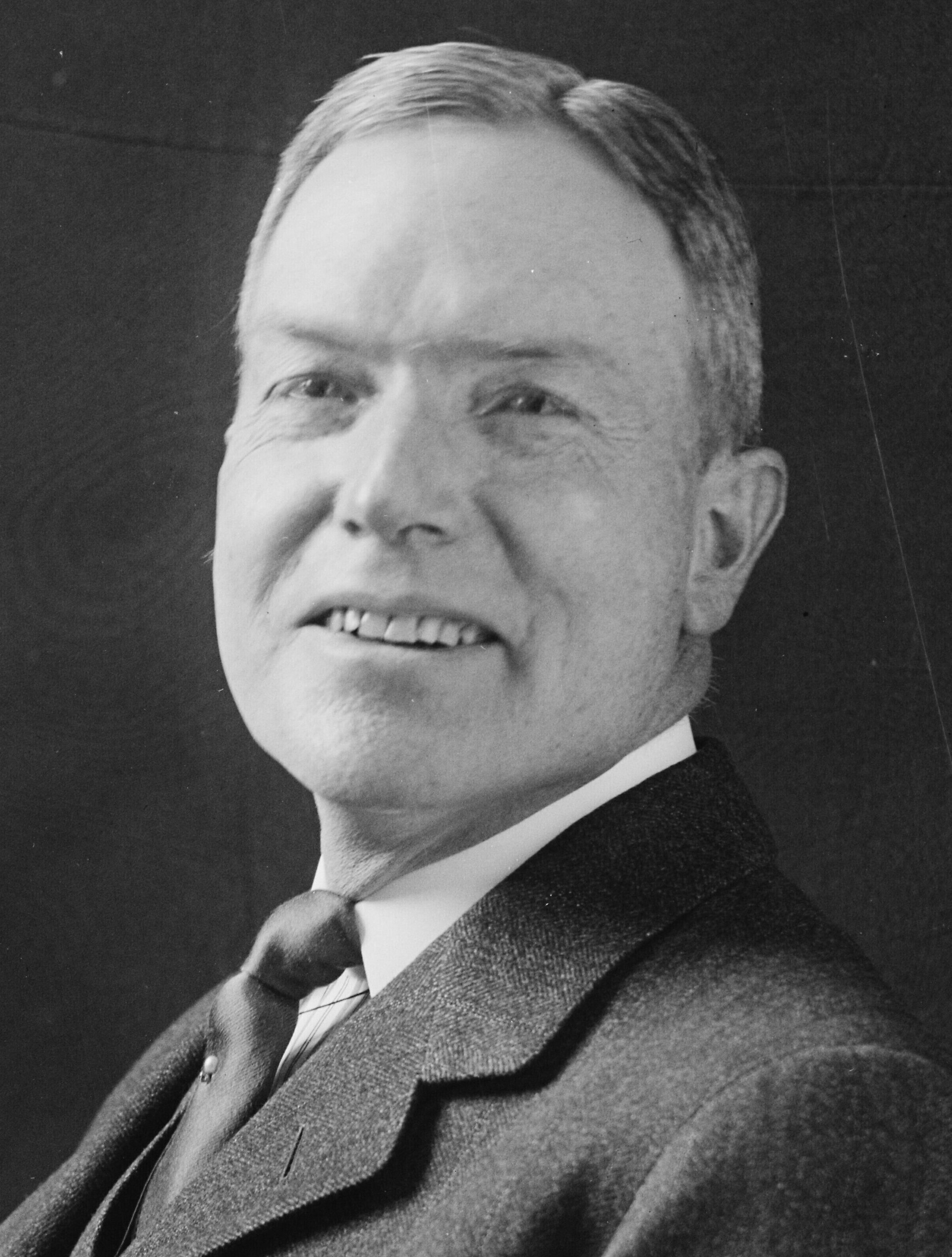
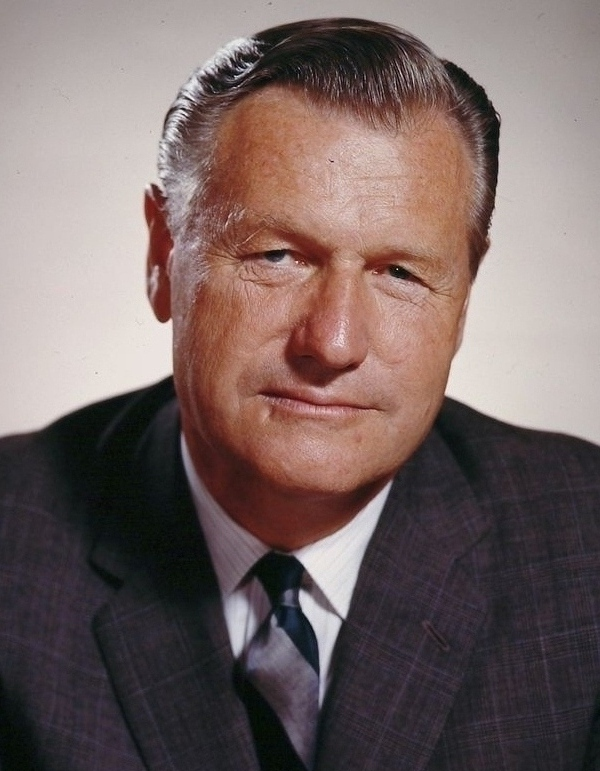
- John D. Rockefeller John D. Rockefeller Jr. Nelson Rockefeller
- Current region: New York, U.S.
- Origin: Rhineland, Germany
- Founded: 1723, Philadelphia; 303 years ago
- Founder: Johann Peter Rockefeller
- Current head: David Rockefeller Jr.
- Titles: List: Vice President of the United States; Governor (of New York, West Virginia, and Arkansas) Lieutenant Governor of Arkansas Secretary of State of West Virginia; United States Senator (West Virginia)
- Connected families: McCormick family
- Estates: Kykuit; The Casements; Rockwood Hall; Tryon Hall

The Rockefeller family (/ˈrɒkəfɛlər/ ROCK-ə-fell-ər) is an American industrial, political, and banking family that owns one of the world's largest fortunes. Their fortune was primarily earned in the American petroleum industry during the late 19th and early 20th centuries by brothers John D. Rockefeller and William A. Rockefeller Jr. who headed Standard Oil, the predecessor corporation of ExxonMobil, Saudi Aramco, and Chevron, among others The family had a long association with, and control of, Chase Manhattan Bank. By 1987, the Rockefellers were considered one of the most powerful families in American history.

The Rockefellers originated in the Rhineland in Germany and family members moved to the Americas in the early 18th century, while through Eliza Davison, with family roots in Middlesex County, New Jersey, John D. Rockefeller and William A. Rockefeller Jr. and their descendants are also of Scots-Irish ancestry.

== Background ==
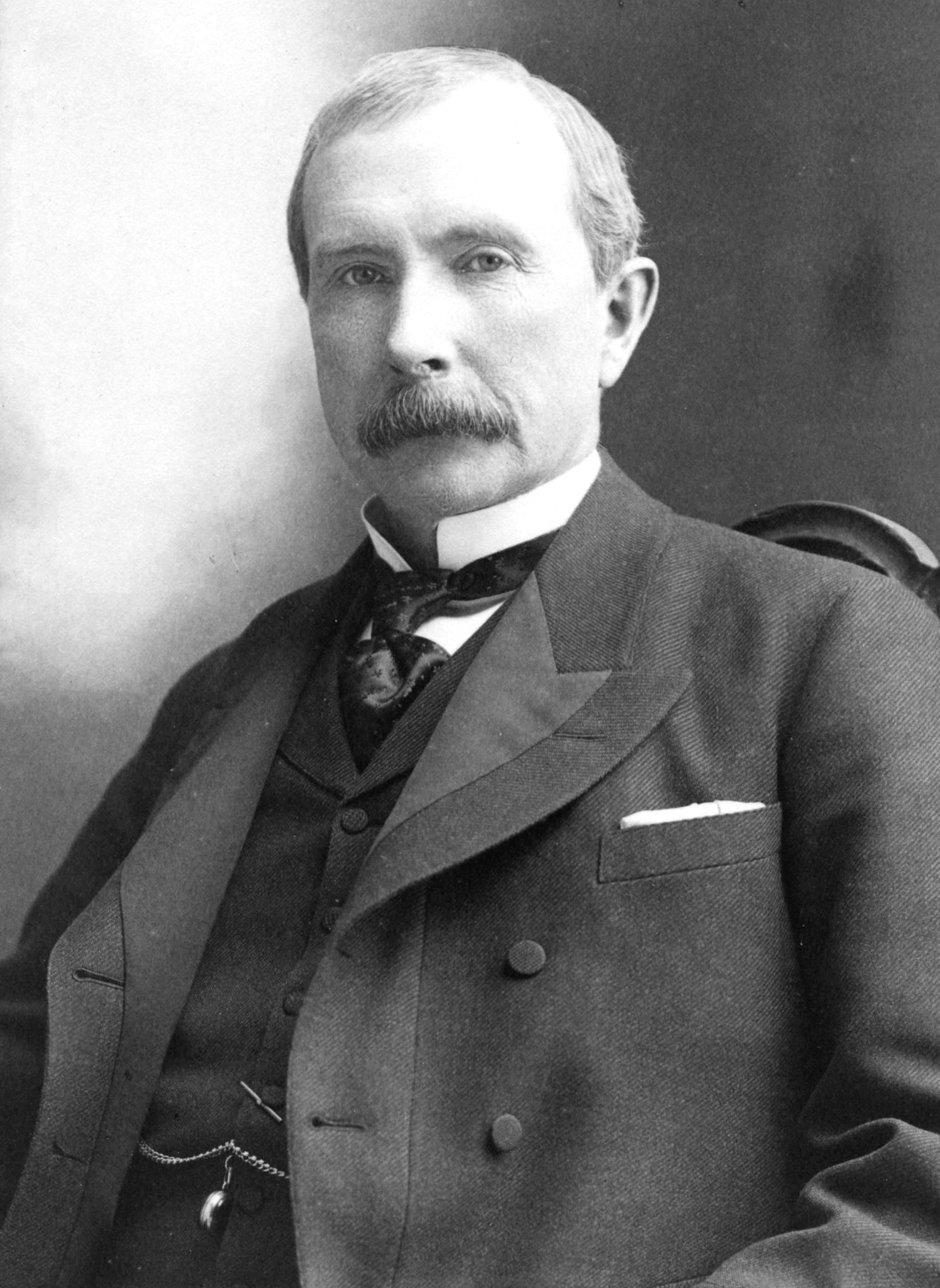
John D. Rockefeller Sr.

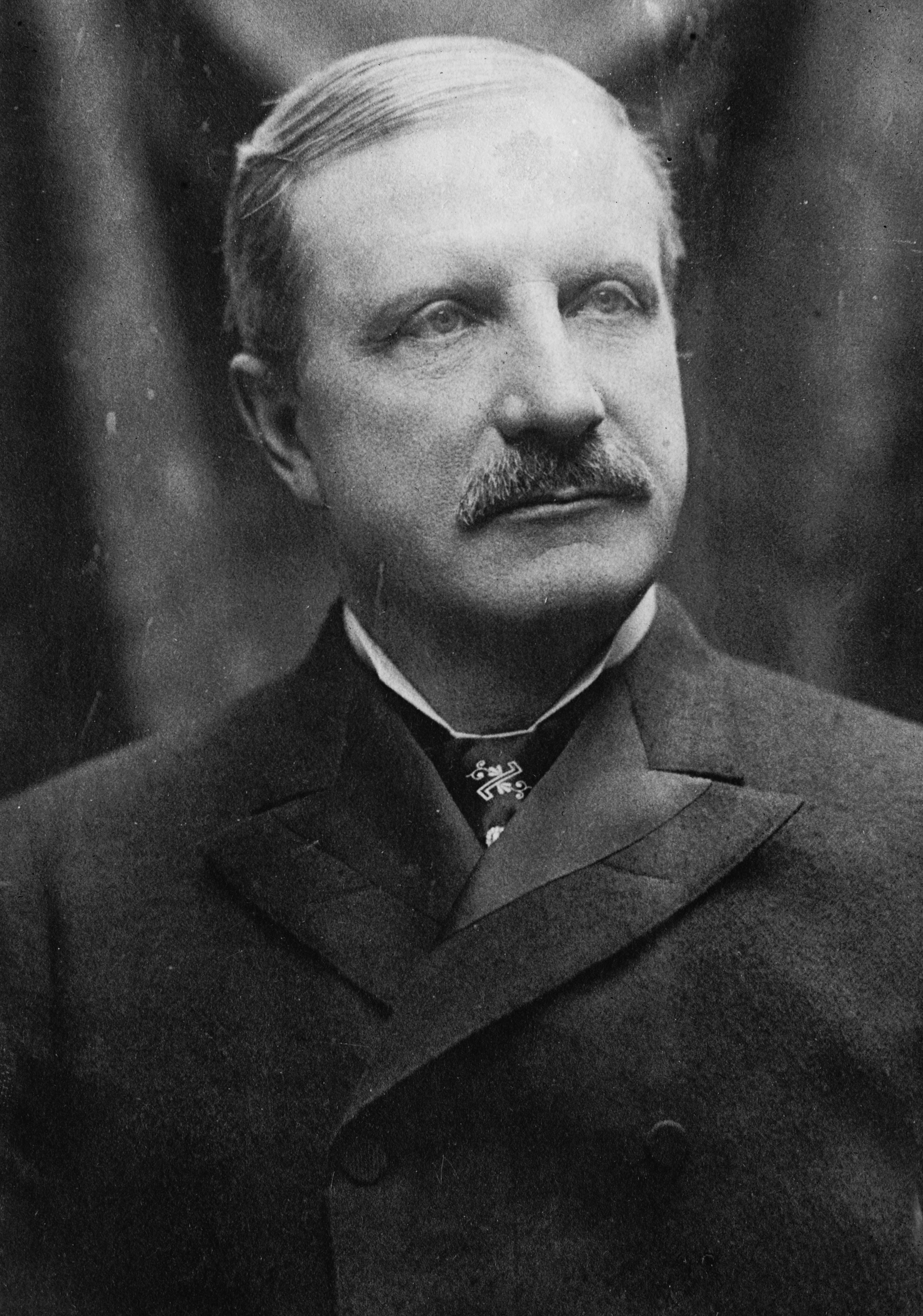
William A. Rockefeller Jr.

The Rockefeller family traces its origins to the now-abandoned German village Rockenfeld in c. 1600, with the earliest known ancestor, Goddard (or Gotthart) Rockenfeller, born in 1590 in the nearby village of Fahr. The American family branch is descended from Johann Peter Rockefeller (1681–1763), who migrated from the Rhineland to Philadelphia in the Province of Pennsylvania around 1723. In the US, he became a plantation owner and landholder in Somerville, and Amwell, New Jersey. One of the first members of the Rockefeller family in New York was businessman William A. Rockefeller Sr., who was born to a Protestant family in Granger, New York. He had six children with his first wife Eliza Davison, a daughter of a Scots-Irish farmer, the most prominent of whom were oil tycoons John D. Rockefeller and William A. Rockefeller Jr. who co-founded Standard Oil. John D. Rockefeller (known as "Senior", as opposed to his son John D. Rockefeller Jr., known as "Junior") was a devout Northern Baptist, and he supported many church-based institutions. While the Rockefeller family are mostly American Baptists, some of the Rockefellers were Episcopalians.

== Wealth ==
The combined wealth of the family—their total assets and investments plus the individual wealth of its members—has never been known with any precision. The records of the family archives relating to both the family and individual members' net worth are closed to researchers.

From the outset, the family's wealth has been under the complete control of the male members of the dynasty, through the family office. Despite strong wives who had influence over their husbands' decisions—such as the pivotal female figure Abby Aldrich Rockefeller, wife of John D. Rockefeller Jr.—in all cases they received allowances only and were never given even partial responsibility for the family fortune.

Much of the wealth has been locked up in the family trust of 1934 (which holds the bulk of the fortune and matures on the death of the fourth generation) and the trust of 1952, both administered by Chase Bank, the corporate successor to Chase Manhattan Bank. These trusts have consisted of shares in the successor companies to Standard Oil and other diversified investments, as well as the family's considerable real estate holdings. They are administered by a trust committee that oversees the fortune.

Management of this fortune today also rests with professional money managers who oversee the principal holding company, Rockefeller Financial Services, which controls all the family's investments. The present chairman of the Rockefeller Center is David Rockefeller Jr.

In 1992, it had five main arms:

- Rockefeller & Co. (money management: universities have invested some of their endowments in this company);
- Venrock Associates (venture capital: an early investment in Apple Computer was one of many it made in Silicon Valley entrepreneurial start-ups);
- Rockefeller Trust Company (manages hundreds of family trusts);
- Rockefeller Insurance Company (manages liability insurance for family members);
- Acadia Risk Management (insurance broker: contracts out policies for the family's vast art collections, real estate and private planes).

== Real estate and institutions ==
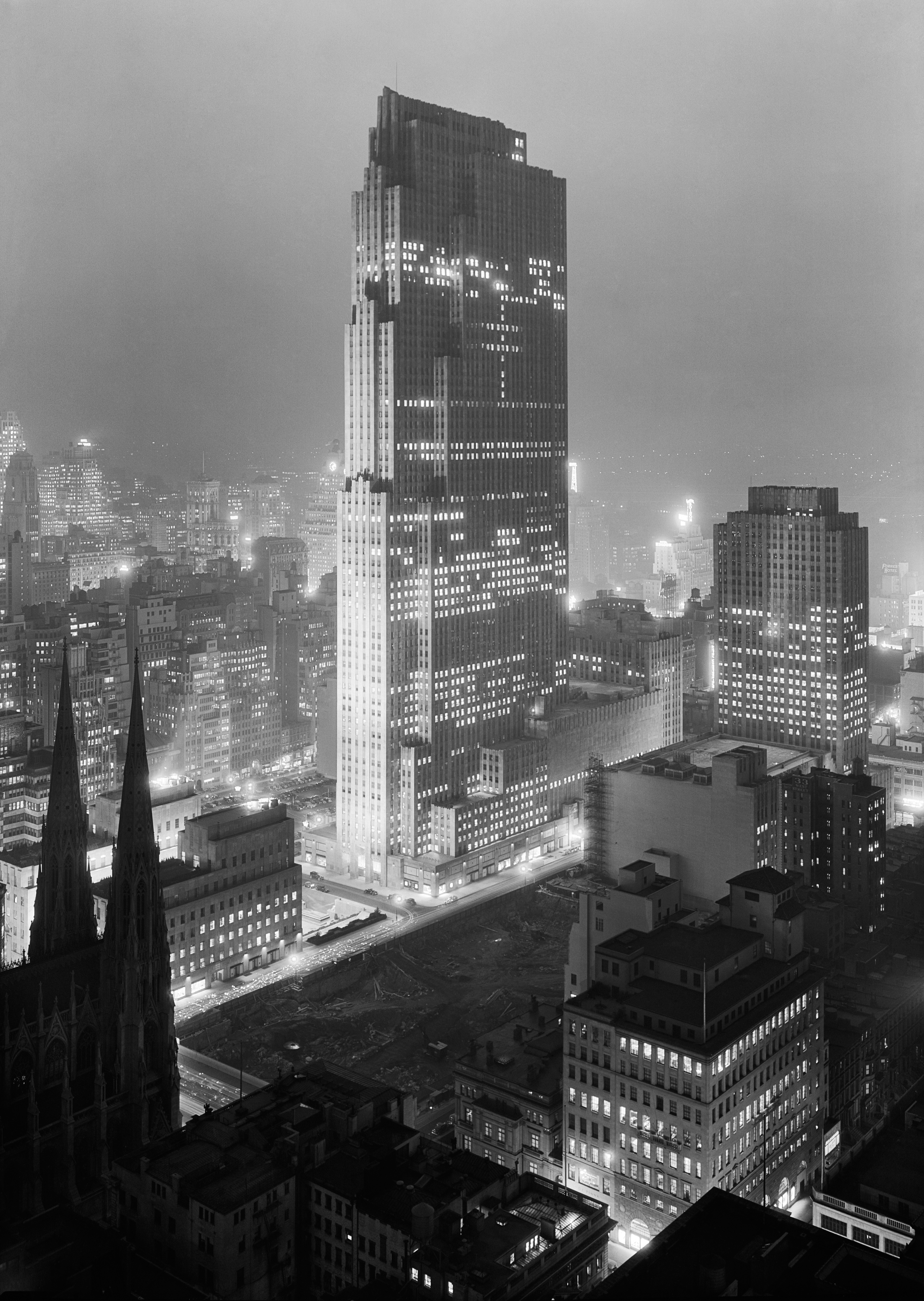
Rockefeller Center at night, December 1934

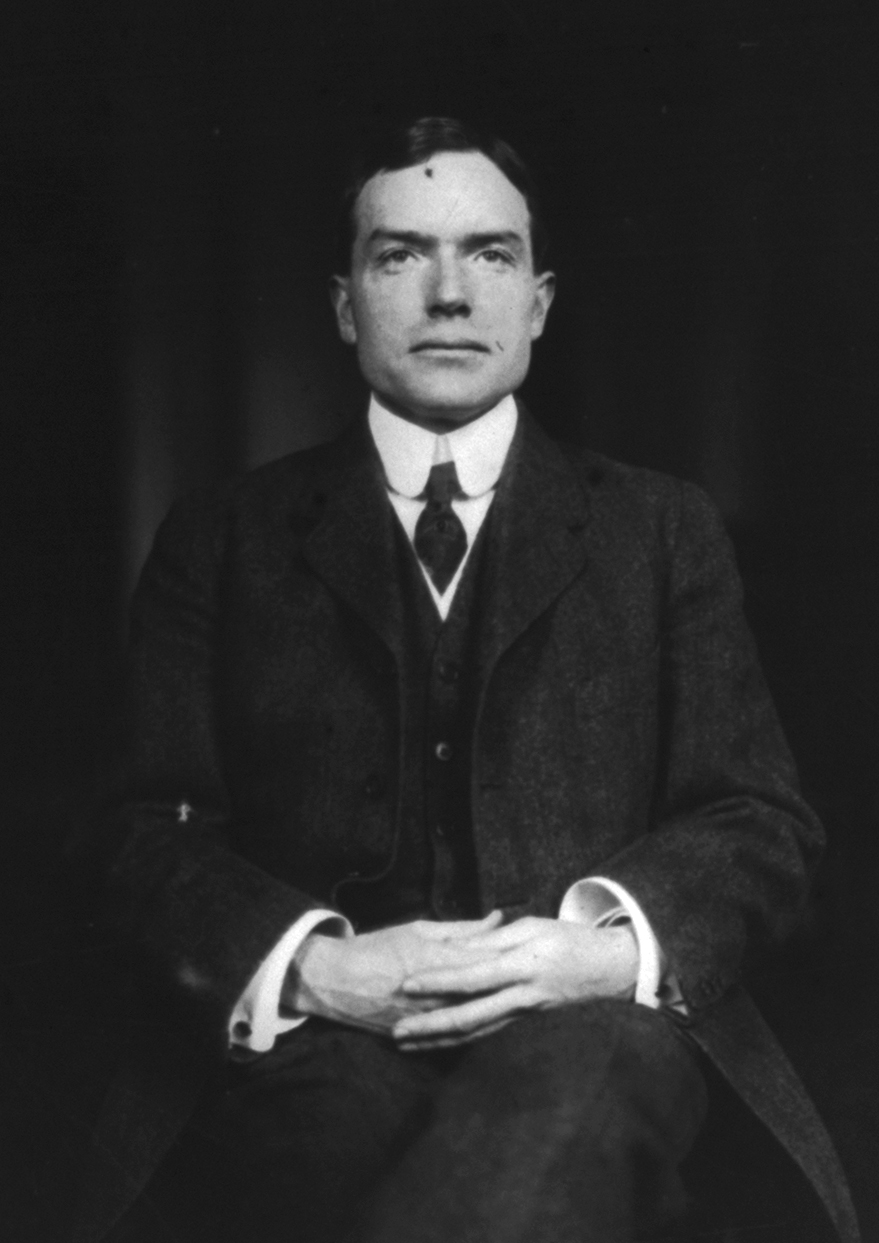
John D. Rockefeller Jr., the first president of the Rockefeller Foundation

The family was heavily involved in numerous real estate construction projects in the U.S. during the 20th century. Chief among them:

- Rockefeller Center, a multi-building complex built at the start of the Depression in Midtown Manhattan. The construction of Rockefeller Center was financed solely by the family
- International House of New York, New York City, 1924 (John Jr.) {involvement: John III, Abby Aldrich, David & Peggy, David Jr., Abby O'Neill}
- Wren Building, College of William and Mary, Virginia, from 1927 (renovation funded by Junior)
- Colonial Williamsburg, Virginia, from 1927 onwards (Junior), Abby Aldrich, John III and Winthrop, historical restoration
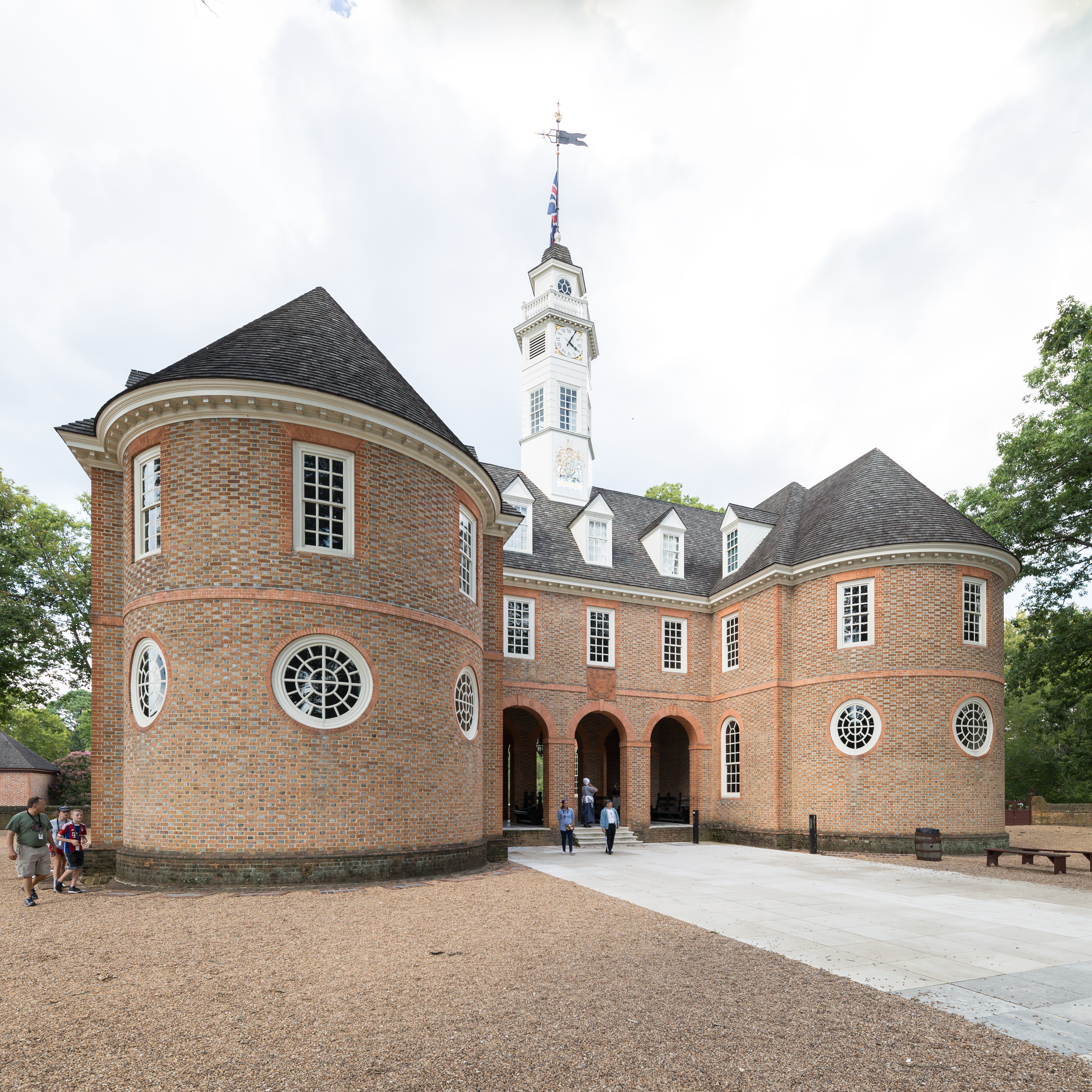
  Colonial Williamsburg
- Museum of Modern Art, New York City, from 1929 (Abby Aldrich, John Jr., Blanchette, Nelson, David, David Jr., Sharon Percy Rockefeller)
- Riverside Church, New York City, 1930 (John Jr.)
- The Cloisters, New York City, from 1934 (John Jr.)
- Rockefeller Apartments, New York City, 1936 (John Jr., Nelson)
- The Interchurch Center, New York City, 1948 (John Jr.)
- Asia Society (Asia House), New York City, 1956 (John III)
- One Chase Manhattan Plaza, New York City, 1961 (David)
- Nelson A. Rockefeller Empire State Plaza, Albany, New York, 1962 (Nelson)
- Lincoln Center, New York City, 1962 (John III)
- World Trade Center Twin Towers, New York City, 1973–2001 (David and Nelson)
- Embarcadero Center, San Francisco, 1974 (David)
- Council of the Americas/Americas Society, New York City, 1985 (David)
- Major housing developments:
  - Forest Hill Estates, Cleveland, Ohio
  - City Housing Corporation's efforts, Sunnyside Gardens, Queens, New York City
  - Thomas Garden Apartments, The Bronx, New York City
  - Paul Laurence Dunbar Housing, Harlem, New York City
  - Lavoisier Apartments, Manhattan, New York City
  - Van Tassel Apartments, Sleepy Hollow, New York (formerly North Tarrytown)
  - A development in Radburn, New Jersey
  - A further project involved David Rockefeller in a major middle-income housing development when he was elected in 1947 as chairman of Morningside Heights, Inc., in Manhattan by fourteen major institutions that were based in the area, including Columbia University. The result, in 1951, was the six-building apartment complex known as Morningside Gardens.
- Senior's donations led to the formation of the University of Chicago in 1890 and the Central Philippine University in the Philippines (the first Baptist university and second American university in Asia). This was one instance of a long family and Rockefeller Foundation tradition of financially supporting Ivy League and other major colleges and universities over the generations—seventy-five in total. These include:
  - Brown University
  - Case Western Reserve University
  - Columbia University
  - Cornell University
  - Dartmouth College
  - Harvard University
  - Massachusetts Institute of Technology
  - Princeton University
  - Spelman College
  - Stanford University
  - Tufts University
  - University of California, Berkeley
  - University of Pennsylvania
  - Yale University
  - Institutions overseas such as the London School of Economics and University College London, among many others.
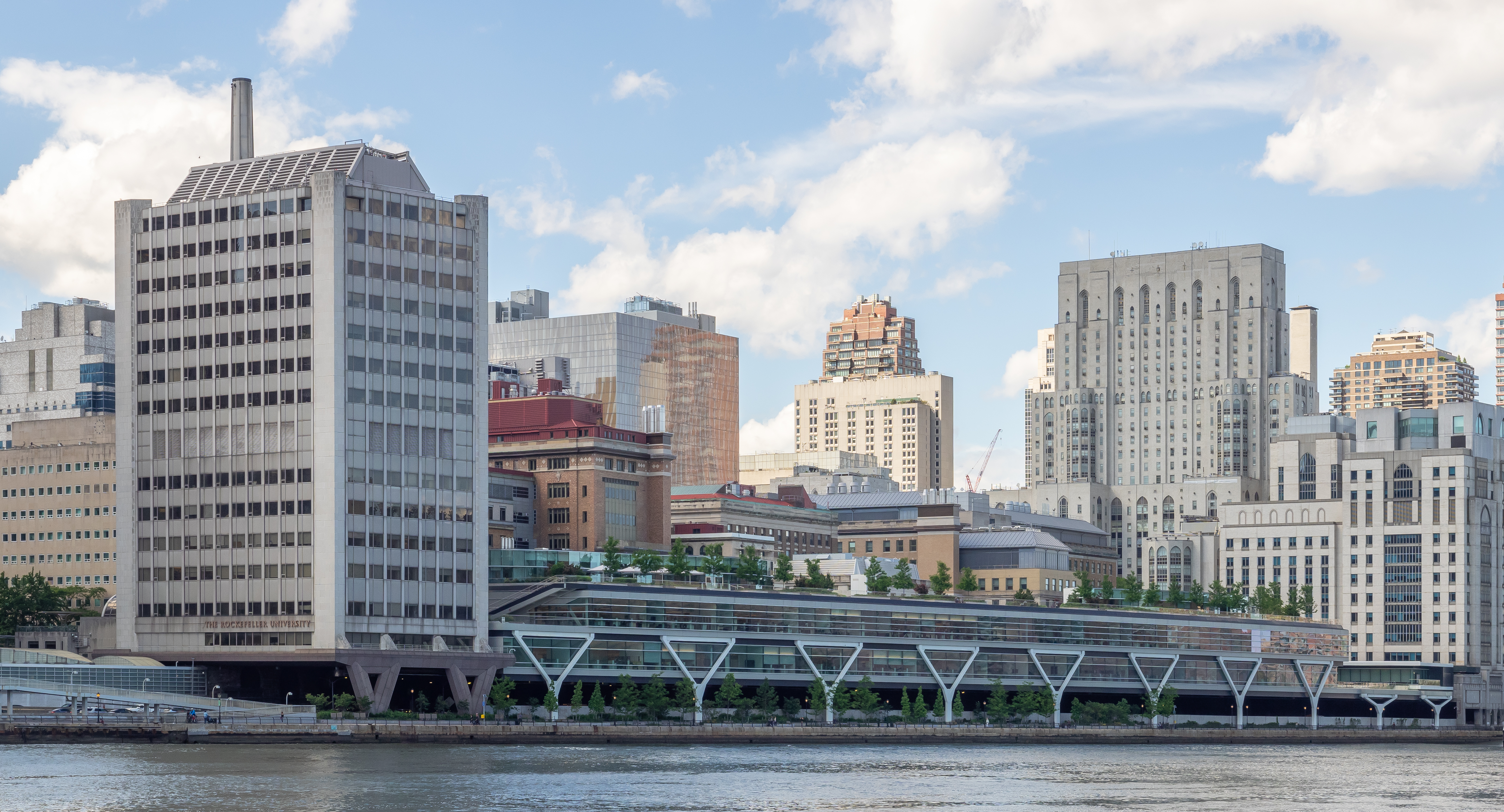
- Rockefeller University
  Senior (and Junior) also created
  - Rockefeller University in 1901
  - General Education Board in 1902, which later (1923) evolved into the International Education Board
  - Rockefeller Sanitary Commission in 1910
  - Bureau of Social Hygiene in 1913 (Junior)
  - International Health Division in 1913
  - China Medical Board in 1915.
  - Rockefeller Museum, British Mandate of Palestine, 1925–30
  - In the 1920s, the International Education Board granted important fellowships to pathbreakers in modern mathematics, such as Stefan Banach, Bartel Leendert van der Waerden, and André Weil, which was a formative part of the gradual shift of world mathematics to the US over this period.
  - To help promote cooperation between physics and mathematics Rockefeller funds also supported the erection of the new Mathematical Institute at the University of Göttingen between 1926 and 1929
  - The rise of probability and mathematical statistics owes much to the creation of the Institut Henri Poincaré in Paris, partly by the Rockefellers' finances, also around this time.
  - John D. Jr. established International House at Berkeley.
  - Junior was responsible for the creation and endowment of the Colonial Williamsburg Foundation, which operates the restored historical town at Williamsburg, Virginia, one of the most extensive historic restorations ever undertaken.

== Residences ==
Over the generations, the family members have resided in some historic homes. A total of 81 Rockefeller residences are on the National Register of Historic Places. Not including all homes owned by the five brothers, some of the more prominent of these residences are:

- One Beekman Place - The residence of Laurance in New York City.
- 10 West 54th Street - A nine-story single-family home, the former residence of Junior before he shifted to 740 Park Avenue, and the largest residence in New York City at the time, it was the home for the five young brothers; it was later given by Junior to the Museum of Modern Art.
- 13 West 54th Street - A four-story townhouse used by Junior and Abby between 1901 and 1913.
- 740 Park Avenue - Junior and Abby's famed 40-room triplex apartment in the luxury New York City apartment building, which was later sold for a record price.
- Bassett Hall - The house at Colonial Williamsburg bought by Junior in 1927 and renovated by 1936, it was the favourite residence of both Junior and Abby and is now a house museum at the family-restored Colonial Revival town.
- The Casements - A three-story house at Ormond Beach in Florida, where Senior spent his last winters, from 1919 until his death.
- The Eyrie - A sprawling 100-room summer holiday home on Mount Desert Island in Maine, demolished by family members in 1962.
- Forest Hill - The family's country estate and a summer home in Cleveland, Ohio, for four decades; built and occupied by Senior, it burned down in 1917.
- Golf House at Lakewood, New Jersey - The former three-story clubhouse for the elite Ocean County Hunt and Country Club, which Senior bought in 1902 to play golf on its golf course.
- Kykuit, also known as the John D. Rockefeller Estate - The landmark six-story, 40-room home on the vast Westchester County family estate, home to four generations of the family.
- The JY Ranch - The landmark ranch in Jackson Hole, Wyoming, the holiday resort home built by Junior and later owned by Laurance, which was used by all members of the family and had many prominent visitors, including presidents until Laurance donated it to the federal government in 2001.
- The Rocks - 1940 Shepard Street NW and 2121 Park Road NW, Washington, DC - The 12,000 square foot house sits on 15.9 acres bordering Rock Creek Park; and is the largest residential property in the District of Columbia. Built by Daisy Blodgett for her daughter Mona in 1927, the name refers to its location, not the current owner. The property was purchased by Jay Rockefeller in 1984 when he became US Senator for West Virginia. Jay lived in this home until his death in 2026. His wife, Sharon Percy Rockefeller continues to live there.
- Rockwood Hall - The former home of William Rockefeller Jr. (demolished in the 1940s).
- Rockefeller Guest House - The guest house of Blanchette Ferry Rockefeller.
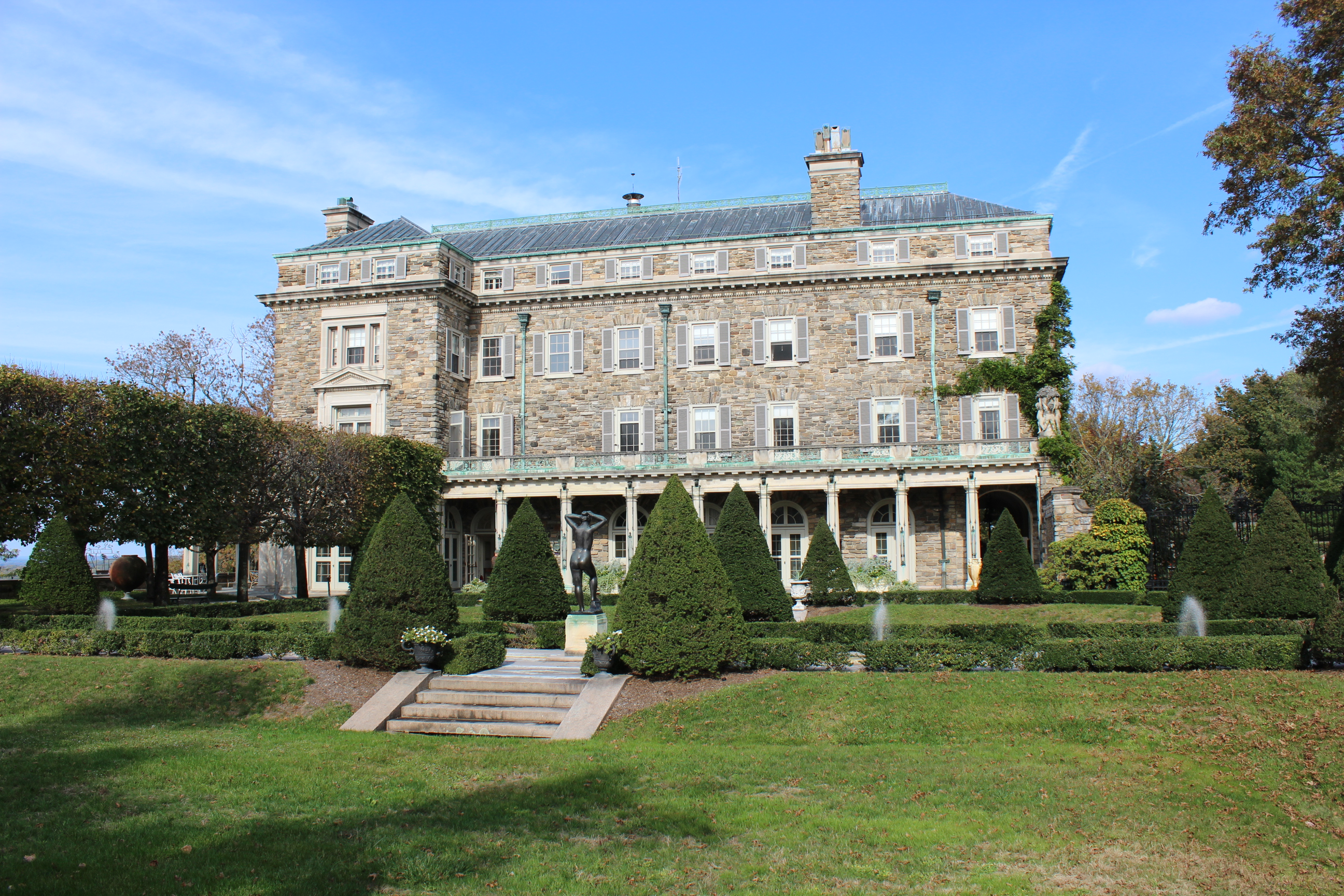
Kykuit, the landmark family home in Sleepy Hollow, New York

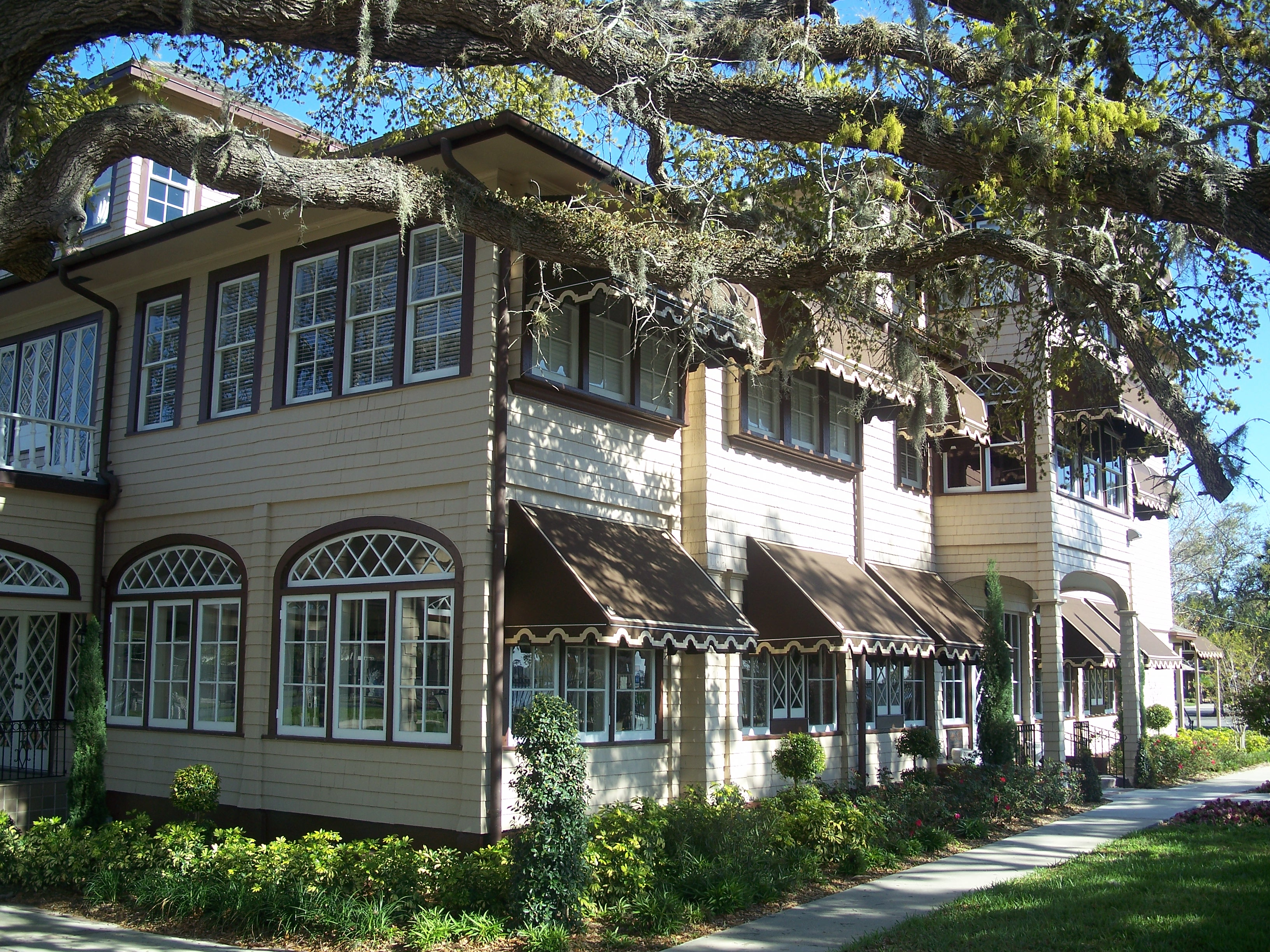
The Casements, the family's former winter residence in Florida

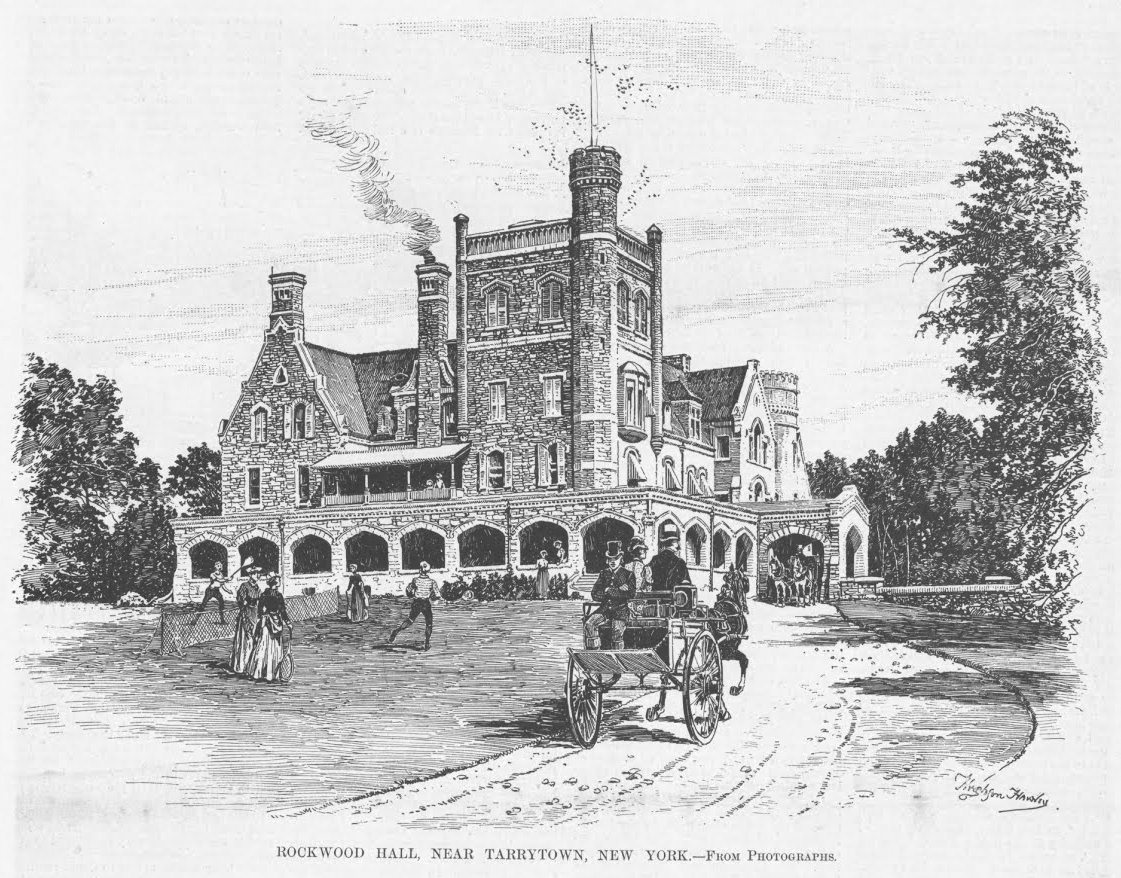
Rockwood Hall, Mount Pleasant, New York

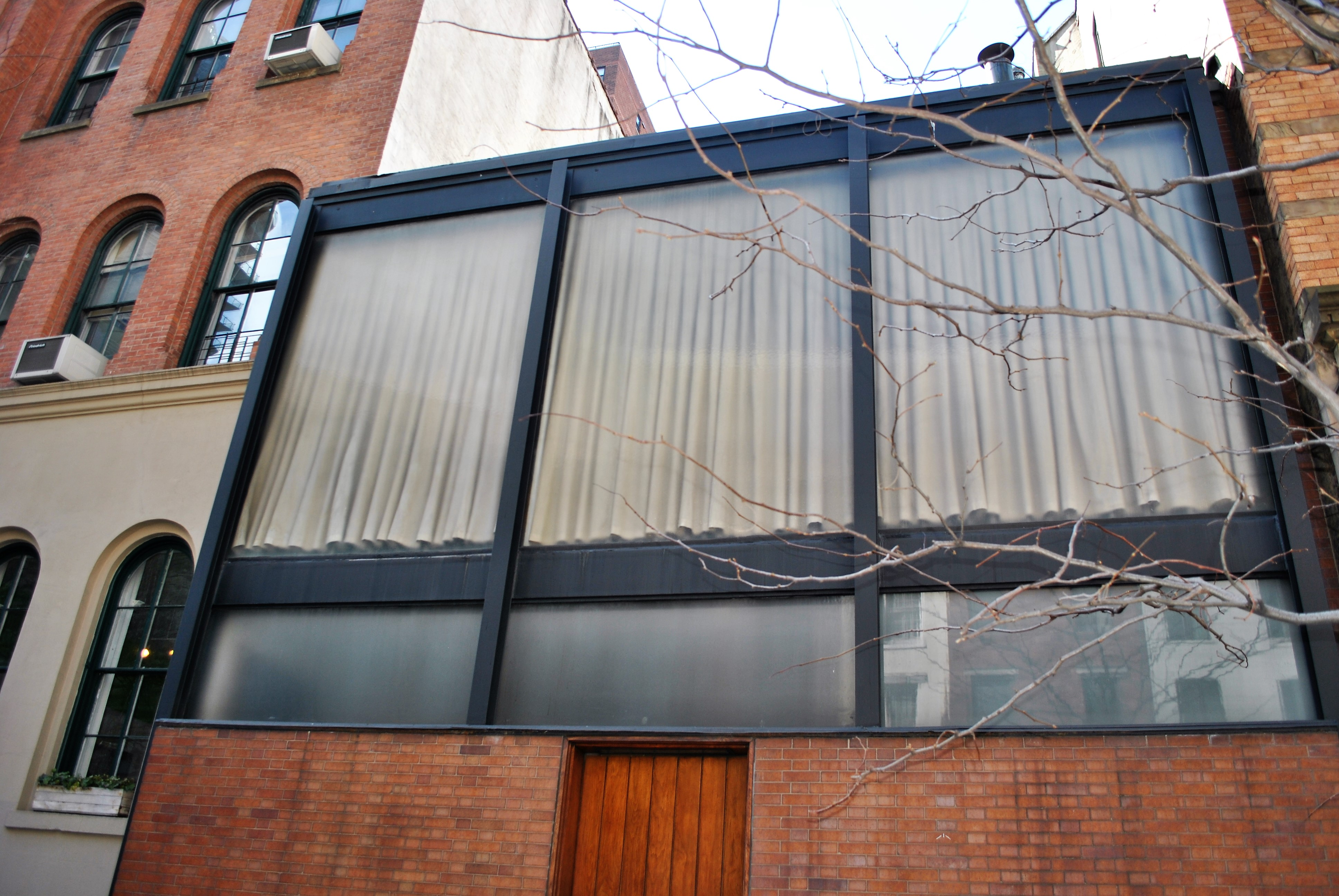
Rockefeller Guest House, New York City

== Politics ==
Prominent banker David Rockefeller Sr. was the family patriarch until his death in 2017. In 1960, when his brother Nelson Rockefeller was governor of New York, David Sr. successfully pressed for a repeal of a New York state law that restricted Chase Manhattan Bank from operating outside the city. David Sr. was twice offered the post of Treasury secretary by President Richard M. Nixon, but declined on both occasions. In 1979, he used his high-level contacts to bring Mohammad Reza Shah of Iran, who had been overthrown in the Iranian Revolution and was in poor health, for medical treatment in the United States. In 1998, he was awarded the Presidential Medal of Freedom by President Bill Clinton for his work on International Executive Service Corps.

=== Political offices held ===
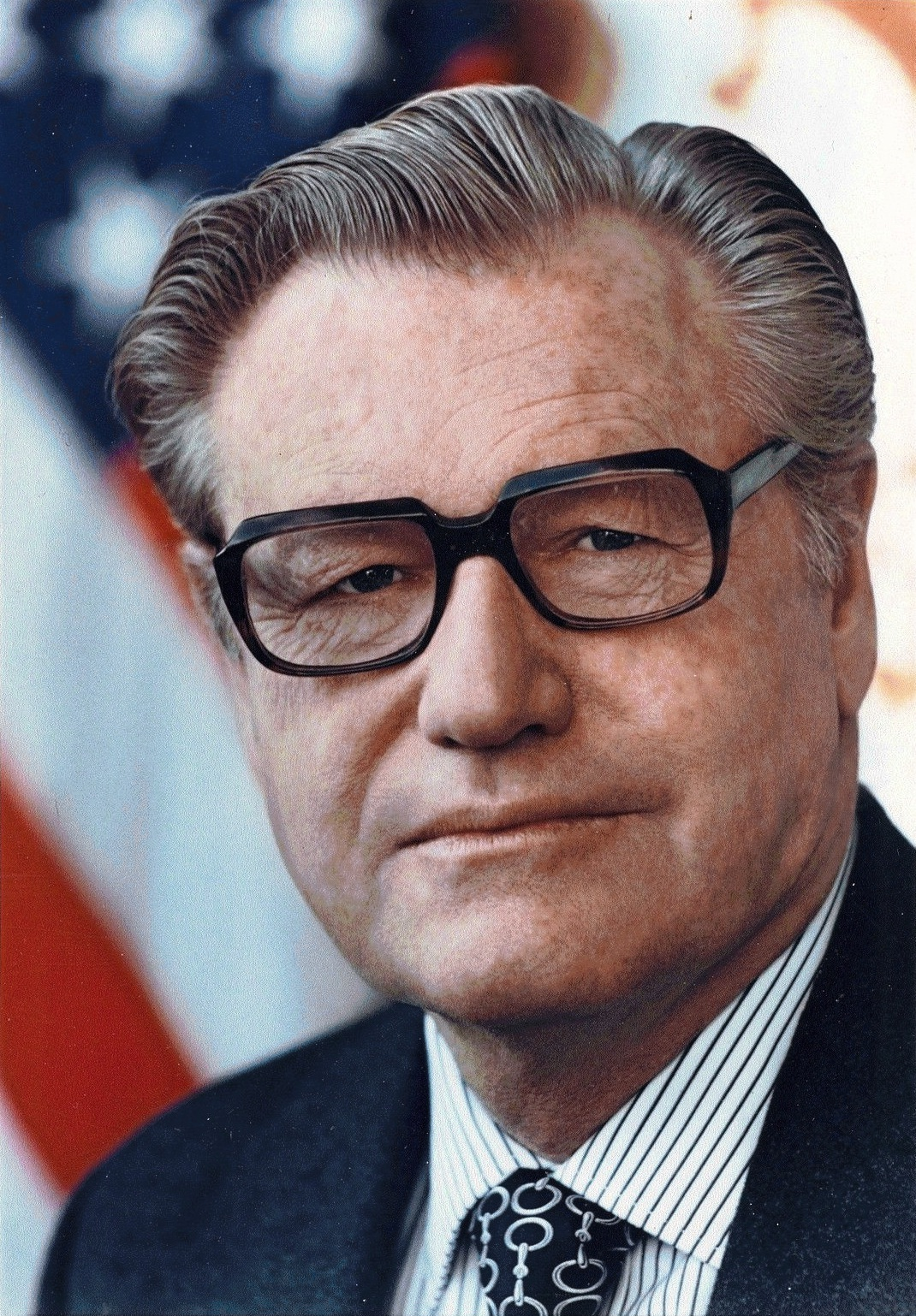
Nelson Rockefeller

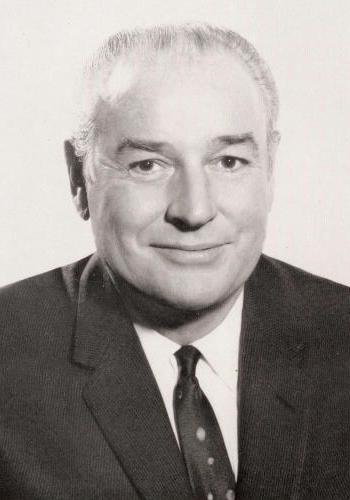
Winthrop Rockefeller

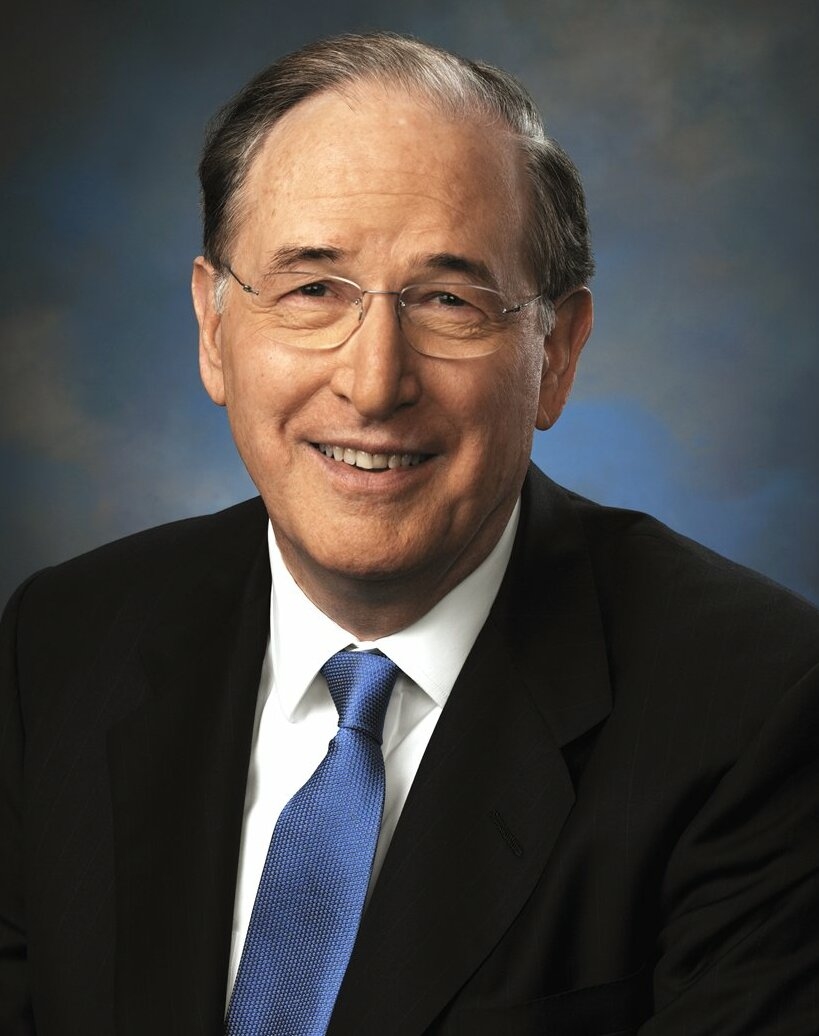
John D. "Jay" Rockefeller IV

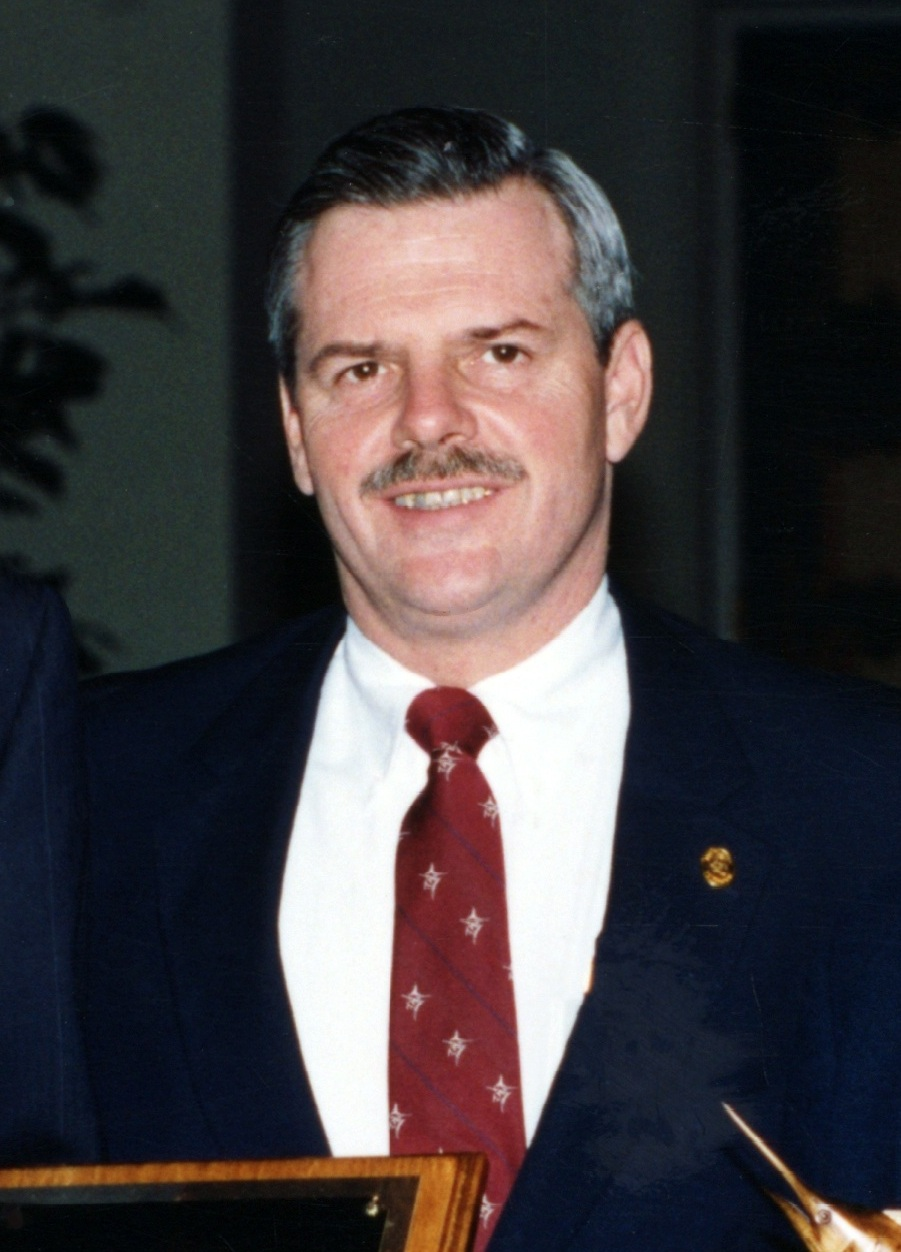
Winthrop Paul Rockefeller

- Nelson Rockefeller (1908–1979)
  - 1st Assistant Secretary of State for American Republic Affairs, 1944–1945
  - 1st Under Secretary Health, Education and Welfare, 1953–1954
  - 49th Governor of New York, 1959–1973
  - 41st Vice President of the United States, 1974–1977
- Winthrop Rockefeller (1912–1973)
  - 37th Governor of Arkansas, 1967–1971
- John Davison "Jay" Rockefeller IV (1937–2026)
  - Member of West Virginia House of Delegates, 1966–1968
  - 22nd Secretary of State of West Virginia, 1969–1973
  - 29th Governor of West Virginia, 1977–1985
  - U.S. Senator from West Virginia, 1985–2015
- Winthrop Paul Rockefeller (1948–2006)
  - 17th Lieutenant Governor of Arkansas, 1996–2006

== Legacy ==
A trademark of the dynasty over its 140-plus years has been the remarkable unity it has maintained, despite major divisions that developed in the late 1970s, and unlike other wealthy families such as the Du Ponts and the Mellons. A primary reason has been the lifelong efforts of "Junior" to not only cleanse the name from the disgrace stemming from the ruthless practices of Standard Oil but his tireless efforts to forge family unity even as he allowed his five sons to operate independently. This was partly achieved by regular brothers and family meetings, but it was also because of the high value placed on family unity by first Nelson and John III, and later especially with David.

Regarding achievements, in 1972, on the 100th anniversary of the founding of Andrew Carnegie's philanthropy, the Carnegie Corporation, which has had a long association with the family and its institutions, released a public statement on the influence of the family on not just philanthropy but encompassing a much wider field. Summing up a predominant view among the international philanthropic world, albeit one poorly grasped by the public, one sentence of this statement read: "The contributions of the Rockefeller family are staggering in their extraordinary range and in the scope of their contribution to humankind."

John D. Rockefeller gave away US$540 million over his lifetime (in dollar terms of that time), and became the greatest lay benefactor of medicine in history. His son, Junior, also gave away over $537 million over his lifetime, bringing the total philanthropy of just two generations of the family to over $1 billion from 1860 to 1960. Added to this, The New York Times declared in a report in November 2006 that David Rockefeller's total charitable benefactions amount to about $900 million over his lifetime.

The combined personal and social connections of the various family members are vast, both in the United States and throughout the world, including the most powerful politicians, royalty, public figures, and chief businessmen. Figures through Standard Oil alone have included Henry Flagler and Henry H. Rogers. Powerful people associated with David Rockefeller included Henry Kissinger, Richard Parsons (chairman and CEO of Time Warner), C. Fred Bergsten, Peter G. Peterson (Senior Chairman of the Blackstone Group), and Paul Volcker.

In 1991, the family was presented with the Honor Award from the National Building Museum for four generations worth of preserving and creating some of the U.S.'s most important buildings and places. David accepted the award on the family's behalf. The ceremony coincided with an exhibition on the family's contributions to the built environment, including John Sr.'s preservation efforts for the Hudson River Palisades, the restoration of Williamsburg, Virginia, construction of Rockefeller Center, and Governor Nelson's efforts to construct low- and middle-income housing in New York state.

The Rockefeller name is imprinted in numerous places throughout the United States, including within New York City, but also in Cleveland, where the family originates:

- Rockefeller Center - A landmark 19-building 22-acre (89,000 m^{2}) complex in Midtown Manhattan established by Junior: Older section constructed from 1930 to 1939; Newer section constructed during the 1960s-1970s;
- Rockefeller Apartments - An apartment building in Midtown Manhattan
- Rockefeller University - Renamed in 1965, this is the distinguished Nobel prize-winning graduate/postgraduate medical school (formerly the Rockefeller Institute for Medical Research, established by Senior in 1901);
- Rockefeller Foundation - Founded in 1913, this is the famous philanthropic organization set up by Senior and Junior;
- Rockefeller Brothers Fund - Founded in 1940 by the third-generation's five sons and one daughter of Junior;
- Rockefeller Family Fund - Founded in 1967 by members of the family's fourth-generation;
- Rockefeller Group - A private family-run real estate development company based in New York that originally owned, constructed and managed Rockefeller Center, it is now wholly owned by Mitsubishi Estate Co. Ltd;
- Rockefeller Philanthropy Advisors - is a 501(c)(3) nonprofit organization that advises donors in their philanthropic endeavours throughout the world;
- Rockefeller Research Laboratories Building - A major research centre into cancer that was established in 1986 and named after Laurance, this is located at the Memorial Sloan-Kettering Cancer Center;
- Rockefeller Center - Home of the International Student Services office and department of philosophy, politics and law at the State University of New York at Binghamton;
- Rockefeller Chapel - Completed in 1928, this is the tallest building on the campus of the University of Chicago, established by Senior in 1889;
- Rockefeller Hall - Established by Senior in 1906, this building houses the Case Western Reserve University Physics Department;
- Rockefeller Hall - Established by Senior and completed in 1906, this building houses the Cornell University Physics Department;
- Rockefeller Hall - Established by Senior in 1887, who granted Vassar College a $100,000 ($2.34 million in 2006 dollars) allowance to build additional, much needed lecture space. The final cost of the facility was $99,998.75. It now houses multi-purpose classrooms and departmental offices for political science, philosophy and math;
- Rockefeller Hall - Established by Senior and completed in 1886, this is the oldest building on the campus of Spelman College;
- Rockefeller College - Named after John D. Rockefeller III, this is a residential college at Princeton University;
- Michael C. Rockefeller Arts Center - Completed in 1969 in memory of Nelson Rockefeller's son, this is a cultural centre at the State University of New York at Fredonia;
- The Michael C. Rockefeller Collection and the Department of Primitive Art - Completed in 1982 after being initiated by Nelson, this is a wing of the Metropolitan Museum of Art;
- David and Peggy Rockefeller Building - A tribute to David's wife, Peggy Rockefeller, this is a new (completed in 2004) six-story building housing the main collection and temporary exhibition galleries of the family's Museum of Modern Art;
- Abby Aldrich Rockefeller Sculpture Garden - Completed in 1949 by David, this is a major outdoor feature of the Museum of Modern Art;
- Abby Aldrich Rockefeller Folk Art Museum - Opened in 1957 by Junior, this is a leading folk art museum just outside the historic district of Junior's Colonial Williamsburg;
- Abby Aldrich Rockefeller Hall - The freshman residence hall on the campus of Spelman College;
- Laura Spelman Rockefeller Memorial Building - Completed in 1918, it is among other things a student residence hall at Spelman College, after the wife of Senior and after whom the college was named;
- Rockefeller State Park Preserve - Part of the 3,400-acre (14 km^{2}) family estate in Westchester County, this 1,233-acre (5 km^{2}) preserve was officially handed over to New York State in 1983, although it had previously always been open to the public;
- Marsh-Billings-Rockefeller National Historical Park - Established as a historical museum of conservation by Laurance during the 1990s.
- John D. Rockefeller Jr. Memorial Parkway - Established in 1972 through Congressional authorization, connecting Yellowstone and Grand Teton National Parks;
- Rockefeller Forest - Funded by Junior, this is located within Humboldt Redwoods State Park, California's largest redwood state park;
- Either of two US congressional committees {in 1972 - John D. III and 1975 - Nelson dubbed the Rockefeller Commission}.
- Rockefeller Park, a scenic park featuring gardens dedicated to several world nations along Martin Luther King Jr. Blvd. between University Circle and Lake Erie in Cleveland.
- Winthrop Rockefeller Institute of the University of Arkansas System was established in 2005 with a grant from the Winthrop Rockefeller Charitable Trust. The educational center with conference and lodging facilities is located on Petit Jean Mountain near Morrilton, Arkansas, on the original grounds of Gov. Winthrop Rockefeller's model cattle farm.
- David Rockefeller Center for Latin American Studies at Harvard University.
- Rockefeller Quad at the Loomis Chaffee School
- Rockefeller Complex library at Niels Bohr Institute, Nørrebro, Copenhagen Municipality in Denmark
- WVU Rockefeller Neuroscience Institute on the medical campus of West Virginia University, established in 2018.

John Jr., through his son Nelson, purchased and then donated the land upon which sits the United Nations headquarters, in New York, in 1946. Earlier, in the 1920s, he had also donated a substantial amount towards the restoration and rehabilitation of major buildings in France after World War I, such as the Rheims Cathedral, the Fontainebleau Palace and the Palace of Versailles, for which he was later (1936) awarded France's highest decoration, the Grand Croix of the Legion d'Honneur (subsequently also awarded decades later to his son, David Rockefeller).

He also funded the excavations at Luxor in Egypt, as well as establishing a Classical Studies School in Athens. In addition, he provided the funding for the construction of the Palestine Archaeological Museum in East Jerusalem - the Rockefeller Museum.

=== Conservation ===
Beginning with John D. Rockefeller Sr., the family has been a major force in land conservation. Over the generations, it has created more than 20 national parks and open spaces, including the Cloisters, Acadia National Park, Forest Hill Park, the Nature Conservancy, the Rockefeller Forest in California's Humboldt Redwoods State Park (the largest stand of old-growth redwoods), and Grand Teton National Park, among many others. John Jr., and his son Laurance (and his son Laurance Jr. aka Larry) were particularly prominent in this area.

The family was honoured for its conservation efforts in November 2005, by the National Audubon Society, one of the United States' largest and oldest conservation organizations, at which over 30 family members attended. At the event, the society's president, John Flicker, stated: "Cumulatively, no other family in America has made the contribution to conservation that the Rockefeller family has made".

In 2016 fifth-generation descendants of John Sr. criticized ExxonMobil, one of the successors to his company Standard Oil, for their record on climate change. The Rockefeller Brothers Fund and the Rockefeller Family Fund both backed reports suggesting that ExxonMobil knew more about the threat of global warming than it had disclosed. David Kaiser, grandson of David Rockefeller Sr. and president of the Rockefeller Family Fund, said that the "...company seems to be morally bankrupt." Valerie Rockefeller Wayne, daughter of former Senator Jay Rockefeller, said, "Because the source of the family wealth is fossil fuels, we feel an enormous moral responsibility for our children, for everyone -- to move forward." The Rockefeller Brothers Fund announced it was divesting from fossil fuels in September 2014, the Rockefeller Family Fund announced plans to divest in March 2016, and the Rockefeller Foundation pledged to dump their fossil fuel holdings in December 2020. With a $5 billion endowment, the Rockefeller Foundation was "the largest US foundation to embrace the rapidly growing divestment movement." CNN writer Matt Egan noted, "This divestment is especially symbolic because the Rockefeller Foundation was founded by oil money." In May 2021 Rockefeller descendants Rebecca Rockefeller Lambert and Peter Gill Case announced a ten-year funding initiative, the Equation Campaign, to fight new fossil fuel development.

=== The archives ===
The Rockefeller family archives are held at the Rockefeller Archive Center in Pocantico Hills, Sleepy Hollow, New York. At present, the archives of John D. Rockefeller Sr. William Rockefeller, John D. Rockefeller Jr., Abby Aldrich Rockefeller, Abby Rockefeller Mauzé, John D. Rockefeller III, Blanchette Rockefeller, and Nelson Rockefeller are processed and open by appointment to readers in the Archive Center's reading room. Processed portions of the papers of Laurance Rockefeller are also open. In addition, the Archive Center has a microfilm copy of the Winthrop Rockefeller papers, the originals of which are held at the University of Arkansas, Little Rock. The papers of the family office, known as the Office of the Messrs. Rockefeller, are also open for research, although those portions that relate to living family members are closed.

== Members ==
=== Ancestors ===
- Godfrey Lewis Rockefeller (1783–1857) (m. 1806) Lucy Avery (1786–1867) (ten children)
  - William Avery Rockefeller Sr. (1810–1906) (m. 1837) Eliza Davison (1813–1889) (eight children)
    - Lucy Rockefeller (1838–1878) (m. 1856) Pierson D. Briggs
    - Clorinda Rockefeller (c. 1838–?, died young) (daughter from Nancy Brown)
    - John Davison Rockefeller Sr. (1839–1937) (m. 1864) Laura Celestia "Cettie" Spelman (1839–1915)
    - Cornelia Rockefeller (c. 1840–?) (daughter from Nancy Brown)
    - William Avery Rockefeller Jr. (1841–1922) (m. 1864) Almira Geraldine Goodsell
    - Mary Ann Rockefeller (1843–1925) (m. 1872) William Cullen Rudd
    - Franklin "Frank" Rockefeller (1845–1917) (m. 1870) Helen Elizabeth Scofield
    - Frances Rockefeller (1845–1847)
- William W. Rockefeller (1788–1851) (m. early 19th century) Eleanor Kisselbrack (1784–1859)

=== Descendants of John Davison Rockefeller Sr. ===
The total number of blood relative descendants as of 2006 was about 150.

- Elizabeth "Bessie" Rockefeller (1866–1906) (m.1889) Charles Augustus Strong (1862–1940)
  - Margaret Rockefeller Strong (1897–1985) (m. 1st 1927) George de Cuevas (1885–1961), (m. 2nd 1977) Raimundo de Larrain
- Alice Rockefeller (1869–1870)
- Alta Rockefeller (1871–1962) (m.1901) Ezra Parmelee Prentice (1863–1955)
  - John Rockefeller Prentice (1902–1972) (m. 1941) Abra Cantrill (1912–1972)
    - Abra Prentice Wilkin (born 1942)
  - Mary Adeline Prentice Gilbert (1907–1981) (m. 1937) Benjamin Davis Gilbert (1907–1992)
  - Spelman Prentice (1911–2000) (m. 3rd 1972) Mimi Walters (four children)
    - Peter Spelman Prentice (born 1940)
      - Alexandra Sartell Prentice (born 1962)
      - Michael Andrew Prentice (born 1964)
- Edith Rockefeller (1872–1932) (m. 1895) Harold Fowler McCormick
  - John Rockefeller McCormick (1896–1901)
  - Editha McCormick (1897–1898)
  - Harold Fowler McCormick Jr. (1898–1973) (m. 1931) Anne "Fifi" Potter (1879–1969)
  - Muriel McCormick (1902–1959) (m. 1931) Elisha Dyer Hubbard (1906)
  - Mathilde McCormick (1905–1947) (m. 1923) Max Oser (1877–1942) (one child)
- John Davison Rockefeller Jr. (1874–1960) (m. 1st 1901) Abigail Greene "Abby" Aldrich (1874–1948)
  - Abigail Aldrich "Babs" Rockefeller (1903–1976) (m. 1st 1925, div. 1954) David M. Milton (1900–1976) (m. 2nd 1946, d. 1949) Irving H. Pardee (1892–1949) (m. 3rd 1953, d. 1974) Jean Mauzé (1903–1974) (two children)
    - Abigail Rockefeller "Abby" "Mitzi" Milton O'Neill (1928–2017) m. George Dorr O'Neill Sr. (six children; eighteen grandchildren)
    - Marilyn Ellen Milton (1931–1980) (two children)
  - John Davison Rockefeller III (1906–1978) (m. 1932) Blanchette Ferry Hooker (four children)
    - Sandra Ferry Rockefeller (1935–2024)
    - John Davison "Jay" Rockefeller IV (1937–2026) (m. 1967) Sharon Percy (four children)
      - John Davison Rockefeller V (born 1969) m. Emily Tagliabue
        - John Davison Rockefeller VI (born 2007)
        - Laura Rockefeller (born 2000)
        - Sophia Percy Rockefeller
      - Justin Aldrich Rockefeller (born 1979) m. Indré Vengris
      - Valerie Rockefeller Wayne
    - Hope Aldrich Rockefeller (born 1938) (three children)
    - Alida Ferry Rockefeller Messinger (born 1949) (m. 1st 1978–1986) Mark Dayton (m. 2nd) William Messinger (three children)
  - Nelson Aldrich Rockefeller (1908–1979) (m. 1st 1930–1962) Mary Todhunter Clark (m. 2nd 1963) Margaretta Large "Happy" Fitler (1926–2015) (seven children)
    - Rodman Clark Rockefeller (1932–2000) (m. 1st 1953–1979) Barbara Ann Olsen (m. 2nd 1980) Alexandra von Metzler (four children)
      - Meile Rockefeller (born 1955)
      - Peter C. Rockefeller (m. 1987) Allison Whipple Rockefeller
    - Steven Clark Rockefeller (born 1936)
      - Steven C. Rockefeller Jr. (born 1960)
    - Mary Clark Rockefeller (born 1938) m. 1st (1961–1974) William J. Strawbridge (three children)
    - Michael Clark Rockefeller (1938–1961)
    - Nelson Aldrich Rockefeller Jr. (born 1964)
    - Mark Fitler Rockefeller (born 1967)
  - Laurance Spelman Rockefeller (1910–2004) (m. 1934) Mary French
    - Laura Spelman Rockefeller Chasin (1936–2015)
    - Marion French Rockefeller (born 1938)
    - Dr. Lucy Rockefeller Waletzky (born 1941)
    - Laurance Rockefeller Jr. (born 1944) (m. 1982) Wendy Gordon (two children)
  - Winthrop Rockefeller (1912–1973) (m. 1st 1948, div. 1954) Jievute "Bobo" Paulekiute (1916–2008) (m. 2nd 1956, div. 1971) Jeannette Edris (1918–1997)
    - Winthrop Paul Rockefeller (1948–2006) (m. 1st 1971, div. 1979) Deborah Cluett Sage (m. 2nd 1983) Lisenne Dudderar (seven children)
      - Andrea Davidson Rockefeller (b. 1972)
      - Katherine Cluett Rockefeller (b. 1974)
      - Winthrop Paul Rockefeller Jr. (b. 1976)
      - William Gordon Rockefeller
      - Colin Kendrick Rockefeller (b. 1990)
      - John Alexander Camp Rockefeller
      - Louis Henry Rockefeller
  - David Rockefeller (1915–2017) (m. 1940) Margaret McGrath (1915–1996)
    - David Rockefeller Jr. (born 1941) (m. 1st divorced) Diana Newell-Rowan (m. 2nd 2008) Susan Cohn (two children)
      - Ariana Rockefeller (born 1982) (m. 1st 2010, div. 2019) Matthew Bucklin
      - Camilla Rockefeller (born 1984)
    - Abigail Rockefeller (born 1943)
    - Neva Goodwin Rockefeller (born 1944) (m. 1st divorced) Walter J. Kaiser (m. 2nd) Bruce Mazlish (1923–2016)
      - David Kaiser (1969–2020)
    - Margaret Dulany "Peggy" Rockefeller (born 1947)
    - Richard Gilder Rockefeller (1949–2014); married to Nancy King (two children, two step-children)
      - Clayton Rockefeller
      - Rebecca Rockefeller
    - Eileen Rockefeller (born 1952) m. Paul Growald (two children)

=== Descendants of William Avery Rockefeller Jr. ===
An article in The New York Times in 1937 stated that William Rockefeller had, at that time, 28 great-grandchildren.

- Lewis Edward Rockefeller (1865–1866)
- Emma Rockefeller McAlpin (1868–1934)
- William Goodsell Rockefeller (1870–1922) (five children)
  - William Avery Rockefeller III (1896–1973) (three children)
    - Elsie Rockefeller m. William Proxmire
  - Godfrey Stillman Rockefeller (1899–1983) (seven children)
    - Godfrey Anderson Rockefeller (1924–2010)
  - James Stillman Rockefeller (1902–2004) (four children)
    - Georgia Rockefeller Rose
      - Andrew Carnegie Rose
        - Louisa d'Andelot du Pont Rose
- John Davison Rockefeller II (1872–1877)
- Percy Avery Rockefeller (1878–1934) m. Isabel Goodrich Stillman (five children)
  - Isabel Stillman Rockefeller (1902–1980) m. Frederic Walker Lincoln IV
    - Isabel Lincoln (1927–2016) m. Basil Beebe (Stephen Basil) Elmer Jr. (1924–2007)
      - David Basil Elmer
      - Lucy Lincoln Elmer
      - Monica Elmer
      - Veronica Hoyt Elmer m. Clinton Richard Kanaga
        - Anthony Kanaga
        - Joshua Kanaga
        - Lindsey Kanaga
    - Calista Lincoln (1930–2012) m. Henry Upham Harder (1925–2004)
      - Frederic Walker Lincoln Harder (b. 1953) m. Karin J. E. Bolang (b. 1954)
        - Frederic Harder
        - Calista Harder
      - Gertrude Upham Lincoln Harder (b. 1955) m. James Briggs
        - Alexander Briggs
        - George Briggs
        - Holly Briggs
        - Katherine Briggs
      - Calista Harder (b. 1957) m. Jan Hollyer
        - Elsa Hollyer
        - Ian Hollyer
      - Holly Harris Harder (b. 1961) m. Bruce Kenneth Catlin (b. 1956)
        - Augustus Attilio Catlin (b. 1997)
        - Nickolas Charles Catlin (b. 2000)
        - Caroline Catlin
      - Henry Upham Harder Jr. (b. 1965) m. Natalie Rae Borrok (b. 1965)
        - Haley Rae Harder (b. 1997)
        - Henry Rolston Harder (b. 1999)
        - Charles Lincoln Harder (b. 2003)
    - Percilla Avery Lincoln (1937–2019) m. William Blackstone Chappell Jr. (1935–2017)
      - Richard Blackstone Chappell (1964–2014)
      - Avery Lincoln Chappell (1966–2005) m. J. Kevin Smith
        - Ellery Smith
        - Emeline Smith
        - Stillman Smith
    - Florence Philena Lincoln (b. 1940) m. Thomas Lloyd Short
  - Avery Rockefeller (1903–1986) m. 1923 Anna Griffith Mark (three children)
  - Faith Rockefeller Model (1909–1960)
    - Robert Model (born 1942)
- Geraldine Rockefeller Dodge (1882–1973) m. Marcellus Hartley Dodge Sr.
  - Marcellus Hartley Dodge Jr. (1908–1930)

=== Spouses ===
- Laura Celestia "Cettie" Spelman (1839–1915) – John D. Rockefeller Sr.
- Abby Greene Aldrich (1874–1948) – John D. Rockefeller Jr.
- Martha Baird Allen (1895–1971) – John D. Rockefeller Jr.
- Mary Todhunter Clark "Tod" (1907–1999) – Nelson Rockefeller
- Margaretta "Happy" Fitler (1926–2015) – Nelson Rockefeller
  - Anne Marie Rasmussen – Steven Clark Rockefeller
- Blanchette Ferry Hooker (1909–1992) – John D. Rockefeller III
  - Sharon Lee Percy – John D. Rockefeller IV
- Mary French (1910–1997) – Laurance Rockefeller
  - Wendy Gordon – Laurance "Larry" Rockefeller Jr.
- Jievute "Bobo" Paulekiute (1916–2008) – Winthrop Rockefeller
- Jeannette Edris (1918–1997) – Winthrop Rockefeller
  - Deborah Cluett Sage – Winthrop Paul Rockefeller
  - Lisenne Dudderar – Winthrop Paul Rockefeller
- Margaret "Peggy" McGrath (1915–1996) – David Rockefeller
  - Diana Newell Rowan – David Rockefeller Jr.
  - Nancy King – Richard Gilder Rockefeller.
- Sarah Elizabeth "Elsie" Stillman (1872–1935) – William Goodsell Rockefeller
- Isabel Goodrich Stillman (1876–1935) – Percy Avery Rockefeller

=== Family tree ===
William Avery Rockefeller
John D. Rockefeller | William Avery Rockefeller Jr. | Frank Rockefeller
Elizabeth Rockefeller Strong | Alta Rockefeller Prentice | Edith Rockefeller McCormick | John D. Rockefeller Jr. | William Goodsell Rockefeller | Percy Avery Rockefeller | Geraldine Rockefeller Dodge
Abby Rockefeller Mauzé | John D. Rockefeller III | Nelson Rockefeller | Laurance Rockefeller | Winthrop Rockefeller | David Rockefeller | William Avery Rockefeller III | Godfrey Stillman Rockefeller | James Stillman Rockefeller | Isabel Rockefeller Lincoln | Avery Rockefeller
John D. Rockefeller IV | Hope Aldrich Rockefeller | Alida Rockefeller Messinger | Rodman Rockefeller | Steven Clark Rockefeller | Michael Rockefeller | Mark Rockefeller | Laura Rockefeller Chasin | Marion Rockefeller Weber | Lucy Aldrich Rockefeller | Laurance Rockefeller Jr. | Winthrop Paul Rockefeller | David Rockefeller Jr. | Neva Goodwin | Peggy Dulany | Richard Rockefeller | Eileen Rockefeller Growald | Godfrey A. Rockefeller
Justin Rockefeller | Meile Rockefeller

== Network ==
=== Associates ===
The following is a list of figures closely aligned with or subordinate to the Rockefeller family.

- Gianni Agnelli
- Nelson W. Aldrich
- John Dustin Archbold
- Jabez A. Bostwick
- Benjamin Brewster
- Samuel P. Bush
- Duncan Candler
- Daniel O'Day
- C. Douglas Dillon
- J. Richardson Dilworth
- Samuel Calvin Tate Dodd
- William Lukens Elkins
- Henry Morrison Flagler
- Simon Flexner
- Henry Clay Folger
- Joseph B. Foraker
- Raymond B. Fosdick
- Herman Frasch
- Frederick Taylor Gates
- George Gilder
- Jerome Davis Greene
- Harkness family
- Mark Hanna
- William Rainey Harper
- E.H. Harriman
- Wallace Harrison
- Oliver Burr Jennings
- William Lyon Mackenzie King
- Henry Kissinger
- Ivy Lee
- John J. McCloy
- McCormick family
- Charles Edward Merriam
- William S. Paley
- Richard Parsons
- Oliver H. Payne
- Charles H. Percy
- Peter G. Peterson
- Pratt family
- Matthew Quay
- Eddie Rickenbacker
- Henry H. Rogers
- Beardsley Ruml
- John D. Ryan
- Jacob Schiff
- Louis Severance
- James Stillman
- Feargus B. Squire
- Walter Teagle
- Henry Morgan Tilford
- Paul Volcker
- John C. Whitehead

=== Businesses ===
The following is a list of businesses in which the Rockefeller family have held a controlling or otherwise significant interest.

- Allegheny Transportation Company
- American Smelting & Refining Company
- Anaconda Copper
- Apple Computer, Inc.
- Arabian-American Oil Company
- Atchison, Topeka and Santa Fe Railway
- Atlantic Petroleum
- Baltimore & Ohio Railroad
- Brooklyn Rapid Transit Company
- Buckeye Steel Castings
- Chase Manhattan Bank
- Chicago, Milwaukee & St. Paul Railroad
- Chrysler Corporation
- Clivus Multrum, Inc.
- Colorado Fuel and Iron
- Consolidation Coal Company
- Consolidated Edison, Inc.
- Continental Oil
- Cranston Print Works
- Cushman & Wakefield, Inc.
- Duluth, Missabe & Northern Railway
- Eastern Air Lines
- Intel Corporation
- Intercontinental Rubber Company of New York
- International Basic Economy Corporation
- Itek
- Kyso
- Marquardt Corporation
- McDonnell Aircraft Corporation
- Mutual Alliance Trust Company
- Ohio Oil Company
- National City Bank of New York
- Paravel
- Piasecki Helicopter
- Public Service Corporation of New Jersey
- Reaction Motors
- RKO Pictures
- Rockefeller Apartments
- Rockefeller Capital Management
- Rockefeller Group
- RockResorts
- Santa Fe Reporter
- Schroder, Rockefeller & Company
- Socal
- Socony-Vacuum Oil
- South Penn Oil Company
- Sohio
- Standard Oil Company, Inc.
- Standard Oil of Indiana
- Standard Oil of New Jersey
- Union Sulphur Company
- Union Tank Car Company
- United Gas Improvement Corporation
- U.S. Steel (1901–1911)
- Venrock
- Western Maryland Railway
- Wheeling & Lake Erie Railway

=== Philanthropies and Miscellaneous Nonprofit Organizations ===
The following is a list of philanthropies and other non-profit institutions which were created by or have otherwise been closely tied to the Rockefeller family.

- Abby Aldrich Rockefeller Folk Art Museum
- Asia Society
- Central Philippine University
- China Medical Board
- Council of the Americas
- Council on Foreign Relations
- David Rockefeller Center for Latin American Studies
- General Education Board
- Group of 30
- Industrial Relations Counselors, Inc.
- Institute for Pacific Relations
- International House of New York
- International Rice Research Institute
- Jackson Hole Preserve, Inc.
- John D. Rockefeller Jr. Library
- John D. Rockefeller III College
- Johns Hopkins Bloomberg School of Public Health
- K.W. Institute of Anthropology, Human Heredity & Eugenics
- Laura Spelman Rockefeller Memorial
- Maine Coast Heritage Trust
- Memorial Sloan Kettering Cancer Center
- Michael Rockefeller Wing of the Met
- Museum of Automobiles
- Museum of Modern Art
- Nelson A. Rockefeller College of Public Affairs & Policy
- New York Cancer Hospital
- Population Council
- Rockefeller Archeological Museum
- Rockefeller Archive Center
- Rockefeller Brothers Fund
- Rockefeller Foundation
- Rockefeller Institute of Government
- Rockefeller Philanthropy Advisors
- Rockefeller University
- Sleepy Hollow Restorations
- Social Science Research Council
- Spelman College
- Trilateral Commission
- United Nations Association
- University of Chicago
- Winrock International
- Winthrop Rockefeller Institute

== Buildings, estates and historic sites ==
- Bassett Hall
- Colonial Williamsburg
- The Casements
- The Cloisters
- Eliza Davison House
- Elm Tree House
- Embarcadero Center
- The Eyrie Summer Home
- First Baptist Church of Tarrytown
- Forest Hill
- Forest Hill Park (Ohio)
- Giralda Farms
- Grand Teton National Park
- Great Smoky Mountains National Park
- Greenacre Park
- Headquarters of the United Nations
- The Interchurch Center
- JY Ranch
- Kykuit
- Lincoln Center
- Marsh-Billings-Rockefeller National Historical Park
- Mount Hope Farm
- Ocean County Park
- One Chase Manhattan Plaza
- Overhills
- Riverside Church
- Rockefeller Center
- Rockefeller Chapel
- Rockefeller Golf House
- Rockefeller Guest House
- Rockefeller State Park Preserve
- The Rocks
- Rockwood Hall
- Strong House (Vassar College)
- Standard Oil Building
- Villa Le Balze
- Virgin Islands National Park
- William Murray Residences
- World Trade Center (1973–2001)

== See also ==
- Gilded Age
