= Bruce Mazlish =

American historian (1923–2016)

- Born: September 15, 1923; Brooklyn, New York, United States
- Died: November 27, 2016 (aged 93); Cambridge, Massachusetts, United States
- Spouse: Neva Goodwin
- Relatives: David Rockefeller (father-in-law); David Kaiser (stepson)
- Awards: Toynbee Prize (1987)

Academic background
- Education: Columbia University (BA, MA, PhD)
- Doctoral advisor: Jacques Barzun

Academic work
- Discipline: Historiography
- Institutions: Massachusetts Institute of Technology

Bruce Mazlish (September 15, 1923 – November 27, 2016) was an American historian who was a professor in the Department of History at the Massachusetts Institute of Technology. His work focused on historiography and philosophy of history, history of science and technology, artificial intelligence, history of the social sciences, the two cultures and bridging the humanities and sciences (natural and social), revolution, psychohistory, history of globalization and the history of global citizenship. He worked to build the latter two fields of inquiry into a public intellectual movement, through initiatives such as the New Global History conferences.

== Early life and education ==
Bruce Mazlish was born in Brooklyn, New York, in 1923. His father, Louis Mazlish, had immigrated as a teenager from what was then Russia. A largely self-taught engineer and entrepreneur, Louis Mazlish started a laundry service for which he developed much of the equipment. He married Lee Reuben in 1919, and had three children, of whom Bruce was the middle, with an older brother Robert and a younger sister, Elaine.

Bruce Mazlish attended local public primary schools in Brooklyn and then elected to go to Boys High School, which drew its students on a city-wide basis. Upon graduation he entered Columbia University in 1940.

Having enlisted in the Officer's Reserve Corps, Mazlish was called up in 1943, and underwent basic training in the US infantry. Subsequently he served in the Office of Strategic Services, assigned to the East Asian arena, in Morale Operations. When the war ended, Columbia granted him a catch-up BA dated 1944.

Mazlish worked as a journalist at The Washington Daily News (now defunct) for half of a year, spent a year with his wife in Mexico working on a novel, and then worked at a third-rate prep school, teaching English (for which he was qualified) and History (which he learned by reading one chapter ahead of his students). Teaching the latter gave him an original view of the discipline, and the G.I. Bill drove educational expansion and demand for teachers in the post-WWII years.

In this way, Mazlish stumbled onto the path of the academic world, teaching history for two years at the University of Maine, Brunswick campus, and then completing advanced degrees at Columbia University in literature (MA thesis: “Defoe: Criminologist,” 1947) and then a Ph.D in Modern European History, where he worked mainly under Professors Shepherd Clough and Jacques Barzun (thesis on “Burke, Bonald and De Maistre: A Study in Conservative Thought”, 1955)."

== Scholarship ==
Mazlish was hired as an instructor at MIT in 1955. He became full Professor in the MIT History Department in 1965. Aside from a couple of years when he completed his PhD, and then a few years teaching and researching abroad, he remained in active teaching at MIT until fall 2003, when he assumed emeritus status. Some of his course offerings included "Marx, Darwin and Freud," "Modernity, Post-modernity and Capitalism," and "The New Global History."

Mazlish was an editor of, and contributor to, several collected volumes, and the author of over two dozen books (with translations into six different languages), as well as several dozen more articles and reviews in over two dozen peer-reviewed journals (a couple of which he founded) in addition to various periodicals.

Notable among his publications are: The Western Intellectual Tradition (1960; co-authored with Jacob Bronowski, this became a classic used in university courses and translated into many languages), Psychoanalysis and History (1963 edited volume), The Riddle of History: The Great Speculators from Vico to Freud (1966), The Revolutionary Ascetic (1976), A New Science: The Breakdown of Connections and the Birth of Sociology (1989), The Leader, the Led, and the Psyche (1990), Conceptualizing Global History (1991, co-edited with Ralph Buultjens), The Fourth Discontinuity: The Co-Evolution of Humans and Machines (1993), The Uncertain Sciences (1998), The Global History Reader (2005, co-edited with Akira Iriye, based on a course co-taught at Harvard in 2004), The New Global History (2006), and The Idea of Humanity in a Global Era (2009). He also wrote psychohistorical biographies on Richard Nixon (written at the time of the Watergate hearings, and receiving wide popular attention and acclaim), Henry Kissinger, and James and John Stuart Mill.

His articles appeared in peer-reviewed journals such as History and Theory, American Historical Review, Historically Speaking, and New Global Studies, as well as periodicals for a more general audience, including Book Review Digest, Center Magazine, Encounter, The Nation, The New Republic, New York Magazine, and The Wilson Quarterly. Reviews of his books appeared in a wide range of publications, including The Christian Science Monitor, Fortune Magazine, The New York Review of Books, and The New York Times.

In 1960, he was a founding associate editor of History and Theory, helping to edit it for ten years. In 1969 he was instrumental in the establishment of the Journal of Interdisciplinary History, helping to secure its financial and institutional footing, and serving on its Board of Advisors from its founding until his death.

Mazlish was substantively involved in the major ongoing activity of the Toynbee Foundation, the New Global History Initiative, which organized several international conferences and since 2007 has published the New Global Studies Journal (a peer-reviewed electronic journal). Mazlish was one of the editors, along with Nayan Chanda (Yale), Akira Iriye (Emeritus, Harvard), Saskia Sassen (Columbia), and Kenneth Weisbrode (Managing Editor).

Mazlish was also one of the founding members of the Wellfleet Psychohistory Group.

In 2004, the journal Historically Speaking, on the occasion of an interview with Mazlish, conducted by its editor, Donald Yerxa, described him as "identified with several seemingly disparate intellectual pursuits", including psychohistory, the history of the social sciences, and the new field of "global history", which he was then helping to shape.

== Awards and honors ==
Mazlish was elected a fellow of the American Academy of Arts and Sciences in 1967. The academy funded a project examining the feasibility of psychohistory; Mazlish was a primary investigator, along with Erik Erikson, Philip Rieff, Robert Lifton, and others.

In 1972-73 Mazlish was a recipient of a Social Science Research Council Faculty Fellowship and made a visiting member of the Institute for Advanced Study.

From 1974 to 1979, Mazlish served as head of MIT’s Department of Humanities (Course XXI). At the time, there were 11 “sections” representing their disciplines (this amounted to about 140 faculty), an unwieldy administrative structure. When he stepped down, he recommended that each section became an autonomous department; this occurred a few years later.

Mazlish received the Toynbee Prize for 1986-87. Other recipients include George F. Kennan, Ralf Dahrendorf, Arthur M. Schlesinger, Jr., and Albert O. Hirschman. He also served on the board of trustees (1992-2007), and as president (1997-2006), of the Toynbee Prize Foundation, which is an affiliated society of the American Historical Association, and sponsors one session at the association's annual meeting, when the prize is awarded.

Mazlish served on the Scholars Council for the Kluge Prize of the Library of Congress, 2000-2003, and on the governing board of the Rockefeller Archive Center, 1999-2005.

Invited lectures included the Remsen Bird Honorary Lecture at Occidental College, the Presidential Lecture at Brown University, along with innumerable others in the United States and abroad, including in Argentina, India, Great Britain, and Russia."

The MIT History faculty held a symposium, "World into Globe – History for the 21st Century" to celebrate his work and teaching in 2011.

Mazlish's books received several honors, including the Hudson Book Club Selection, Book Find Club Selection, and Kayden National Book Award (1994-1995, for his 1993 The Fourth Discontinuity.

== Personal life ==
Mazlish was married to Neva Goodwin, daughter of David Rockefeller, an economist and co-director of the Global Development And Environment Institute at Tufts University, with whom he published and edited several works. Previously, he was married to Constance Shaw (fellow OSS officer in WWII), and to Anne Austin. He had two children from his first marriage, Cordelia and Peter Shaw, two from his second, Anthony and Jared Mazlish, and two stepchildren, David and Miranda Kaiser. He died on November 27, 2016, in Cambridge, Massachusetts, and was eulogized in The New York Times, by several at the Toynbee Prize Foundation, by MIT News, and at an MIT Memorial service.

== Bibliography ==
- (1960) with Jacob Bronowski The Western Intellectual Tradition: From Leonardo to Hegel (New York/London: Harper and Row).
  - (1963) Revised edition (England: Penguin Books).
  - (1962) Italian translation (Milan: Edizioni di Communita).
  - (1963) Spanish translation (Madrid: Editorial Norte y Sur).
  - (2012) Turkish translation (Ankara: Say Yayinlari).
- (1963) Editor, Psychoanalysis and History (Englewood Cliffs, NJ: Prentice-Hall).
  - (1971) Revised edition (New York: Grosset and Dunlap).
- (1965) Editor with Introduction, The Railroad and the Space Program: An Exploration in Historical Analogy (Cambridge: MIT Press).
- (1966) The Riddle of History: The Great Speculators from Vico to Freud (New York/London: Harper and Row).
  - (1968) Paperback edition (New York: Minerva Press).
- (1971) Co-Editor with A. D. Kaledin and D. B. Ralston Revolution: A Reader (New York: Macmillan).
- (1972) In Search of Nixon: A Psychohistorical Inquiry (New York: Basic Books).
  - (1973) Paperback edition (Baltimore, MD: Penguin Books).
  - (2014) Reissued (New Brunswick, NJ: Transaction Press), with a new Introduction, "Stress, Crisis, and Psychohistory: In Search of Nixon, by Howard G. Schneiderman
  - (1973) Japanese translation (Tokyo: The Simul Press).
  - (1973) Dutch translation (Amsterdam: Uitgeverij De Lage Landen B.V.).
- (1975) James and John Stuart Mill: Father and Son in the 19th-Century (New York: Basic Books).
  - (1988) Paperback edition with new introduction (New Brunswick, NJ: Transaction Press).
- (1976) Kissinger: The European Mind in American Policy (New York: Basic Books).
  - (1977) French translation (Presses Universitaires de France).
- (1976) The Revolutionary Ascetic: Evolution of a Political Type (New York: Basic Books).
  - (2014) Paperback edition with new preface (New Brunswick, NJ: Transaction Publishers).
- (1979) with Edwin Diamond Jimmy Carter: A Character Portrait (New York: Simon and Schuster).
- (1984) The Meaning of Karl Marx (New York: Oxford University Press).
  - (1988) Second edition (New York: Oxford University Press).
- (1989) A New Science: The Breakdown of Connections and the Birth of Sociology (New York: Oxford University Press).
  - (1993) Paperback edition (University Park, PA: Pennsylvania State University Press).
- (1990) The Leader, the Led, and the Psyche (Hanover/London: University Press of New England).
  - (2013) Paperback edition with new preface (New Brunswick, NJ: Transaction Publishers).
- (1993) Co-Editor with [www.scps.nyu.edu/content/scps/faculty/faculty-profile.html?id=5918&name=Ralph-Buultjens Ralph Buultjens], Conceptualizing Global History (Boulder, CO: Westview Press).
- (1993) The Fourth Discontinuity: The Co-Evolution of Humans and Machines (New Haven: Yale University Press)
  - (1995) Paperback edition (New Haven: Yale University Press).
  - (1995) Spanish translation (Madrid: Alianza Editorial).
  - (1995) Japanese translation (Tokyo: Japan UNI Agency, Inc.).
  - (1996) German translation (Insel Verlag).
  - (2001) Korean translation (Seoul: ScienceBooks).
- (1996) Co-Editor with Leo Marx, Progress: Fact or Illusion? (Ann Arbor: University of Michigan Press)
  - (1998) Paperback edition.
- (1998) The Uncertain Sciences (New Haven: Yale University Press).
  - (2007) Paperback edition (New Brunswick, NJ: Transaction Publishers).
- (2004) Civilization and Its Contents (Stanford, CA: Stanford University Press).
  - (forthcoming) Arabic translation.
  - (forthcoming) Chinese translation.
- (2005) Co-Editor with Alfred D. Chandler, Jr. Leviathans: Multinational Corporations and the New Global History (UK: Cambridge University Press).
  - (2006) Korean translation (Seoul: Veritas Books).
- (2005) Co-Editor with Akira Iriye, The Global History Reader (New York: Routledge).
- (2006) The New Global History (New York/London: Routledge).
- (2007) Co-Editor with Nayan Chanda and Kenneth Weisbrode, The Paradox of a Global USA (Stanford, CA: Stanford University Press).
- (2009) The Idea of Humanity in a Global Era (New York: Palgrave Macmillan) doi:10.1057/9780230617766
- (2013) Reflections on the Modern and the Global (New Brunswick, NJ: Transaction Publishers).
- (2015) Globalization and Transformation (New Brunswick, NJ: Transaction Publishers).
- his personal blog, where he has written about current events

=== Selected articles ===
- The Conservative Revolution of Edmund Burke, The Review of Politics 20:1 (Jan., 1958), pp. 21–33 doi:10.1017/S0034670500020842
- History and Morality, The Journal of Philosophy 55:6 (Mar. 13, 1958), pp. 230–240 doi:10.2307/2022420
- The Idea of Progress, Daedalus 92:3, Themes in Transition (Summer 1963), pp. 447–461 JSTOR 2022420
- The Fourth Discontinuity, Technology and Culture 8:1 (Jan., 1967), pp. 1–15 doi:10.2307/3101522
- Group Psychology and Problems of Contemporary History, Journal of Contemporary History 3:2, Reappraisals (Apr., 1968), pp. 163–177 doi:10.1177/002200946800300210
- The French Revolution in Comparative Perspective, Political Science Quarterly 85:2 (Jun., 1970), pp. 240–258. doi:10.2307/2146945
- What is Psychohistory?, Transactions of the Royal Historical Society 21, Fifth Series (1971), pp. 79–99. doi:10.2307/3678921
- The Tragic Farce of Marx, Hegels, and Engels: A Note, History and Theory 11:3 (1972), pp. 335–337. doi:10.2307/2504684
- Following the Sun, The Wilson Quarterly 4:4 (Autumn, 1980), pp. 90–93. link
- Crèvecoeur's New World, The Wilson Quarterly 6:4 (Autumn, 1982), pp. 140–147. link
- The Quality of The Quality of Science: An Evaluation, Science, Technology, & Human Values 7:38 (Winter, 1982), pp. 42–52. JSTOR 689459
- The Wealth of Adam Smith (with Neva Goodwin), Harvard Business Review 4:52 (Jul/Aug 1983), pp. 52ff.
- The American Psyche, in 1990, The Leader, the Led and the Psyche, (Hanover/London: University Press of New England
- The Question of The Question of Hu, History and Theory 31:2 (May, 1992), pp. 143–152. doi:10.2307/2505593
- A Triptych: Freud's The Interpretation of Dreams, Rider Haggard's She, and Bulwer-Lytton's The Coming Race, Comparative studies in society and history 35:4 (Oct. 1993), pp. 726–745. doi:10.1017/s0010417500018685
- Some Observations on the Psychology of Political Leadership, Political Psychology 15:4 (Dec., 1994), pp. 745–753. doi:10.2307/3791632
- Christopher Fox, Roy Porter, and Robert Wokler eds., Inventing Human Science: Eighteenth-Century Domains (review), The American Historical Review 102.2 (1997), pp. 444–445. doi:10.1086/ahr/102.2.444-a
- Psychohistory and the Question of Global Identity, Psychohistory Review 25 (1997), pp. 165–176. doi:10.2307/3791632
- Comparing global history to world history, Journal of Interdisciplinary History (1998), pp. 385–395. JSTOR 205420
- A Tour of Globalization, Indiana Journal of Global Legal Studies 7 (1999), pp. 5. pdf
- On voluntary servitude: False consciousness and the theory of ideology, Journal of the History of the Behavioral Sciences 34:2 (Spring 1998), pp. 195–197. doi:10.1002/(SICI)1520-6696(199821)34:2<195::AID-JHBS16>3.0.CO;2-P
- Big questions? Big history? History and Theory 38:2 (1999), pp. 232–248. doi:10.1111/0018-2656.00088
- For Charlie and Nick [a review of: Harry Collins and Martin Kusch, The Shape of Actions: What Humans and Machines Can Do], Nature 398:6727 (1999), pp. 478–479. doi:10.1038/19014
- Jürgen Osterhammel, Colonialism: A Theoretical Overview [trans. Shelley L. Frisch] (review), Journal of World History 10.1 (1999), pp. 232–234. doi:10.1353/jwh.2005.0018
- The Norton History of the Human Sciences (review)." Journal of Interdisciplinary History 30.2 (1999), pp. 294–296. doi:10.1162/jinh.1999.30.2.294
- Before the great binary divide, Nature 404:6777 (2000), pp. 434–435. doi:10.1038/35006507
- Ernst Cassirer's Enlightenment: An Exchange with Robert Wokler, Studies in Eighteenth-Century Culture 29.1 (2000), pp. 349–359. doi:10.1353/sec.2010.0297
- Invisible Ties From Patronage to Networks, Theory, Culture & Society 17.2 (2000), pp. 1–19. doi:10.1177/02632760022051086
- The Art of Reviewing, Perspectives on History: The News Magazine of the American Historical Society, Feb. 2001. link
- Civilization in a historical and global perspective, International Sociology 16.3 (2001), pp. 293–300. doi:10.1177/026858001016003003
- Noel Parker Revolutions and History: An Essay in Interpretation (review), The American Historical Review 106:3 (2001), pp. 925–926. doi:10.1086/ahr/106.3.925
- Reflections on the human sciences and their history, History of the Human Sciences 14.4 (2001), pp. 140–147. doi:10.1177/095269510101400407
- Empiricism and History, Historically Speaking 4.3 (2003), pp. 12–14. doi:10.1353/hsp.2003.0084
- The Past and Future of Psychohistory, Annual of Psychoanalysis 31 (2003), pp. 251–262. link
- A Tale of Two Enclosures Self and Society as a Setting for Utopias, Theory, Culture & Society 20:1 (2003), pp. 43–60. doi:10.1177/0263276403020001920
- 1897, Historically Speaking 6:6 (2005), pp. 23–23. doi:10.1353/hsp.2005.0013
- Big History, Little Critique, Historically Speaking 6:5 (2005), pp. 43–44. doi:10.1353/hsp.2005.0090
- The global and the local, Current Sociology 53:1 (2005), pp. 93–111. doi:10.1177/0011392105048290
- The Hi-jacking of Global Society? An Essay, Journal of Civil Society 1:1 (2005), pp. 5–17. doi:10.1080/17448680500166031
- The Hi-jacking of Global Society? A Rebuttal, Journal of Civil Society 1:2 (2005), pp. 191–193. doi:10.1080/17448680500337616
- Roudometof: A dialogue, Current Sociology 53:1 (2005), pp. 137–141. doi:10.1177/0011392105048293
- Global history, Theory, Culture & Society 23:2-3 (2006), pp. 406–408. doi:10.1177/026327640602300272
- Progress in History, Historically Speaking 7.5 (2006), pp. 18–21. doi:10.1353/hsp.2006.0051
- Revisiting Barraclough's Contemporary History, New Global Studies 2:3 (2008) doi:10.2202/1940-0004.1033
- Globalization Nationalized, New Global Studies 3:3 (2009). doi:10.2202/1940-0004.1085
- The Joy of War and the Future of Humanity, New Global Studies 4:3 (2011). doi:10.2202/1940-0004.1121
- Ruptures in history, Historically Speaking 12:3 (2011), pp. 32–33. doi:10.1353/hsp.2011.0044
- Social Bonding, Globalization, and Humanity, New Global Studies 5:3 (2011). doi:10.2202/1940-0004.1148
- Crimes and Sovereignty, New Global Studies 6:1 (2012). doi:10.1515/1940-0004.1171
- From the Sentiment of Humanity to the Concept of Humanity, Historically Speaking 13:3 (2012), pp. 30–33. doi:10.1353/hsp.2012.0038
- Three Factors of Globalization: Multinational Corporations, Non-Governmental Organizations, and Global Consciousness, Globality Studies Journal (2012). link
- The New Global Merchants of Light, New Global Studies 7:1 (2013), pp. 25–31. doi:10.1515/ngs-2013-002
- The Imprint of the Global, New Global Studies 8:2 (2014), pp. 177–182. doi:10.1515/ngs-2014-0021
