= David Kaiser (philanthropist) =

American philanthropist (1969–2020)

- Born: David Walter Kaiser; July 27, 1969; Cambridge, Massachusetts, U.S.
- Died: July 15, 2020 (aged 50); Mount Desert Island, Maine, U.S.
- Education: Columbia University (BA)
- Occupations: philanthropist, activist
- Known for: president of the Rockefeller Family Fund, activism against ExxonMobil
- Spouse: Rosemary Corbett
- Parent(s): Neva Rockefeller Goodwin; Walter J. Kaiser
- Relatives: Bruce Mazlish (stepfather)
- Family: See Rockefeller family

David Walter Kaiser (July 27, 1969 – July 15, 2020) was an American philanthropist and president of the Rockefeller Family Fund, known for his environmental activism. He was a grandson of David Rockefeller, the great grandson of American financer John D. Rockefeller Jr. and great-great-grandson of Standard Oil founder John D. Rockefeller.

== Early life and education ==
Kaiser was born on July 27, 1969, in Cambridge, Massachusetts to Neva Rockefeller Goodwin and Walter Kaiser. His mother is a daughter of David Rockefeller and a great-granddaughter of John D. Rockefeller. She is the director of the Global Development and Environment Institute at Tufts University and a distinguished fellow at Boston University. His father Walter Kaiser, who died in 2016, was a professor of English and comparative literature at Harvard University as well as the director of Villa I Tatti, the Harvard University Center for Italian Renaissance Studies in Florence. In 1981, his mother divorced Kaiser and remarried MIT historian Bruce Mazlish.

He graduated from Columbia College of Columbia University in 1991 with a degree in American history.

== Career ==
Kaiser served as president of the Rockefeller Family Fund from 2015 to 2019. During his tenure as president, he gained wide attention for funding the investigation of Los Angeles Times and InsideClimate News into ExxonMobil's environmental malpractices and leading the family fund to divest from fossil fuels. Activist groups, funded by the foundation, also kicked off a campaign #ExxonKnew, accusing that ExxonMobil has knowingly downplayed the threat of climate change. He laid out his case against the company, detailing its practices of financing climate contrarianism and driving partisanship on the issue, in a two-part essay published in The New York Review of Books, where he once worked as an editorial assistant.

With the family's encouragement and using the evidence provided by the family-funded investigations, a number of states, cities, and individuals sued ExxonMobil for its environmental practices. The New York Times wrote that John Passacantando, a philanthropy consultant and climate activist, said in an interview that Kaiser had "done more to change the landscape in the climate fight than anything I have seen in 30 years."

Kaiser was also the chairman of Just Detention International from 2007 to 2019, an advocacy group dedicated to end sexual abuse in prison. He also served on the board of Winrock International, founded by his granduncles Winthrop Rockefeller and John D. Rockefeller III, from 2004 to 2012.

== Personal life ==
Kaiser died of brain cancer on July 15, 2020, at his family home on Mount Desert Island, Maine. He is survived by his wife, Rosemary Corbett, whom he married in 2012, and his sister, Miranda Kaiser, who became president of the Rockefeller Family Fund in 2019.

== See also ==
- ExxonMobil climate change controversy
- Rockefeller family
