= Schmollers Jahrbuch =

Economics and social science journal

- Discipline: Economics, Political Science, Political Economy, Sociology, Anthropology
- Language: English
- Edited by: Peter Boettke, Nils Goldschmidt, Stefan Kolev, Stephen Ziliak, Joachim Zweynert

Publication details
- History: 1871–present
- Publisher: Duncker & Humblot
- Frequency: Quarterly

Standard abbreviations
- ISO 4: Schmollers Jahrb.

Indexing
- ISSN: 1439-121X (print); 1865-5742 (web)
- LCCN: 00234411
- OCLC no.: 782966325

Links
- Journal homepage

Schmollers Jahrbuch: Journal of Contextual Economics is an English-language, peer-reviewed economics and social science journal. It is under the editorship of Peter Boettke (George Mason University), Nils Goldschmidt (University of Siegen), Stefan Kolev (University of Applied Sciences Zwickau), Stephen Ziliak (Roosevelt University) and Joachim Zweynert (Witten/Herdecke University).

The journal, named after Gustav von Schmoller, an influential figure in the Historical school of economics, provides a forum for contextual social science research, focusing on the embeddedness of economic activity within political, social, ecological and cultural settings.

Since its founding in 1871, the journal has been published by Duncker & Humblot. It is published four times a year, including one special issue annually. For the 2016 special issue, the journal (based on von Schmoller's 1881 article "The Idea of Justice in Political Economy") published a series of essays on the same topic. In 2017, the focus was on institutions in development research. The 2018 issue saw the translation into English of previously untranslated seminal works of German socio-economics from 1896 to 1938. The special issue 2019 focused on "Liberalism for the 21st century".

== History ==
- The journal was founded in 1871 by Franz von Holtzendorff under the name Jahrbuch für Gesetzgebung, Verwaltung und Rechtspflege des Deutschen Reiches.
- In 1877 Gustav von Schmoller assumed editorship; the name of the journal changed to Jahrbuch für Gesetzgebung, Verwaltung und Volkswirtschaft im Deutschen Reiche.
- Commemorating von Schmoller's long-standing editorship, the name of the journal was changed in 1913 to the eponymous title of Schmollers Jahrbuch für Gesetzgebung, Verwaltung und Volkswirtschaft.
- In 1968 the journal is renamed Schmollers Jahrbuch für Wirtschafts- und Sozialwissenschaften.
- A further name change in 1972 to Zeitschrift für Wirtschafts- und Sozialwissenschaften; from 1997-1999, the journal served as the medium of publication for the Verein für Socialpolitik.
- In 2000 the name is changed to Schmollers Jahrbuch - Zeitschrift für Wirtschafts- und Sozialwissenschaften, also receiving the English subtitle Journal of Applied Social Science Studies.
- Under new editorship, the journal is renamed Journal of Contextual Economics – Schmollers Jahrbuch in 2016.
- Editorship of the journal is expanded to five editors in 2020.
