= Nayan Chanda =

Indian magazine editor

Nayan Chanda (born 1946 in India) is the founder and editor-in-chief of YaleGlobal Online, an online magazine that publishes articles about globalisation. The magazine launched in 2001. Control of the magazine was transferred in 2013 from the Yale Center for the Study of Globalization to the Whitney and Betty MacMillan Center for International and Area Studies at Yale.

Previously he served as a correspondent and editor of the Far Eastern Economic Review and has co-authored numerous books on Southeast Asian affairs and globalisation. He is best known for his 1986 book Brother Enemy: The War After the War, which details the events leading up to the outbreak of the Cambodian–Vietnamese War (also known as the "Third Indochina War") in the context of the Cold War that had divided the world.

== Education ==
Chanda graduated from Presidency College in Calcutta with a degree in history. He stood first in his class during his Master of Arts degree in history from Jadavpur University. Between 1971 and 1974 he continued his studies in international relations at the Sorbonne in Paris, France, where he was writing a thesis on the domestic roots of Cambodian foreign policy under Norodom Sihanouk.

== Career ==
While he was in the midst of writing his thesis, he was offered a job in 1974 at the Far Eastern Economic Review to serve as its Indochina correspondent based out of Saigon, Vietnam. Curious to find out more about the Vietnam War, he decided to become a journalist to see history being made. In April 1975, Chanda decided to remain as a journalist even after the fall of Saigon.

Chanda reported as the Indochina Correspondent for the Hong Kong-based Far Eastern Economic Review until 1980. In 1980, he was appointed Diplomatic Correspondent. From 1984 until 1989, Chanda was the Washington, D.C., correspondent of the Review. He was also senior fellow at the Carnegie Endowment for International Peace in Washington, D.C., from 1989 to 1990. In the 1990s he was editor of the Asian Wall Street Journal Weekly and later for the Far Eastern Economic Review.

He is a frequent contributor to the opinion page of the International Herald Tribune and is a member of the advisory council for the Center for Northeast Asian Policy Studies at the Brookings Institution. In 2005 he won the Shorenstein Prize for Journalism.

In May 2009 Chanda was the second expert witness called to testify at the trial of Kang Kek Iew in the Extraordinary Chambers in the Courts of Cambodia.

He used to reside in New Haven, Connecticut, and was the director of publications and the editor of YaleGlobal Online at the Yale Center for the Study of Globalization. His most recent book, Bound Together: How Traders, Preachers, Adventurers and Warriors Shaped Globalization discusses the complexity of globalisation and its historic roots. He was also a senior fellow at the Carnegie Endowment for International Peace.

He is now based in New Delhi, India and is an associate professor of international studies at Ashoka University.

== Selected works ==
- Nayan Chanda (1986). Brother Enemy: The War After the War. Harcourt. ISBN 0-15-114420-6.
- Nayan Chanda, ed. (2002). The Age of Terror: America and the World After September 11. New York, NY: Simon and Schuster. ISBN 0-465-08356-0.
- Nayan Chanda (2007). Bound Together: How Traders, Preachers, Warriors and Adventurers Shaped Globalization. New Haven, CT: Yale University Press. ISBN 978-0-300-11201-6.
- The book has been translated into Chinese, Italian, Portuguese, Japanese, Korean, Turkish and French
