= Margaret Rockefeller =

American conservationist (1915–1996)

Margaret McGrath Rockefeller
- Born: Margaret McGrath; September 28, 1915
- Died: March 26, 1996 (aged 80)
- Spouse: David Rockefeller (m. 1940)
- Children: David Jr.; Abigail; Neva; Margaret; Richard; Eileen

Margaret "Peggy" McGrath Rockefeller (September 28, 1915 – March 26, 1996) was a founding member of two land conservation organizations: the Maine Coast Heritage Trust in 1970 and the American Farmland Trust which was formed in 1980 as a national farmland conservation organization. Throughout her life she was a board member of many organizations and raised funds for conservation projects across the United States of America. She died in 1996 at the age of 80 in New York Hospital.

== Early years ==
Margaret was born to Francis Sims and Neva van Zandt Smith McGrath on 28 September 1915. Growing up in Mt. Kisco, NY she went to school first at the Rippowam School in Bedford, NY followed by the Shipley School in Bryn Mawr, Pa., then the Chapin School in New York. In the 1930s, she met David Rockefeller whom she married in 1940 at Bedford, New York. During the 1970s, Margaret started to raise cattle on land close to Rockefeller summer home at Seal Harbor, Bartlett Island in Maine and then at the couple's home in Tarrytown, N.Y. She became a breeder of Simmental cattle, purchasing four farms in western Columbia County, N.Y. in the 1980s, including The Hermitage, a Livingston family estate which she had torn down in 1983.

== Interest in conservation ==
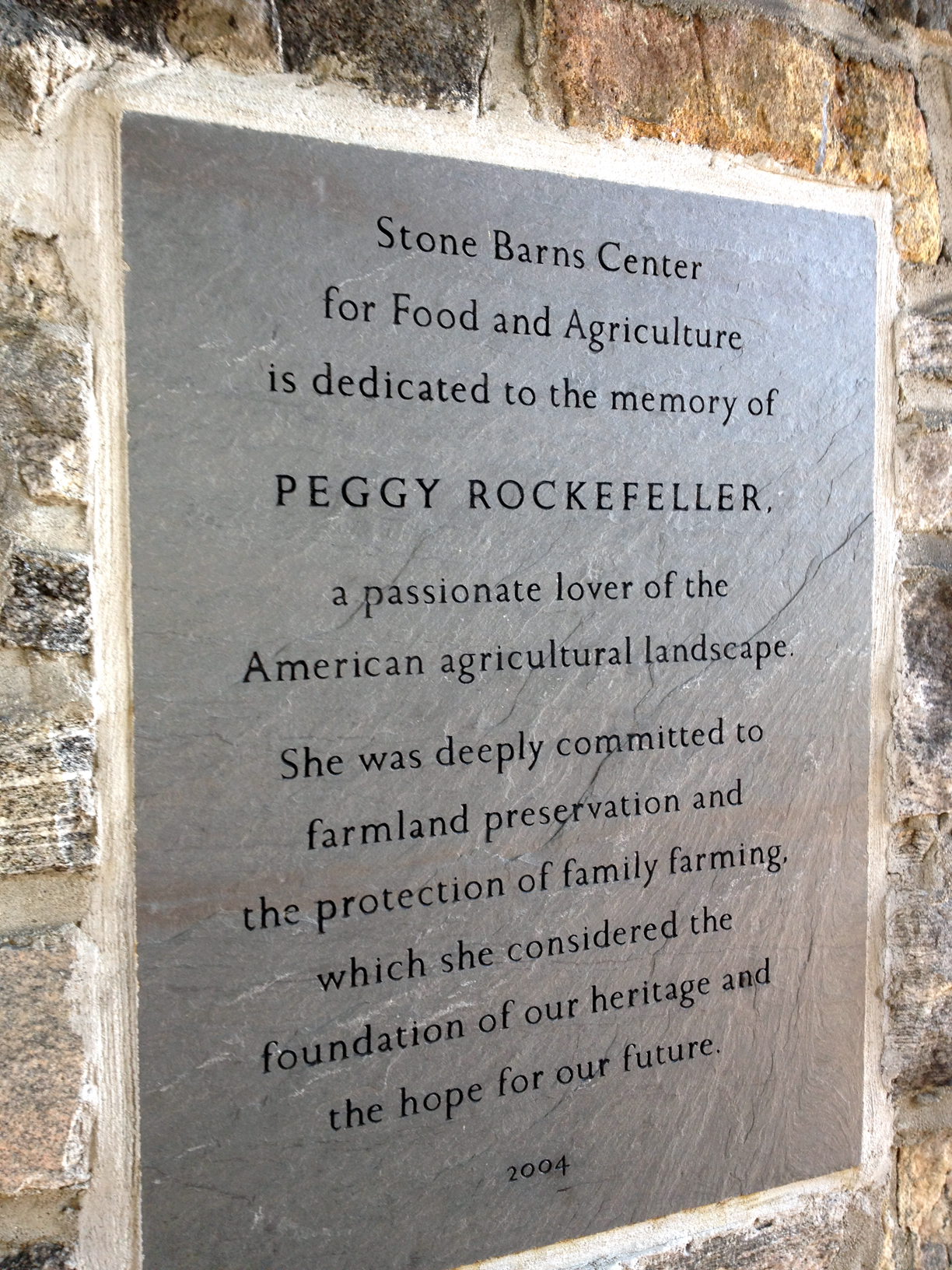
Peggy Rockefeller plaque at Stone Barns Center

Margaret Rockefeller was the sole founder of the Maine Coast Heritage Trust and was its chair for a number of years. The Trust has conserved around 66,000 acres and many buildings in Maine and works towards keeping wildlife habitats, establishing public access to the coast, and providing educational support. One of the trust's projects is dedicated to the memory of Margaret Rockefeller, the Stone Barns Center, which displays a plaque commemorating her commitment to farmland preservation.

Although the American Farmland Trust was founded by a group of farmers including Margaret, she is recognized as its instigator. Other founders include Patrick Noonan and William K. Reilly. Its remit is not only to protect farmland from being developed for other uses, but also to promote farming methods that prevent soil erosion and ensure good soil health.

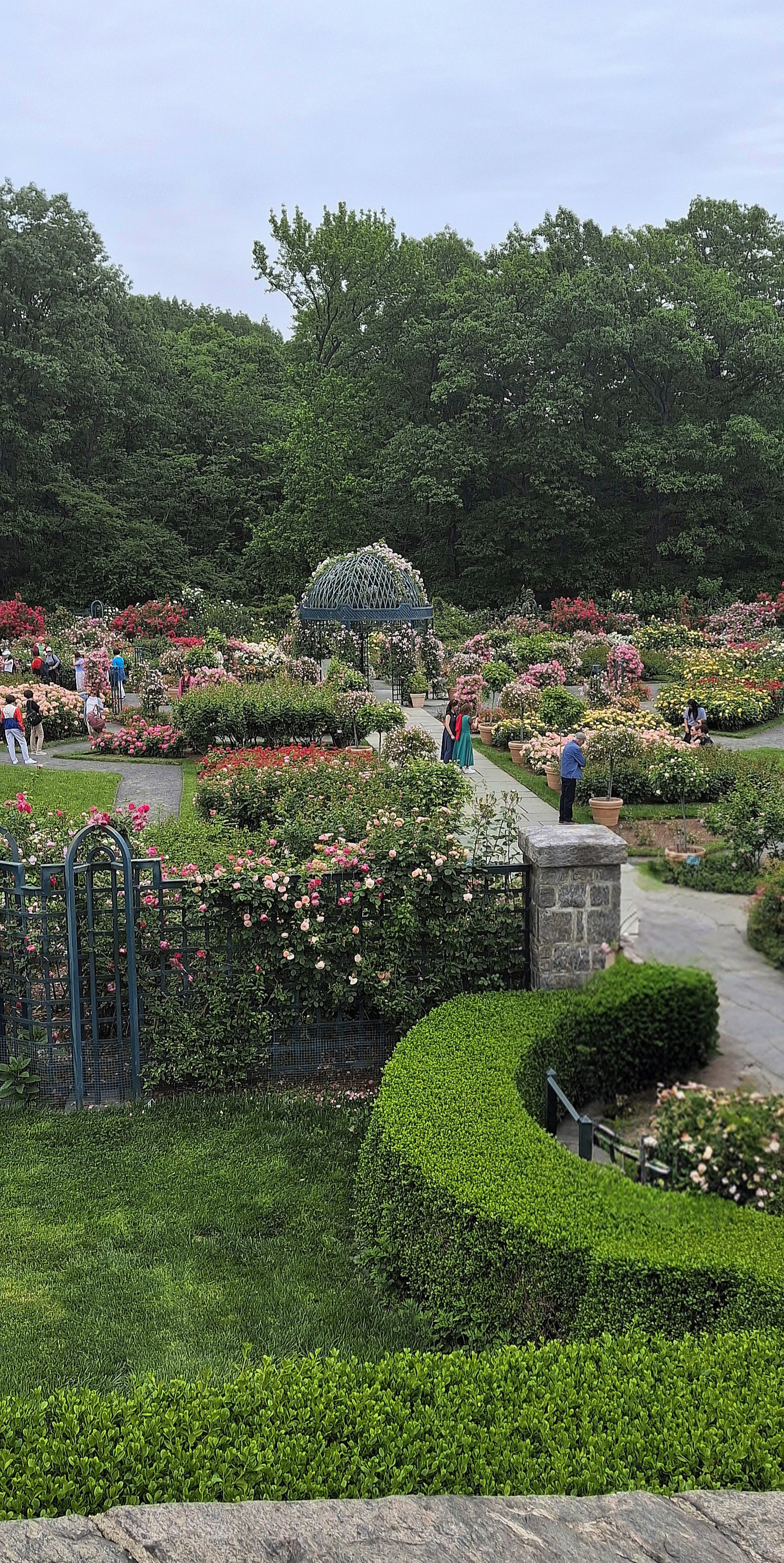
Peggy Rockefeller Rose Garden

Other organizations she supported include membership of Nature Conservation and National Historic Trust. She was a trustee of the New York Philharmonic from 1953 to 1970 and was a board member of the New York Botanical Garden. The garden produced a series of six books about the wild flowers of America in response to an idea from Margaret who raised $500,000 for the project by organizing the National Committee for the Wild Flowers of the United States. The garden restored a two-acre rose garden in 1988 which had originally been designed by Beatrix Jones Farrand in 1916. Margaret's husband donated $1 million for the project and it was named the "Peggy Rockefeller Rose Garden".

Margaret died on March 26, 1996, apparently from complications following heart surgery.
