= North Country School =

Private boarding school in the United States

Coordinates: 44°13′29″N 73°53′47″W

Location
- 4382 Cascade Road Lake Placid, New York, US 12946

Information
- Type: Private boarding school
- Established: 1938
- Headmaster: Todd Ormiston
- Faculty: 40
- Grades: 4-9
- Enrollment: 90
- Average class size: 12
- Student to teacher ratio: 3:1
- Campus size: 333 acres (135 ha)
- Accreditation: New York State Association of Independent Schools (NYSAIS)
- Website: northcountryschool.org

North Country School (also called NCS) is an independent junior boarding and day school for boys and girls in grades four through nine. Its 333-acre campus is in Lake Placid, New York, United States, in the Adirondack High Peaks. North Country School's campus includes a beach on Round Lake, a ski hill, gardens and a farm. The main building houses classrooms, a computer lab, dining room, Quonset gymnasium, art studios, dark room, music practice rooms, and administrative offices. North Country School shares its property with Camp Treetops.

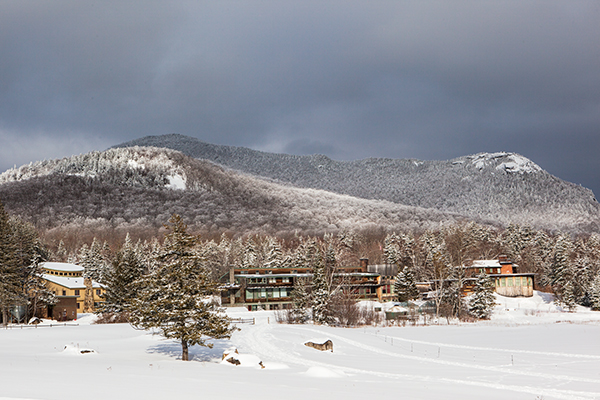
Photograph of the main campus for the North Country School, located in Lake Placid, NY USA.

== History ==
Walter and Leonora Clark, both progressive educators, founded North Country School in 1938. The year the school opened, the Clarks' six students and two teachers lived in Camp Treetops' buildings while the first school building was under construction. The property was owned by Mrs. Clark's sister and brother-in-law, Helen and Douglas Haskell, who ran Camp Treetops starting in 1929 following its founding by Douglas Slesinger in 1921. The Clarks envisioned a school that would extend Treetops' ideals of "personal choice balanced by vibrant community" and "time outdoors for meaningful work, unstructured play and discovery" into classroom learning.

== Buildings and facilities ==
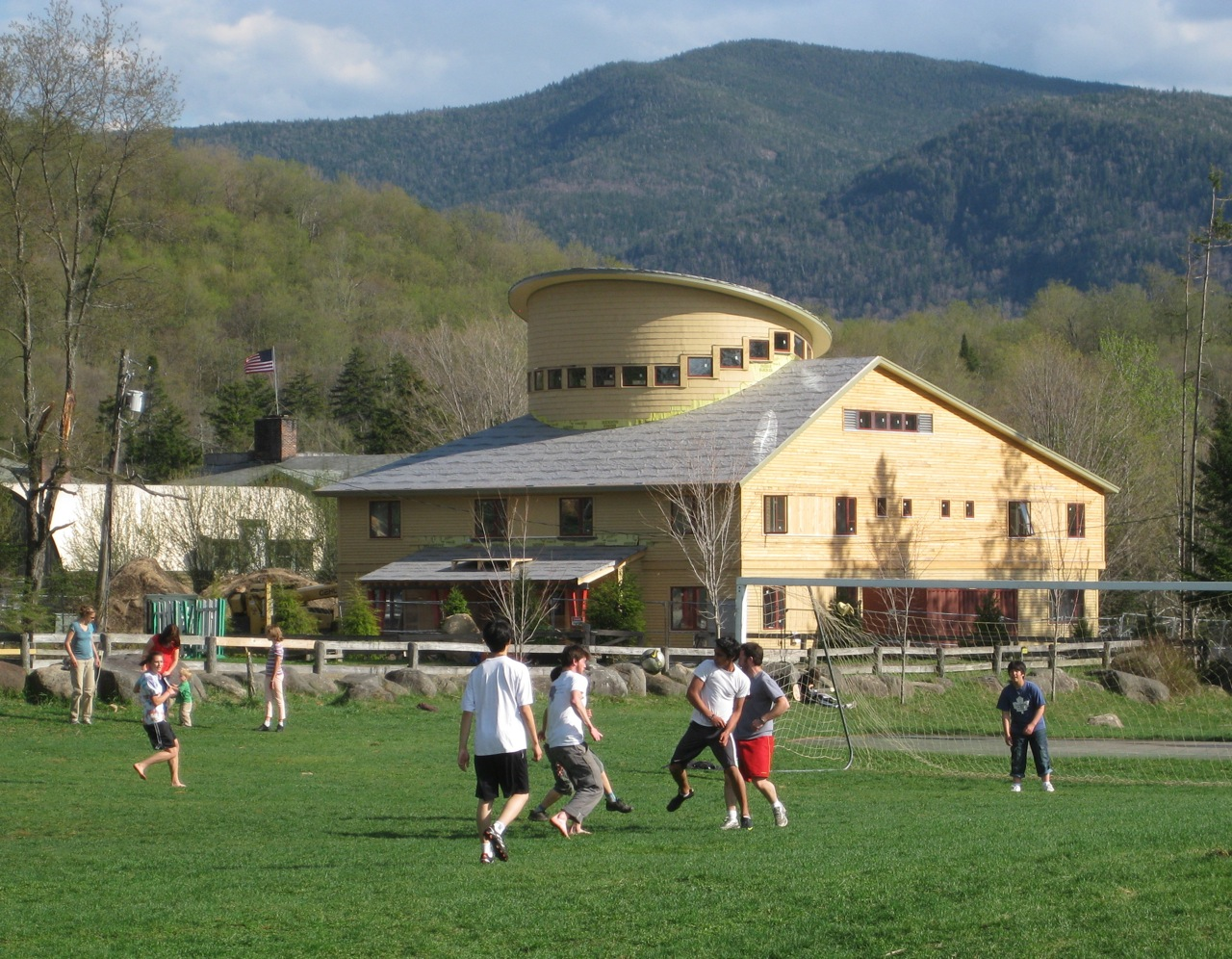
The Clark House of the North Country School

Many buildings on the North Country School campus are considered to be architecturally significant. Douglas Haskell (1899-1979), an American writer, architecture critic and champion of modern architecture in America, owned the property for over 40 years and designed many of the original buildings with the natural surroundings in mind.

The main building, built in 1938 and expanded in 1946, owes its design to Douglas Haskell and Henry Churchill. It has classrooms, a computer lab, dining room, Quonset gymnasium, art studios, dark room, music practice rooms, and administrative offices. The campus has undergone upgrades including the construction of a Timber frame art and dance performance pavilion (2002), the construction of student residence Clark House (2010), the addition of a high-efficiency biomass heating plant (2013), and an award-winning renovation of an 1880s barn (2013).

The RockE House and Basecamp opened in 2017. The Performing Arts Center (PAC) opened in 2019.

== Academics ==
In addition to a traditional core curriculum with experiential learning in five subject areas plus foreign language and learning support, North Country School has 27 studio arts and 17 performing arts classes.

== Sports ==
- Alpine skiing
- Basketball (team)
- Equestrian (team)
- Hiking
- Ice climbing
- Ice skating
- Mountain biking
- Nordic skiing (team)
- Rock climbing
- Snowboarding
- Soccer (team)

== Governance ==
North Country School & Camp Treetops is governed by a ~25-member Board of Trustees. The School and Camp are one 501 (c)(3) non-profit organization that receives charitable gifts from parents, friends and alumni/ae.

== Memberships / affiliations ==
- National Association of Independent Schools (NAIS)
- Junior Boarding Schools Association (JBSA)
- The Association of Boarding Schools (TABS)

== Notable alumni ==
- Andrea Gruber, singer
- Adam Guettel, composer-lyricist
- Yasmin Aga Khan, philanthropist
- David Loud, musician and conductor
- Richard Rockefeller, physician, philanthropist
- Eileen Rockefeller Growald, author, philanthropist
- Matt Salinger, actor
- Robel Teklemariam, Olympian)
- Jessica Tuck, actress
- David Sloan Wilson, evolutionary biologist
