= Abby Rockefeller =

Abby Rockefeller may refer to:

- Abby Rockefeller (ecologist) (born 1943), American ecologist and feminist from the Rockefeller family
- Abby Aldrich Rockefeller (1874–1948), socialite and philanthropist, grandmother of the ecologist
- Abby Rockefeller Mauzé (1903–1976), philanthropist, daughter of the socialite and aunt of the ecologist
