= Kykuit =

Historic house in New York, United States

- John D. Rockefeller Estate (Kykuit)
- U.S. National Register of Historic Places
- U.S. National Historic Landmark
- New York State Register of Historic Places
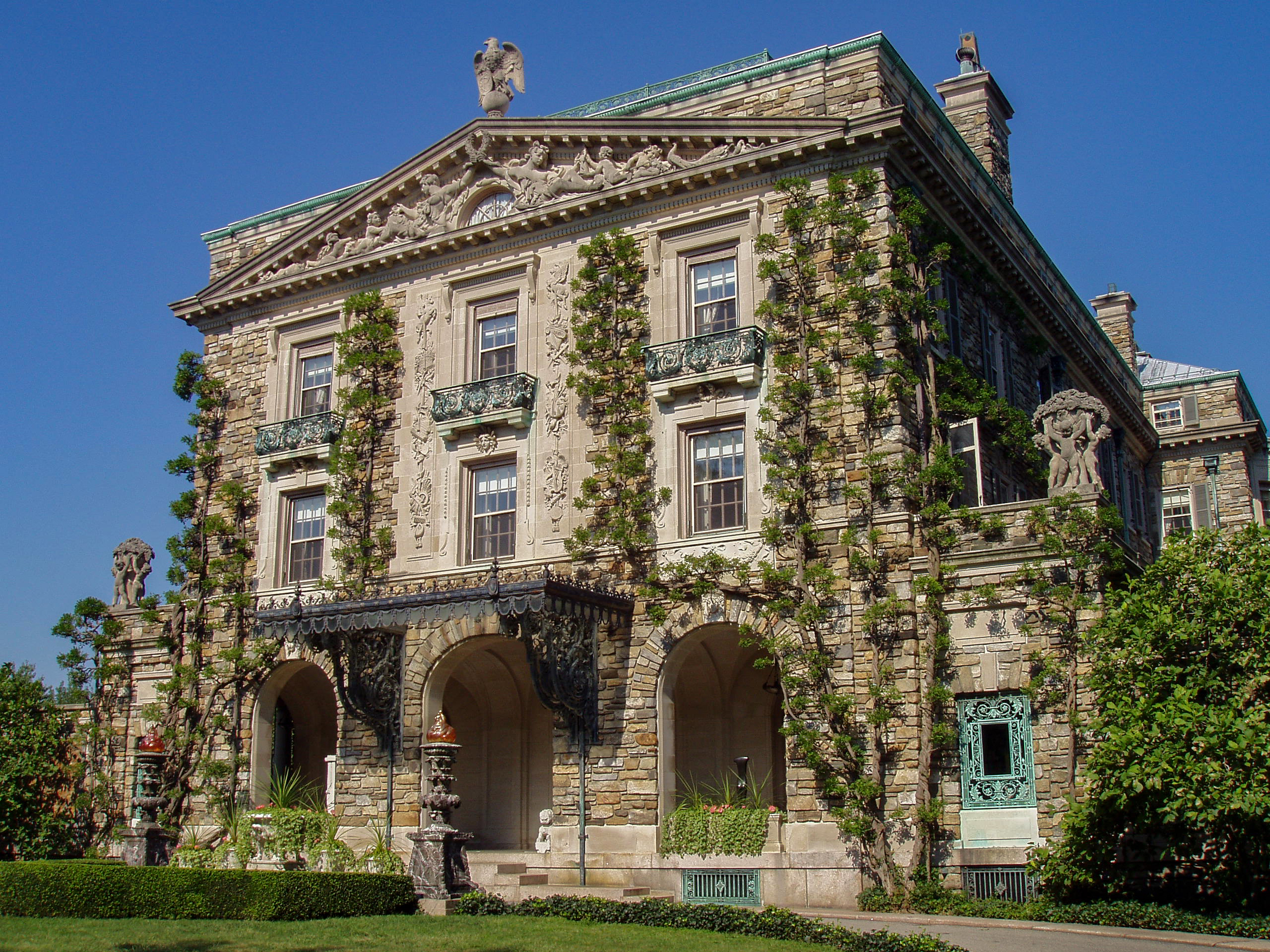
- Front facade, designed by William Welles Bosworth
- Interactive map of John D. Rockefeller Estate (Kykuit)
- Location: 200 Lake Road, Pocantico Hills, New York
- Coordinates: 41°05′22.6″N 73°50′40″W
- Area: 3,400 acres (1,380 ha)
- Built: 1913
- Architects: Delano & Aldrich; William Welles Bosworth (landscape and renovations)
- Architectural style: Colonial Revival
- NRHP reference No.: 76001290
- NYSRHP No.: 11908.000228

Significant dates
- Added to NRHP: May 11, 1976
- Designated NHL: May 11, 1976
- Designated NYSRHP: June 23, 1980

Kykuit (/ˈkaɪkət/ KY-kət), known also as the John D. Rockefeller Estate, is a 40-room historic house museum in Pocantico Hills, a hamlet in the town of Mount Pleasant, New York, 25 miles (40 km) north of New York City. The house was built for oil tycoon and Rockefeller family patriarch John D. Rockefeller. Conceived largely by his son, John D. Rockefeller Jr., and enriched by the art collection of the third-generation scion, Governor of New York, and Vice President of the United States, Nelson Rockefeller, it was home to four generations of the family. The house is a National Historic Landmark owned by the National Trust for Historic Preservation, and tours are given by Historic Hudson Valley.

Kykuit (in modern Dutch spelling Kijkuit, also uitkijk, is a compound noun meaning "lookout, look-out") is situated on the highest point in Pocantico Hills, overlooking the Hudson River at Tappan Zee. Located near Tarrytown and Sleepy Hollow, it has a view of the New York City skyline 25 miles (40 km) to the south.

== History ==
John D. Rockefeller purchased land in the area as early as 1893, after his brother William had moved into a 204-room mansion, Rockwood Hall, nearby. When Rockefeller and his son chose Pocantico Hills as their residence, he quietly purchased multiple homes and properties in the area, and used the houses for himself and his family and staff, or to rent out. Rockefeller and his wife Laura Spelman Rockefeller moved into one of these, the Parsons-Wentworth House, in 1893. The couple would spend winter weekends and parts of each summer and fall there, sharing the upstairs rooms with their adult children and in-laws, pending construction of the manor house.

The Parsons-Wentworth House burned down on September 17, 1902, and the Kent House became their temporary residence until rebuilding could occur. The New York Times mentioned that Rockefeller had never been satisfied with the destroyed house's electric wiring, which had been installed before certain safety measures were developed. He had ordered workers to reroute the wires into conduits, work which had been planned to commence the day after it was pre-empted by the fire. The loss was estimated at $40,000. Kykuit, designed by the firm of Delano & Aldrich, was completed in 1913.

The estate was designated a National Historic Landmark in 1976. In 1979, its occupant, Nelson Rockefeller, bequeathed upon his death his one-third interest in the estate to the National Trust for Historic Preservation. Today, Kykuit is open to the public for tours conducted by Historic Hudson Valley.

== Main mansion ==
Kykuit was designed originally as a steep-roofed three-story stone mansion by the architects Chester Holmes Aldrich and William Adams Delano. Aldrich was a distant relative of Abby Aldrich Rockefeller, wife of John Rockefeller's son John D. Rockefeller Jr.; Abby was involved as artistic consultant and in the interior design of the mansion. The initial eclectic building took six years to complete, but Mrs. Rockefeller did not like the resulting structure, and it was substantially rebuilt into its present four-story Classical Revival Georgian form. Completed in 1913, it has two basement levels filled with interconnecting passageways and service tunnels. The home's interiors were designed by Ogden Codman Jr., and feature collections of Chinese and European ceramics, fine furnishings, and 20th-century art.

Kykuit was renovated and modernized in 1995 by New Haven architect Herbert S. Newman and Partners. Included were major infrastructure changes enabling the estate to accommodate group tours of the first floor and art gallery, as well as a reconfiguration of third and fourth floor staff quarters into guest suites.

== Gardens ==
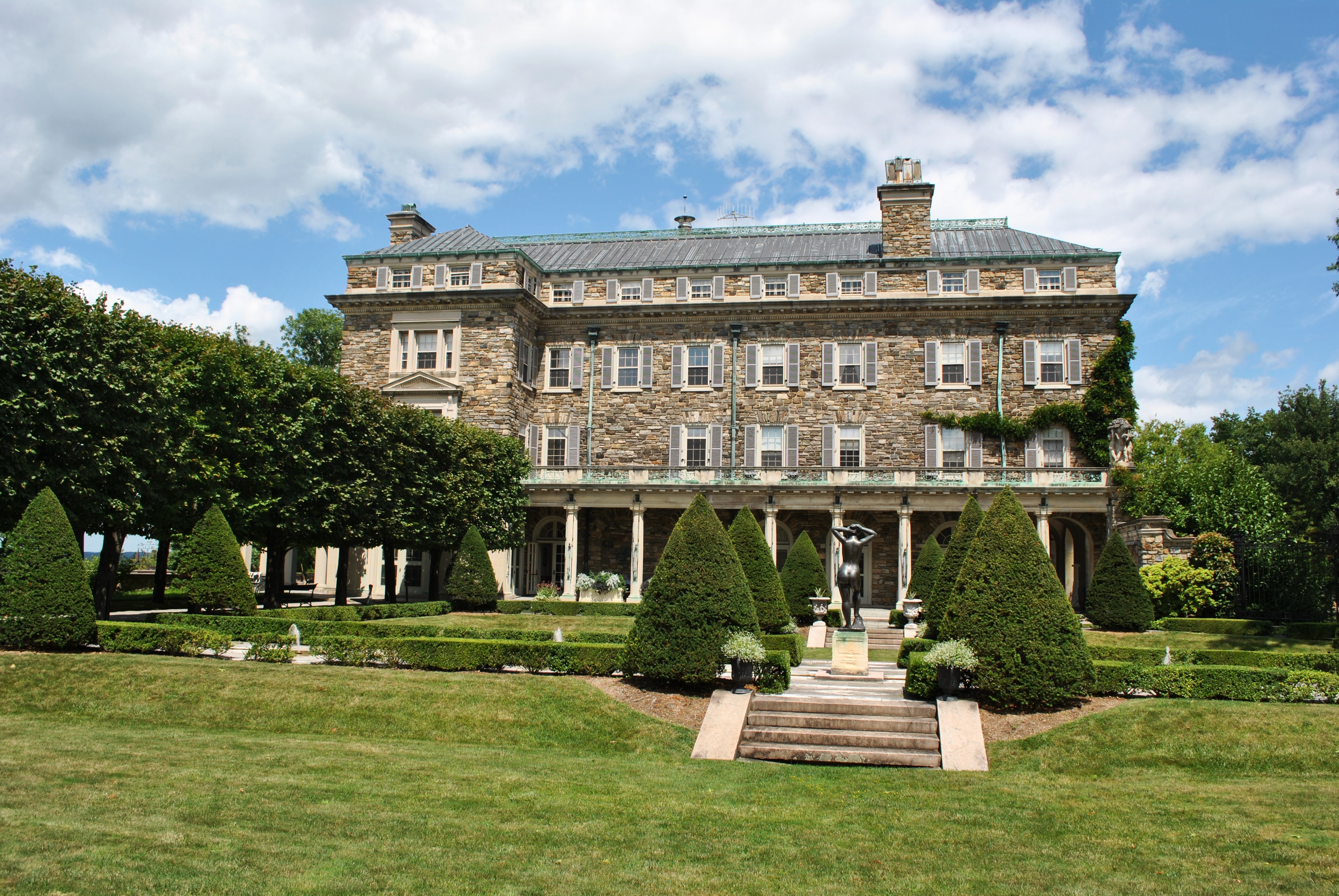
Southwestern elevation of Kykuit

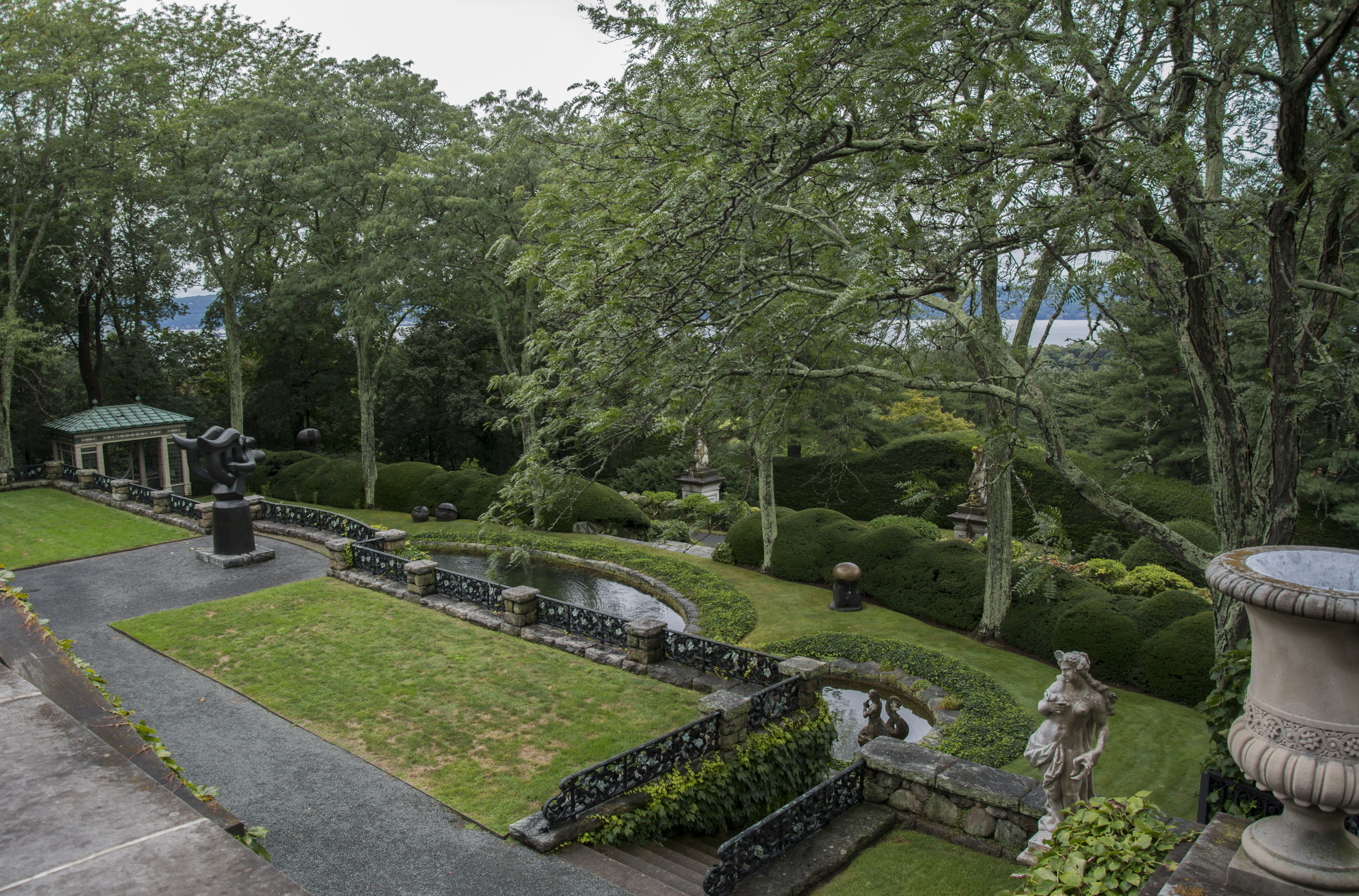
One of several gardens

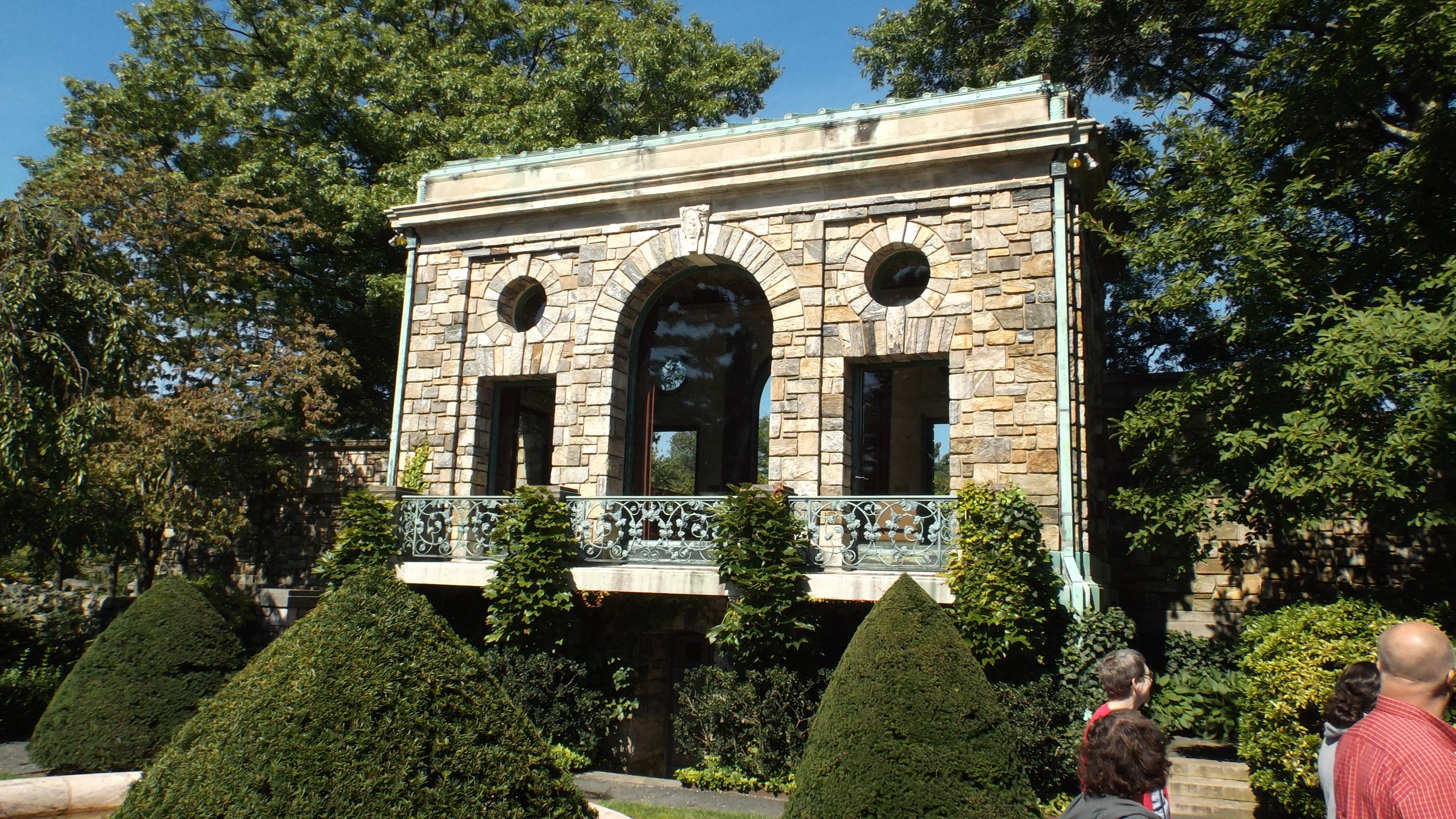
Kykuit's tea house

Initially, the task of landscaping of the grounds was assigned to the Olmsted Brothers firm. Rockefeller Senior was unhappy with their work, however, and assumed control of the design himself, transplanting whole mature trees, designing lookouts and the several scenic winding roads. In 1906, the further design of Kykuit's grounds was undertaken by architect William Welles Bosworth, who designed the surrounding terraces and gardens with fountains, pavilions and classical sculpture. These gardens in the Beaux-Arts style are considered some of Bosworth's best work in the United States, looking out over very fine views of the Hudson River. A few years later, Bosworth would design the Neo-Classical main building complex and landscaping for the new campus of the Massachusetts Institute of Technology in Cambridge, Massachusetts.

Bosworth's original gardens still exist, with plantings carefully replaced over time, although his entrance forecourt was extended in 1913. The terraced gardens include a Morning Garden, Grand Staircase, Japanese Garden, Italian Garden, Japanese-style brook, Japanese Tea-house, large Oceanus fountain, Temple of Aphrodite, loggia, and semicircular rose garden.

== Art collection ==
Distributed through the estate are numerous artworks reflecting the tastes of the past occupants. Governor Nelson Rockefeller collected and displayed many 20th century artworks, with a focus on abstract works from the 1950s through the 1970s. He was also very influential in the selection of artworks for the Governor Nelson A. Rockefeller Empire State Plaza Art Collection, located next to the New York State Capitol in Albany, New York.

Nelson Rockefeller transformed previously empty basement passages beneath the mansion that had led to a grotto into a major private art gallery containing paintings by Picasso, Chagall, and Warhol, the latter two having visited the estate. Between 1935 and the late 1970s more than 120 works of abstract, avant-garde, and modern sculpture from Nelson's collection were added to the gardens and grounds, including works by Pablo Picasso (Bathers), Constantin Brâncuși, Karel Appel (Mouse on Table), Jean Arp, Alexander Calder, Alberto Giacometti, Georg Kolbe (Ruf der Erde), Gaston Lachaise, Aristide Maillol, Henry Moore, Louise Nevelson, Isamu Noguchi (Black Sun), and David Smith.

== Public tours ==
The inner park area was opened to restricted conducted tours of the mansion and immediate surrounds in 1994, but remains occupied and controlled by the Rockefeller Brothers Fund, which leased the area from the National Trust for Historic Preservation in 1991 and serves as steward of what is referred to as "the historic area".

Public tours are conducted by Historic Hudson Valley, an organization established in 1951 by John D. Rockefeller Jr. "to celebrate the region's history, architecture, landscape, and material culture, advancing its importance and thereby assuring its preservation." Shuttle vans run from a visitor center located at the Philipsburg Manor House on Route 9 in Sleepy Hollow, New York.

== Pocantico, the family estate ==
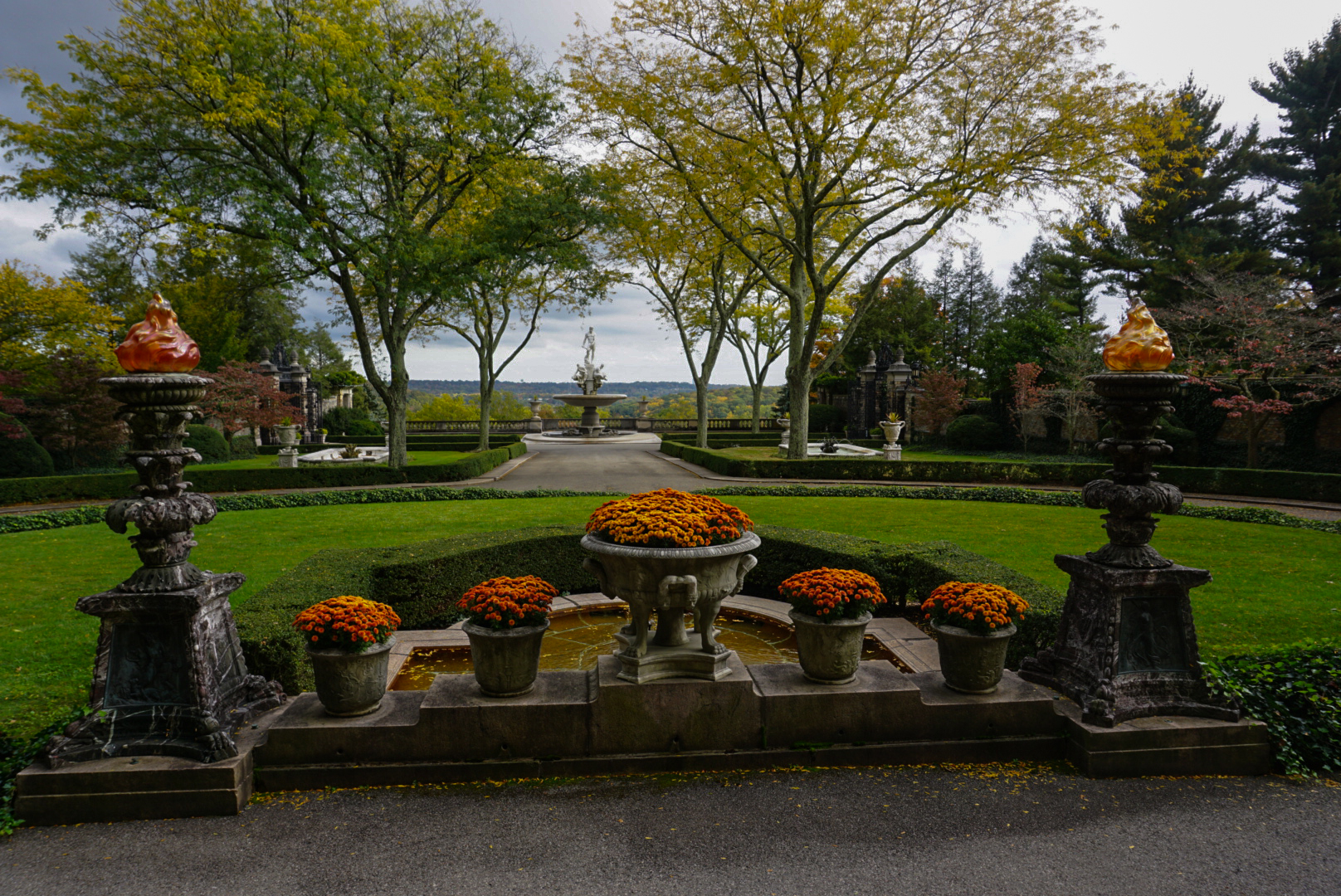
View from Kykuit's entryway

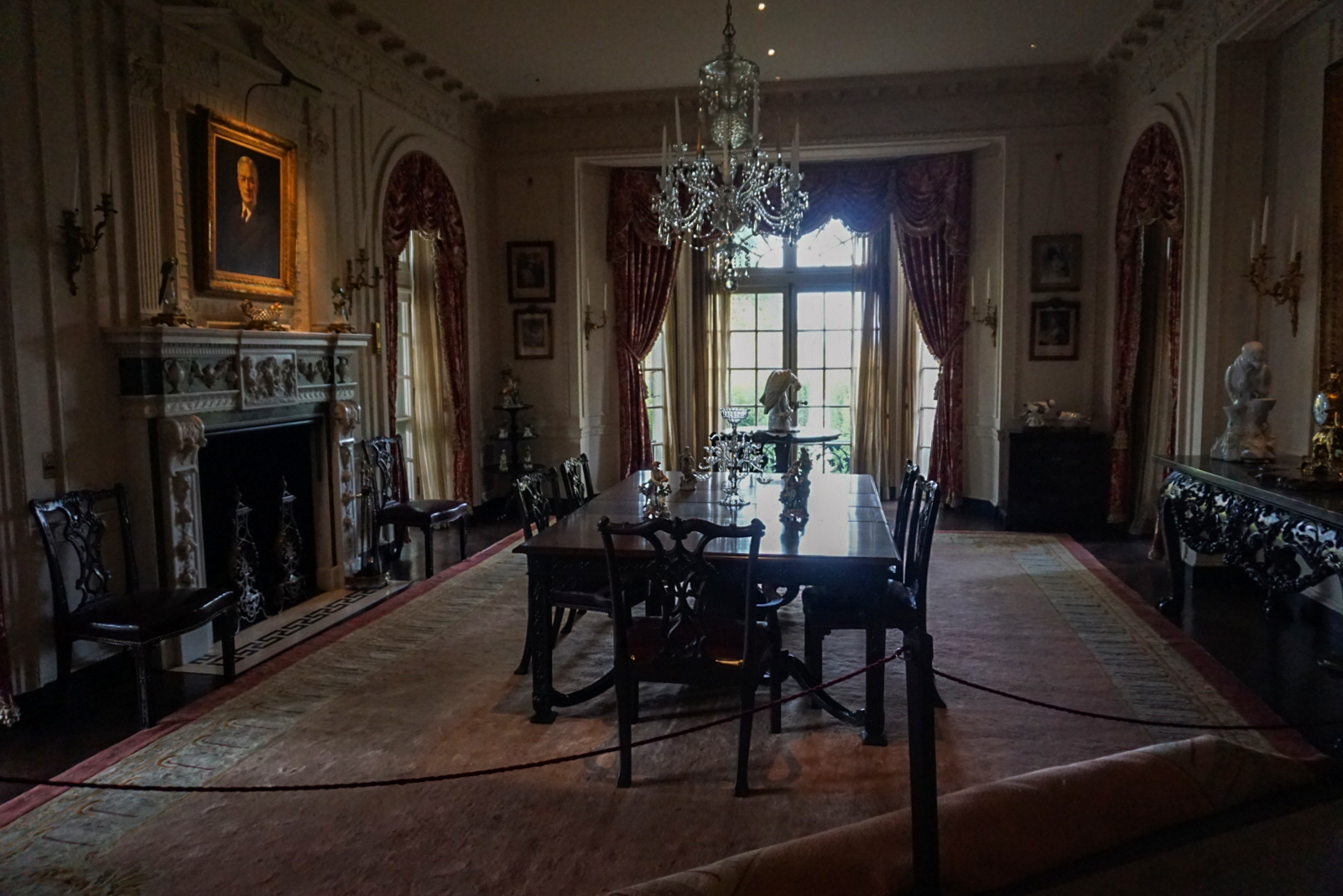
Dining room

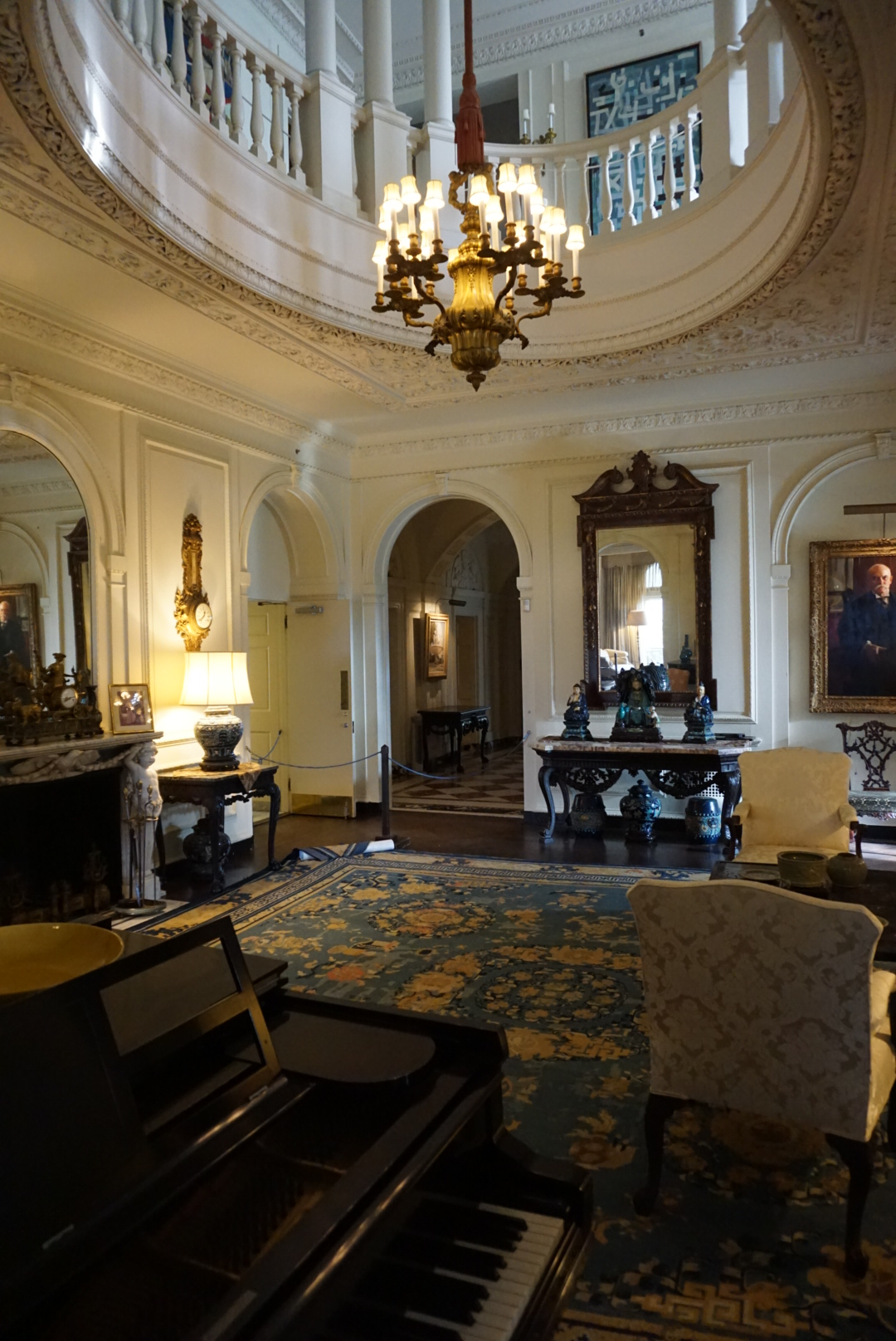
Music hall

The estate is formally called Pocantico or Pocantico Hills, but is usually referred to by the name of its mansion, Kykuit. It occupies an area of 1,380 hectares (3,410 acres). During much of the 20th century, the 1,420 hectares (3,510 acres) estate featured a resident workforce of security guards, gardeners, and laborers, and had its own farming, cattle, and food supplies. It has a nine-hole, reversible golf course, and at one time had 75 houses and 70 private roads, most designed by John D. Rockefeller Sr. and his son. A longstanding witticism about the estate quips: "It's what God would have built, if only He had the money".

In 1901, John D. Rockefeller Sr. hired golf course architect Willie Dunn, the designer of Shinnecock Hills Golf Club, to build a golf course on the grounds.

In late 1946, two of Junior's sons, John D. Rockefeller III and Laurance Rockefeller, each offered their respective residences, Fieldwood Farm and Rockwood Hall, as headquarters for the then newly formed United Nations. Family patriarch Rockefeller Junior vetoed the proposals, as the sites were too isolated from Manhattan. He instead tasked his second son, Nelson, to buy a 6.9-hectare (17-acre) site along the East River in New York City, which was subsequently donated for the construction of the UN Headquarters.

Among guests hosted by Nelson and his brother David have been American Presidents Lyndon B. Johnson, Richard M. Nixon, Gerald Ford, and Ronald Reagan, and their wives. Other notable visitors have included United Nations Secretary-General Kofi Annan, President of the Republic of South Africa Nelson Mandela, Shah of Iran Mohammad Reza Pahlavi, King Hussein of Jordan, President Anwar Sadat of Egypt, and Lord Mountbatten of Burma of the United Kingdom.

As of 2003, 10 or so Rockefeller families lived within the estate, in the central compound and beyond. Much land has been donated over the decades to New York State, including the Rockefeller State Park Preserve, and is open to the public for horseback riding, biking, and jogging.

The private Rockefeller burial ground at Kykuit abuts, but is not part of, the public Sleepy Hollow Cemetery. The plot is reserved for members of the John D. Rockefeller Jr. branch of the family. Family members and descendants of William Rockefeller Jr. are buried at Rockwood Circle in the Sleepy Hollow Cemetery.

=== Residences ===
Within the park:

- "Hawes House", home of Nelson Rockefeller
- "Kent House", home of Laurance Rockefeller

Outside the park:

- "Abeyton Lodge", home of John D. Rockefeller Jr., demolished when he occupied Kykuit after his father's death
- "Fieldwood Farm", home of John D. Rockefeller III
- "Hillcrest", originally built for Martha Baird Rockefeller, second wife of John D. Rockefeller Jr., and current location of the Rockefeller Archive Center
- "Hudson Pines", former home of David Rockefeller, just north of the Park (177 acres or 72 ha), originally built for and occupied by his only sister, Abby; sold after his death for $33 million, it is a private property; 60 acres of the estate land are under permanent protection from development through a conservation easement
- "Hunting Lodge", second home of Nelson Rockefeller
- "Rockwood Hall", originally the 1,000-acre (400 ha) property of John D. Rockefeller Sr.'s brother, William Rockefeller, and currently part of the Rockefeller State Park Preserve

=== Notable outbuildings ===
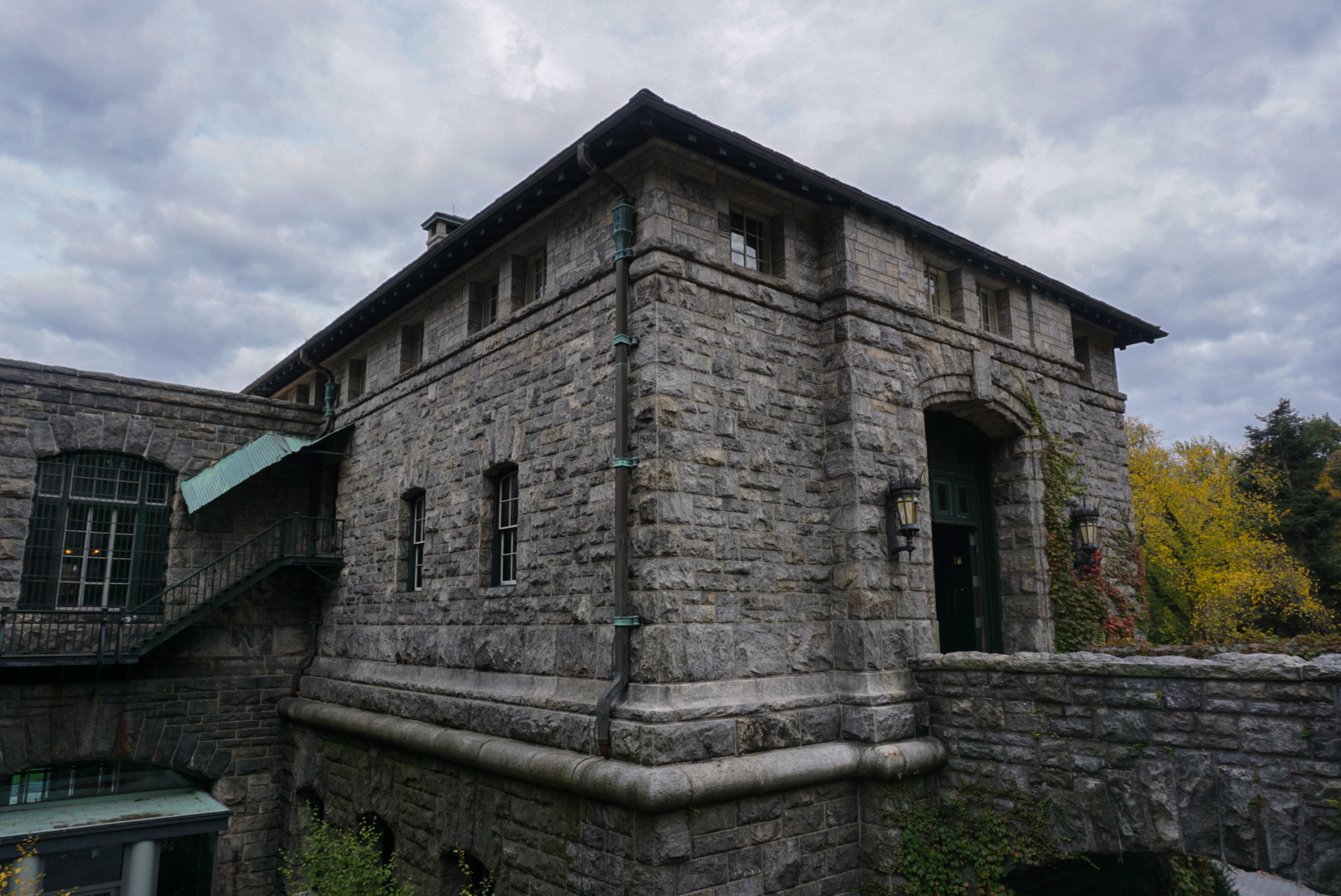
Pocantico Conference Center

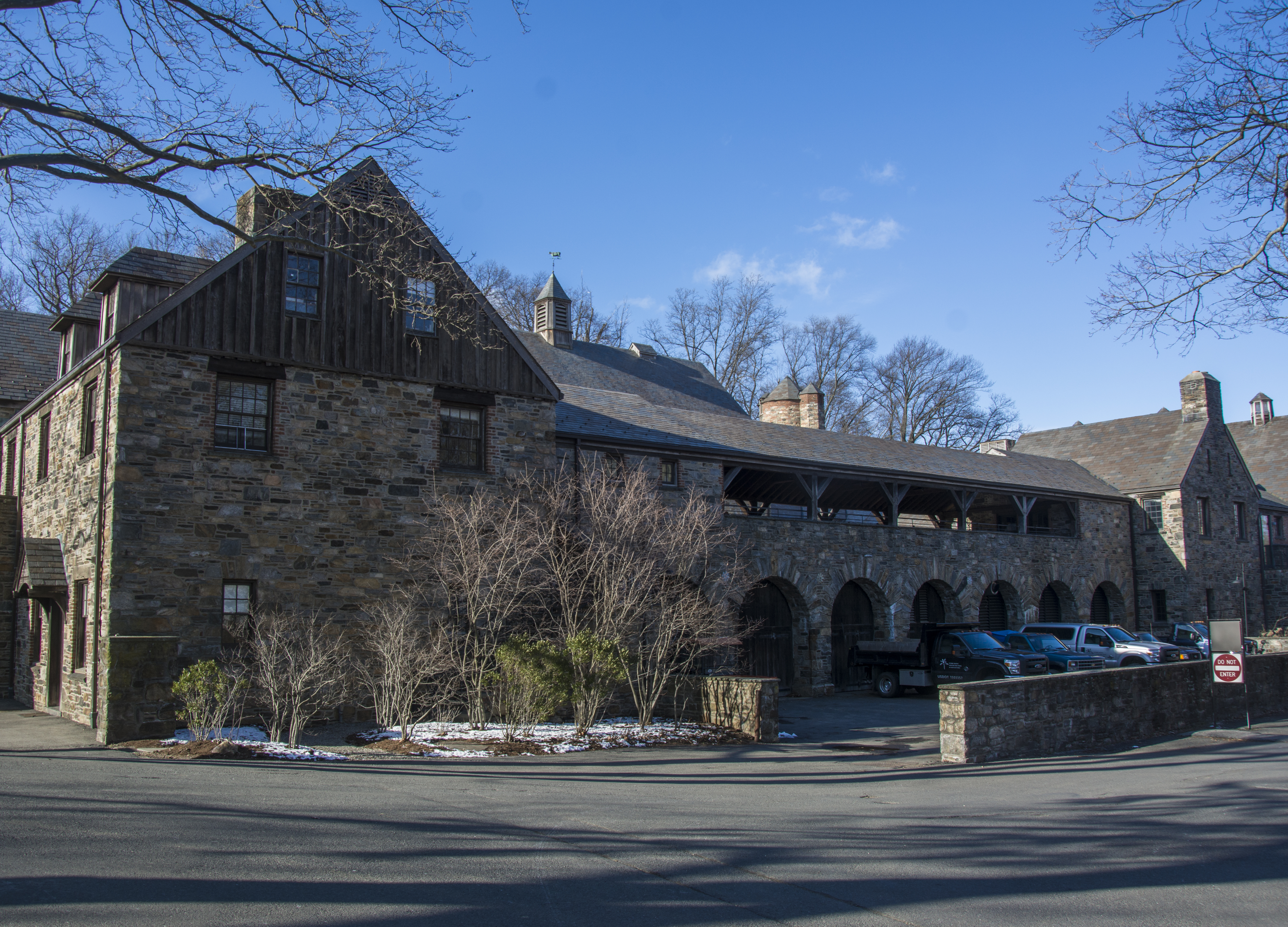
Stone Barns Center for Food & Agriculture

- The Pocantico Conference Center of the Rockefeller Brothers Fund (RBF), in the Park, where there are regular conferences.

Originally the "Coach Barn", a three-story complex ultimately redesigned and completed during 1913–14, in heavy stone from the local area, it was the first new structure built on the estate. It is three times the size of the Kykuit mansion. It still houses an impressive collection of horse-drawn carriages, and an equally noteworthy collection of 12 family-owned vintage cars for public viewing, graphically illustrating the development of automotive design from the early to the mid-twentieth century.

In 1994, with funding from David Rockefeller and brother Laurance, its lower floor was converted by the New Haven architects Herbert S. Newman and Partners into a modern, fully equipped meeting facility for the Fund's conferences, with limited overnight accommodations on the upper floor. The facilities, furthering the projects and objectives of the RBF through conferences, seminars, workshops and retreats for RBF staff, are also available to both domestic and foreign nonprofit organizations, including annual gatherings of all the major foundation presidents and UN Security Council officials, among numerous other dignitaries.

- The "Playhouse", the family seat. In the park, this is the location, since 1994, of the regular semi-annual family meetings, in June and December.

A rambling French Norman two-story structure completed by Junior during 1927, this structure is also three times the size of the Kykuit mansion. Standing alongside the nine-hole, reversible golf course, an outdoor swimming pool and two tennis courts, it contains an indoor swimming pool and tennis court, fully equipped basketball gym, squash court, billiard room and full-size bowling alley. It also has dining and living rooms, and a huge reception room resembling an English baronial hall.

- The Orangerie, housing citrus plants, this is modeled after the original at the Palace of Versailles
- The Marcel Breuer House at Pocantico, a modern house designed by Marcel Breuer and exhibited at the Museum of Modern Art as part of the "House in the Museum Garden" exhibit, then disassembled, shipped to, and reassembled at the estate.
- Underground Bomb Shelter, the location of cabinet papers and private telephone transcripts delivered to the estate during 1973 - and kept there for an unknown period of time - by the then Secretary of State, Henry Kissinger.
- The Stone Barns Center for Food & Agriculture, outside the park, was established by David Rockefeller and his daughter Peggy Dulany in 2004 in memory of Rockefeller's wife, Peggy. It is a not-for-profit agricultural and educational facility on 32 hectares (79 acres) of farmland, in the middle of the 445-hectare (1,100-acre) family-donated Rockefeller State Park Preserve, allied to the family-funded Pocantico Central School. It sells organic local produce, meat, and eggs to the nearby public for-profit restaurant, Blue Hill, as well as to local businesses in the Pocantico Hills area.

Additionally, family members have had a profound effect on the hamlet of Pocantico Hills, which is situated in the open space of the estate completely surrounded by family-owned land. The Union Church of Pocantico Hills, now owned by Historic Hudson Valley, was built by the Rockefeller family, which commissioned stained-glass windows by Matisse (an abstract rose window, memorializing Abby Aldrich) and by Chagall (the remainder of the windows, emphasizing Biblical prophets and some New Testament themes, and memorializing various members of the family and others). They also helped finance the construction of the local Pocantico Hills School.

== See also ==
- List of National Historic Landmarks in New York
- National Register of Historic Places listings in northern Westchester County, New York
