= David Rockefeller =

American banker and philanthropist (1915–2017)

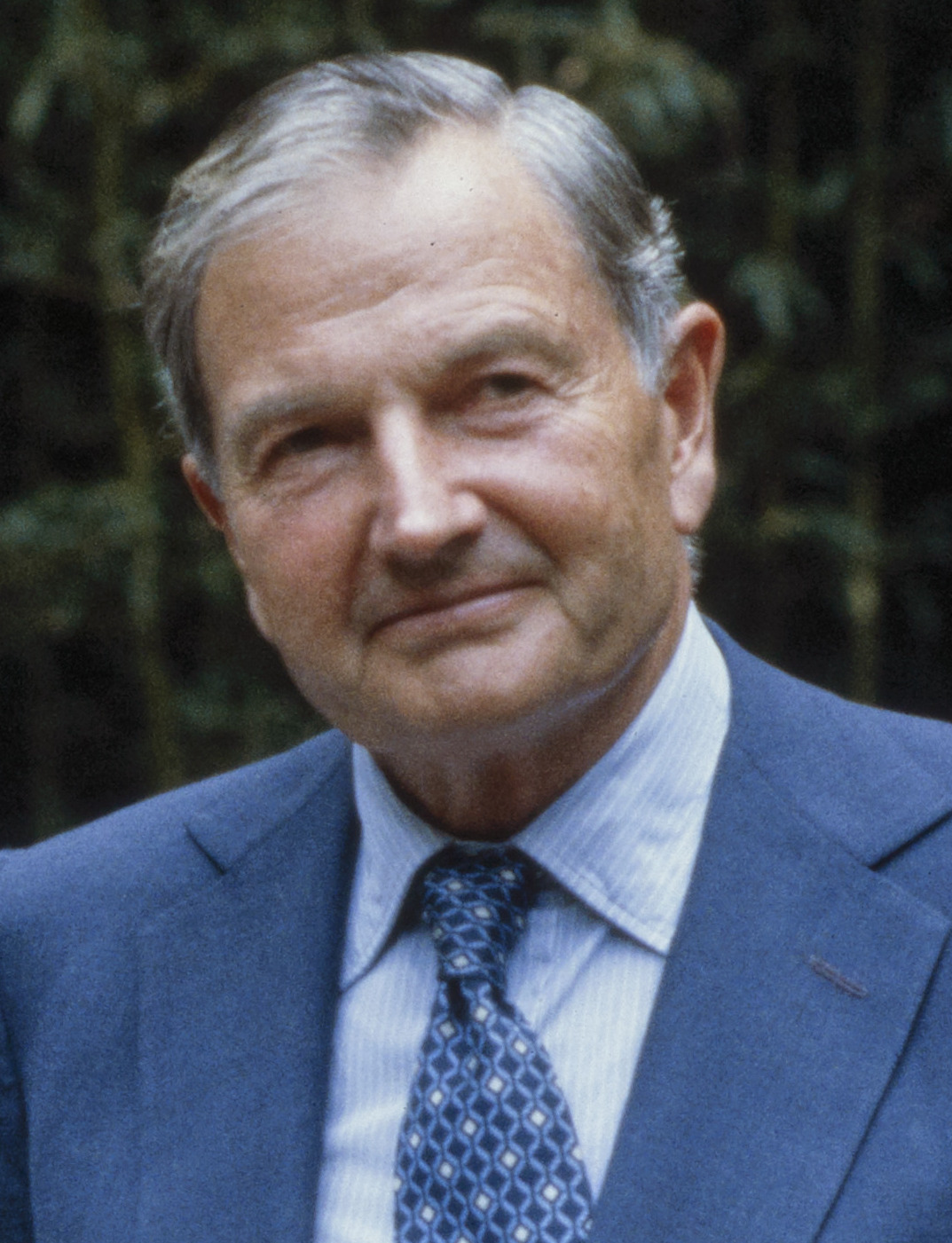
- Rockefeller in 1984

Chairman of the Council on Foreign Relations
- In office 1970–1985
- Preceded by: John J. McCloy
- Succeeded by: Peter George Peterson

Personal details
- Born: June 12, 1915 New York City, U.S.
- Died: March 20, 2017 (aged 101) Pocantico Hills, New York, U.S.
- Party: Republican
- Spouse: Margaret McGrath (m. 1940; died 1996)
- Children: David Jr.; Abigail; Neva; Margaret; Richard; Eileen
- Parents: John D. Rockefeller Jr.; Abigail Greene Aldrich
- Relatives: Rockefeller family
- Education: Harvard University (BA); London School of Economics; University of Chicago (PhD)
- Occupation: Financial executive; philanthropist; writer
- Profession: Investment banker

Military service
- Allegiance: United States
- Branch/service: United States Army
- Years of service: 1942–1945
- Rank: Captain
- Battles/wars: World War II

David Rockefeller (June 12, 1915 – March 20, 2017) was an American economist and investment banker who served as chairman and chief executive of Chase Manhattan Corporation. He was the oldest living member of the Rockefeller family from 2004 until his death in 2017. Rockefeller was the fifth son and youngest child of John D. Rockefeller Jr. and Abby Aldrich Rockefeller, and a grandson of John D. Rockefeller and Laura Spelman Rockefeller.

Rockefeller was noted for his wide-ranging political connections and foreign travel, in which he met with many foreign leaders. His fortune was estimated at $3.3 billion at the time of his death.

== Early life ==
Rockefeller was born in New York City, where he grew up in an eight-story house at 10 West 54th Street in Midtown Manhattan, the tallest private residence ever built in the city at the time. Rockefeller was the youngest of six children born to financier John Davison Rockefeller Jr. and socialite Abigail Greene "Abby" Aldrich. His father John Jr. was the only son of Standard Oil co-founder John Davison Rockefeller Sr. and schoolteacher Laura Celestia "Cettie" Spelman.

His mother Abby was a daughter of Rhode Island U.S. Senator Nelson Wilmarth Aldrich and Abigail Pearce Truman "Abby" Chapman. David's five elder siblings were Abby, John III, Nelson, Laurance, and Winthrop.

Rockefeller attended the experimental Lincoln School at 123rd Street in Harlem. The school, which was associated with Columbia University, was founded with the help of Rockefeller's educational philanthropy, the General Education Board.

=== Education ===
In 1936, Rockefeller graduated cum laude from Harvard University, where he worked as an editor on The Harvard Crimson. He also studied economics for a year at Harvard and then a year at the London School of Economics (LSE) under Friedrich von Hayek. He once dated Kathleen Cavendish, Marchioness of Hartington. During his time abroad, Rockefeller briefly worked in the London branch of what was to become the Chase Manhattan Bank.

After returning to the United States to complete his graduate studies, he received a Ph.D. in economics from the University of Chicago in 1940.

== Career ==
=== Government service ===
After completing his studies in Chicago, he became secretary to New York Mayor Fiorello La Guardia for eighteen months in a "dollar a year" public service position. Although the mayor pointed out to the press that Rockefeller was only one of 60 interns in the city government, his working space was the vacant office of the deputy mayor. From 1941 to 1942, Rockefeller was assistant regional director of the United States Office of Defense, Health and Welfare Services.

=== Military ===
Rockefeller enlisted in the United States Army and entered Officer Candidate School in 1943. He was promoted to Captain in 1945. During World War II he served in North Africa and France (he spoke fluent French) for military intelligence, setting up political and economic intelligence units. He served as a "Ritchie Boy" secret unit specially trained at Fort Ritchie, Maryland. For seven months, he served as an assistant military attaché at the American Embassy in Paris. During this period, he called on family contacts and Standard Oil executives for assistance.

=== Banking ===
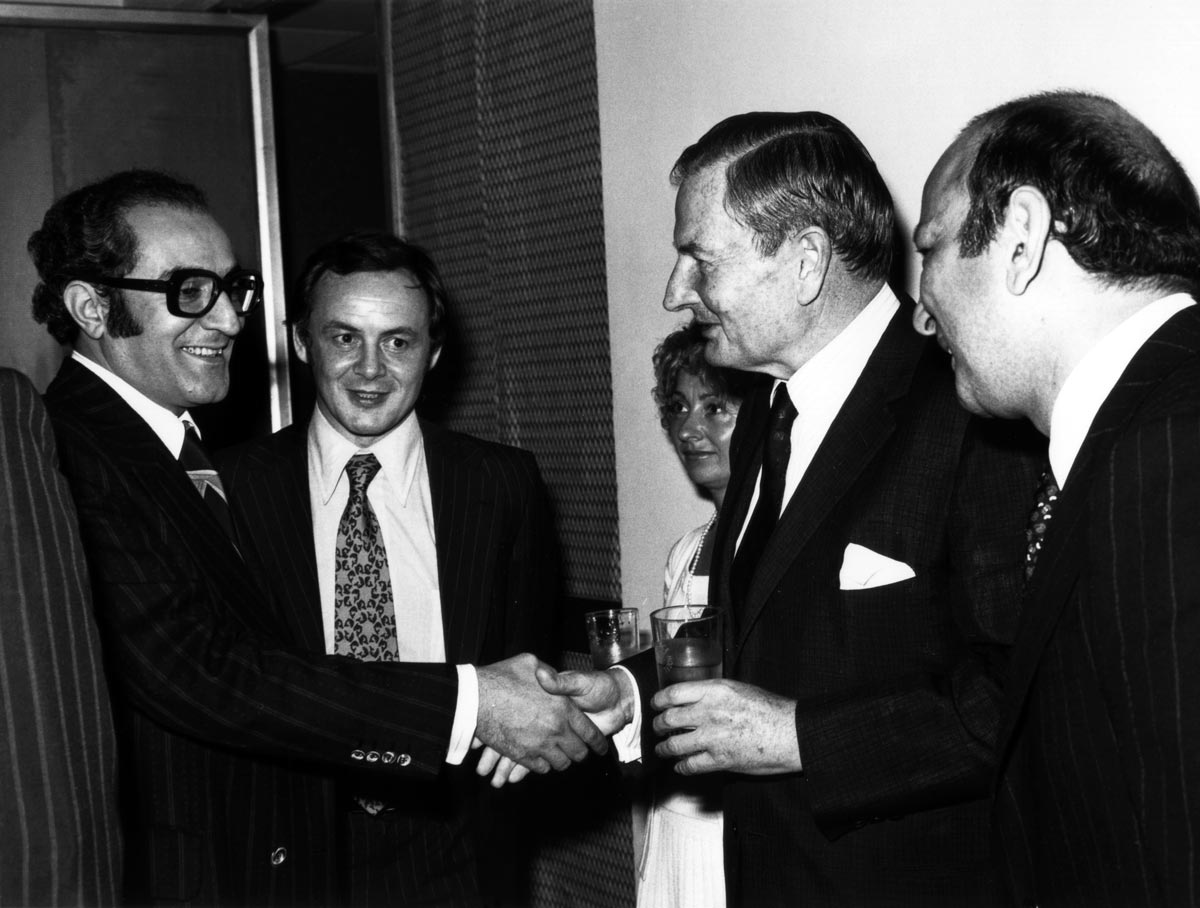
David Rockefeller meeting Iraqi financiers Jawad Hashim and Nemir Kirdar in 1979

In 1946, Rockefeller joined the staff of the longtime family-associated Chase National Bank. The chairman at that time was Rockefeller's uncle Winthrop W. Aldrich. The Chase Bank was primarily a wholesale bank, dealing with other prominent financial institutions and major corporate clients such as General Electric, which had, through its RCA affiliate, leased prominent space and become a crucial first tenant of Rockefeller Center in 1930. The bank is closely associated with and has financed the oil industry, having longstanding connections with its board of directors to the successor companies of Standard Oil, especially ExxonMobil. Chase National became the Chase Manhattan Bank in 1955 and shifted significantly into consumer banking. It is now called JPMorgan Chase.

Rockefeller started as an assistant manager in the foreign department. There he financed international trade in a number of commodities, such as coffee, sugar and metals. This position maintained relationships with more than 1,000 correspondent banks throughout the world. He served in other positions and became president in 1960. He was both the chairman and chief executive of Chase Manhattan from 1969 to 1980 and remained chairman until 1981. He was also, as recently as 1980, the single largest individual shareholder of the bank, holding 1.7% of its shares.

During his term as CEO, Chase spread internationally and became a central component of the world's financial system due to its global network of correspondent banks, the largest in the world. In 1973, Chase established the first branch of an American bank in Moscow, in the then Soviet Union. That year Rockefeller traveled to China, resulting in his bank becoming the National Bank of China's first correspondent bank in the U.S.

During this period, Chase Manhattan expanded its influence over many non-financial corporations. A 1979 study titled "The Significance of Bank Control over Large Corporations" provided an estimate for which large U.S.-based financial institutions had the most control over other corporations. The study finds that:

"The Rockefeller-controlled Chase Manhattan Bank tops the list, controlling 16 companies."

He was faulted for spending excessive amounts of time abroad, and during his tenure as CEO the bank had more troubled loans than any other major bank. Chase owned more New York City securities in the mid-1970s, when the city was nearing bankruptcy. A scandal erupted in 1974 when an audit found that losses from bond trading had been understated. In 1975 the bank was branded a "problem bank" by the Federal Reserve.

From 1974 to 1976, Chase earnings fell 36 percent while those of its biggest rivals rose 12 to 31 percent. The bank's earnings more than doubled between 1976 and 1980, far outpacing its rival Citibank in return on assets. By 1981 the bank's finances were restored to full health.

In November 1979, while chairman of the Chase Bank, Rockefeller became embroiled in an international incident when he and Henry Kissinger, along with John J. McCloy and Rockefeller aides, persuaded President Jimmy Carter through the United States Department of State to admit the Shah of Iran, Mohammad Reza Pahlavi, into the United States for hospital treatment for lymphoma. This action directly precipitated what is known as the Iran hostage crisis and placed Rockefeller under intense media scrutiny, particularly from The New York Times, for the first time in his public life.

Rockefeller retired from active management of the bank in 1981, succeeded by his protégé Willard C. Butcher. Former Chase chairman John J. McCloy said at the time that he believed Rockefeller would not go down in history as a great banker but rather as a "real personality, as a distinguished and loyal member of the community".

== Political connections ==
Rockefeller traveled widely and met with both foreign rulers and U.S. presidents, beginning with Dwight D. Eisenhower. At times he served as an unofficial emissary on high-level business. Among the foreign leaders he met were Saddam Hussein, Fidel Castro, Nikita Khrushchev, and Mikhail Gorbachev.

In 1968, he declined an offer from his brother Nelson Rockefeller, then governor of New York, to appoint him to Robert F. Kennedy's Senate seat after Kennedy was assassinated in June 1968, a post Nelson also offered to their nephew John Davison "Jay" Rockefeller IV. President Jimmy Carter offered him the position of United States Secretary of the Treasury but he declined.

Rockefeller was criticized for befriending foreign autocrats in order to expand Chase interests in their countries. The New York Times columnist David Brooks wrote in 2002 that Rockefeller "spent his life in the club of the ruling class and was loyal to members of the club, no matter what they did." He noted that Rockefeller had cut profitable deals with "oil-rich dictators", "Soviet party bosses" and "Chinese perpetrators of the Cultural Revolution".

Rockefeller met Henry Kissinger in 1954, when Kissinger was appointed a director of a seminal Council on Foreign Relations study group on nuclear weapons, of which David Rockefeller was a member. He named Kissinger to the board of trustees of the Rockefeller Brothers Fund, and consulted with him frequently, with the subjects including the Chase Bank's interests in Chile and the possibility of the election of Salvador Allende in 1970. Rockefeller supported his "opening of China" initiative in 1971 as it afforded banking opportunities for the Chase Bank.

Though a lifelong Republican and party contributor, he was a member of the moderate "Rockefeller Republicans" that arose out of the political ambitions and public policy stance of his brother Nelson. In 2006, he teamed up with former Goldman Sachs executives and others to form a fund-raising group based in Washington, Republicans Who Care, that supported moderate Republican candidates over more hardline contenders.

=== Central Intelligence Agency ties ===
Rockefeller was acquainted with Central Intelligence Agency (CIA) director Allen Dulles and his brother, Eisenhower administration Secretary of State John Foster Dulles—who was an in-law of the family—since his college years. It was in Rockefeller Center that Allen Dulles had set up his WWII operational center after Pearl Harbor, liaising closely with MI6, which also had their principal U.S. operation in the center. He also knew and associated with the former CIA director Richard Helms as well as Archibald Bulloch Roosevelt Jr., a Chase Bank employee and former CIA agent whose first cousin, CIA agent Kermit Roosevelt Jr., was involved in the Iran coup of 1953.

In 1953, he had befriended William Bundy, a pivotal CIA analyst for nine years in the 1950s, who became the Agency liaison to the National Security Council, and a subsequent lifelong friend. In Cary Reich's biography of his brother Nelson, a former CIA agent states that David was extensively briefed on covert intelligence operations by himself and other Agency division chiefs, under the direction of David's "friend and confidant", CIA director Allen Dulles.

== Policy groups ==
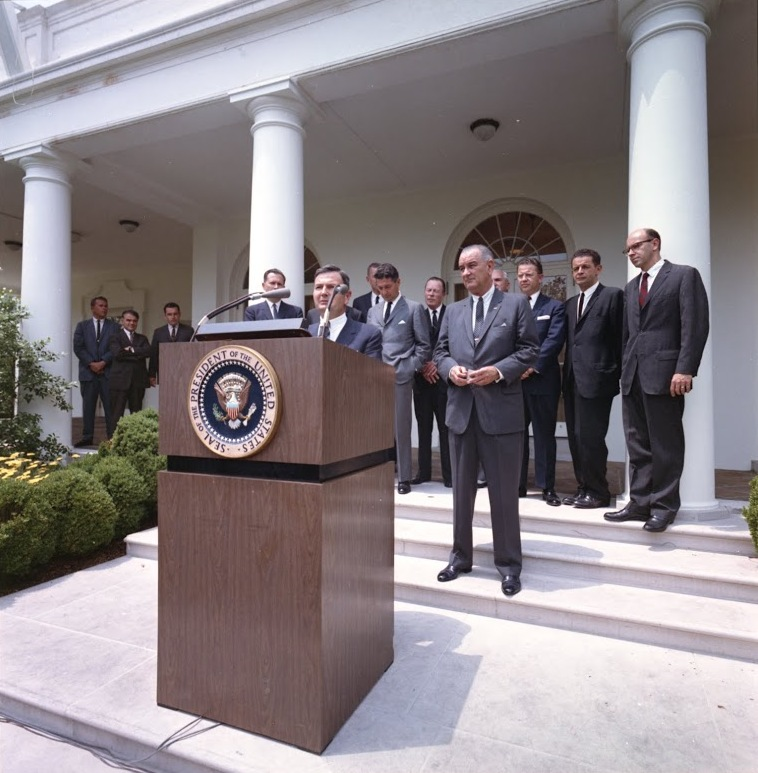
David Rockefeller launches the International Executive Service Corps in the White House Rose Garden, 1964.

In 1964, along with other American business figures such as Sol Linowitz, Rockefeller founded the non-profit International Executive Service Corps, which encourages developing nations to promote private enterprise. In 1979, he formed the Partnership for New York City, a not-for-profit membership organization of New York businessmen. In 1992, he was selected as a leading member of the Russian-American Bankers Forum, an advisory group set up by the head of the Federal Reserve Bank of New York to advise Russia on the modernization of its banking system, with the full endorsement of President Boris Yeltsin.

Rockefeller had a lifelong association with the Council on Foreign Relations (CFR) when he joined as a director in 1949. In 1965, Rockefeller and other businessmen formed the Council of the Americas to stimulate and support economic integration in the Americas. In 1992, at a Council sponsored forum, Rockefeller proposed a "Western Hemisphere free trade area", which became the Free Trade Area of the Americas in a Miami summit in 1994. His and the council's chief liaison to President Bill Clinton in order to garner support for this initiative was through Clinton's chief of staff, Mack McLarty, whose consultancy firm Kissinger McLarty Associates is a corporate member of the council, while McLarty himself is on the board of directors. He was a trustee of the Carnegie Endowment for International Peace, including in 1948, when Alger Hiss was president.

Displeased with the refusal of Bilderberg Group meetings to include Japan, Rockefeller helped found the Trilateral Commission in July 1973.

== Later career ==
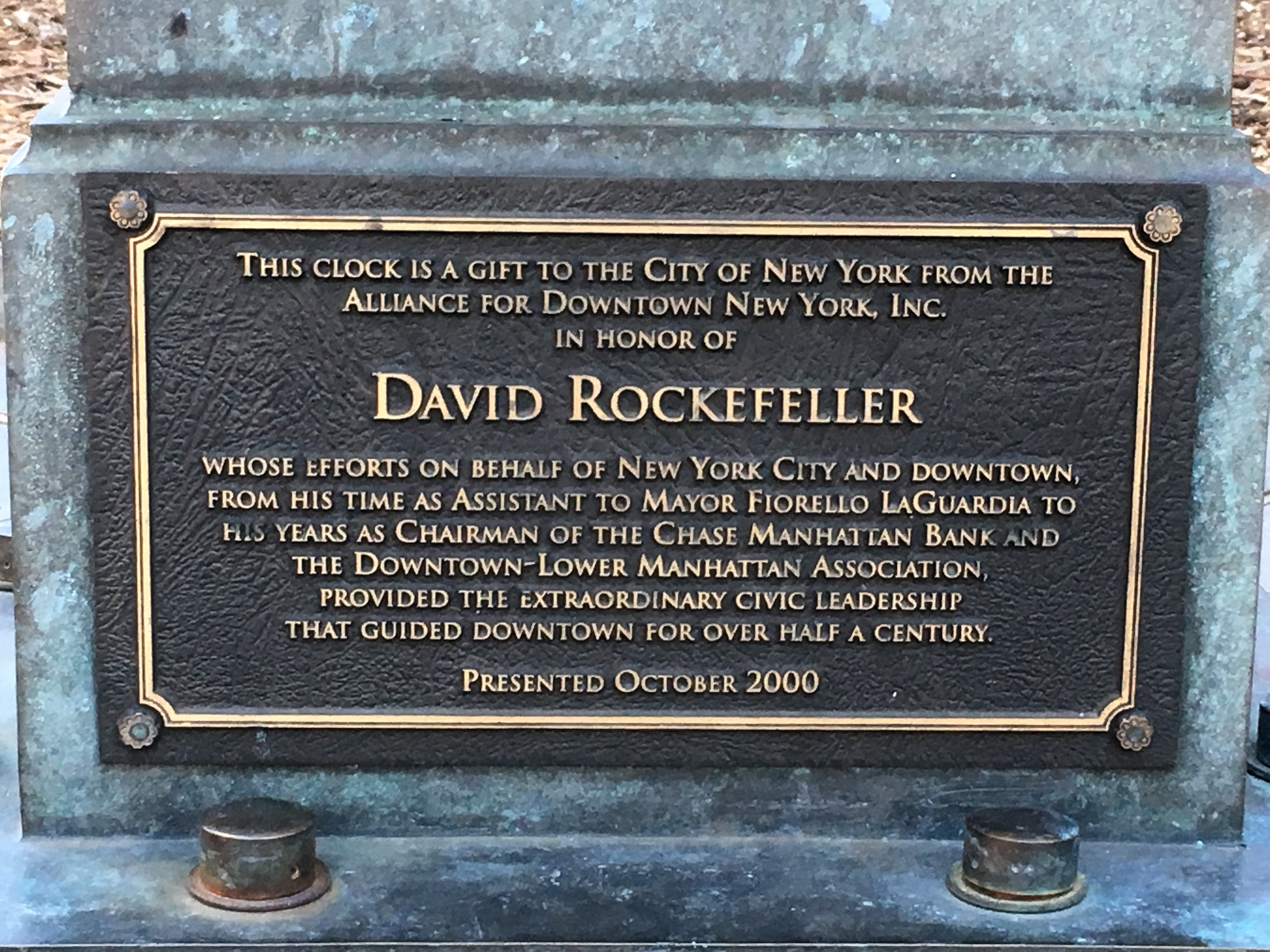
A plaque honoring David Rockefeller's work on behalf of New York City

After the war and alongside his work at Chase, Rockefeller took a more active role in his family's business dealings. Working with his brothers in the two floors of Rockefeller Center known as Room 5600, he reorganized the family's myriad business and philanthropic ventures. The men kept regular "brothers' meetings" where they made decisions on matters of common interest and reported on noteworthy events in each of their lives. Rockefeller served as secretary to the group, making notes of each meeting. The notes are now in the family archive and will be released in the future. Following the deaths of his brothers, Winthrop (1973), John III (1978), Nelson (1979), and Laurance (2004), David became sole head of the family (with the important involvement of his elder son, David Jr.).

Rockefeller ensured that selected members of the fourth generation, known generically as the cousins, became directly involved in the family's institutions. This involved inviting them to be more active in the Rockefeller Brothers Fund, the principal foundation established in 1940 by the five brothers and their one sister. The extended family also became involved in their own philanthropic organization, formed in 1967 and primarily established by third-generation members, called the Rockefeller Family Fund.

In the 1980s, Rockefeller became embroiled in controversy over the mortgaging and sale of Rockefeller Center to Japanese interests. In 1985, the Rockefeller family mortgaged the property for $1.3 billion, with $300 million of that going to the family. In 1989, 51 percent of the property, later increased to 80 percent, was sold to Mitsubishi Estate Company of Japan. This action was criticized for surrendering a major U.S. landmark to foreign interests. In 2000, Rockefeller presided over the final sale of Rockefeller Center to Tishman Speyer Properties, along with the Crown family of Chicago, which ended the more than 70 years of direct family financial association with Rockefeller Center.

He published Memoirs in 2002, the only time a member of the Rockefeller family has written an autobiography.

In 2004, with his daughter Peggy Dulany, he established the Stone Barns Center for Food & Agriculture, a non-profit farm, education, and research center, with a high-end farm-to-table restaurant. It is located in Pocantico Hills, New York, on the land which was once part of the family estate and later, of the Rockefeller State Park Preserve. In the 1970s, his wife, Margaret "Peggy" McGrath Rockefeller, had a successful cattle breeding operation there, and the center was established as a memorial for Peggy Rockefeller, who died in 1996. David's move to carve off a segment of the already donated land for a personal, albeit charitable, project caused disagreement on the part of other Rockefeller family members, as it ran contrary to the family's conservation policy. Inclusion of a commercial entity, a restaurant, was an additional point of internal friction. David, the patriarch of the family, prevailed. Ultimately, the positive public image of the Stone Barns Center as an international beacon for sustainable agriculture and culinary innovation secured it as a successful part of the Rockefeller legacy.

In 2005, he gave $100 million to the Museum of Modern Art and $100 million to Rockefeller University, two of the most prominent family institutions; as well as $10 million to Harvard and $5 million to Colonial Williamsburg. In 2006, he pledged $225 million to the Rockefeller Brothers Fund upon his death, the largest gift in the Fund's history. The money will be used to create the David Rockefeller Global Development Fund, to support projects that improve access to health care, conduct research on international finance and trade, fight poverty, and support sustainable development, as well as to a program that fosters dialogue between Muslim and Western nations. Rockefeller donated $100 million to Harvard University in 2008. The New York Times estimated in November 2006 that his total charitable donations amount to $900 million over his lifetime, a figure that was substantiated by a monograph on the family's overall benefactions, entitled The Chronicle of Philanthropy.

Rockefeller was a noted internationalist.

Rockefeller's will requires his estate, once assets are liquidated, to donate over $700 million to various non-profits, including Rockefeller University, the Museum of Modern Art and Harvard. The largest donation will be either $250 million or the remaining balance of the estate that will fund the launch of the David Rockefeller Global Development Fund.

== Internationalist conspiracy ==
Throughout his life, Rockefeller was accused of being part of an internationalist conspiracy seeking to undermine the interests of the United States and promote a more unified global order. One of Rockefeller's most prominent accusers was Georgia Congressman Larry McDonald, who in the 1975 book, The Rockefeller File, wrote:

The Rockefellers and their allies have, for at least fifty years, been carefully following a plan to use their economic power to gain political control of first America, and then the rest of the world. Do I mean conspiracy? Yes, I do. I am convinced there is such a plot, international in scope, generations old in planning, and incredibly evil in intent.

In response to accusations of this type, David Rockefeller himself wrote in his 2003 book, Memoirs:

For more than a century ideological extremists at either end of the political spectrum have seized upon well-publicized incidents such as my encounter with Castro to attack the Rockefeller family for the inordinate influence they claim we wield over American political and economic institutions. Some even believe we are part of a secret cabal working against the best interests of the United States, characterizing my family and me as 'internationalists' and of conspiring with others around the world to build a more integrated global political and economic structure--one world, if you will. If that's the charge, I stand guilty, and I am proud of it.

== Personal life ==
In 1940, Rockefeller married Margaret "Peggy" McGrath, who died in 1996. They had six children:

1. David Rockefeller Jr. (born July 24, 1941) – vice chairman, Rockefeller Family & Associates (the family office, Room 5600); chairman of Rockefeller Financial Services; Trustee of the Rockefeller Foundation; former chairman of the Rockefeller Brothers Fund and Rockefeller & Co., Inc., among many other family institutions.
2. Abigail Aldrich "Abby" Rockefeller (born 1943) – ecologist and feminist. Eldest and most rebellious daughter, she was drawn to Marxism and was an ardent admirer of Fidel Castro and a late 1960s/early 1970s radical feminist who belonged to the organization Female Liberation, later forming a splinter group called Cell 16. An environmentalist and ecologist, she has been an active supporter of the women's liberation movement.
3. Neva Rockefeller (born 1944) – economist. She is director of the Global Development and Environment Institute; trustee and vice chair of the Rockefeller Brothers Fund.
4. Margaret Dulany "Peggy" Rockefeller (born 1947) – founder of the Synergos Institute in 1986; board member of the Council on Foreign Relations; serves on the advisory committee of the David Rockefeller Center for Latin American Studies at Harvard University.
5. Richard Gilder Rockefeller (1949–2014) – physician; chairman of the United States advisory board of the international aid group Doctors Without Borders; trustee and chair of the Rockefeller Brothers Fund.
6. Eileen Rockefeller (born February 26, 1952) – Founding Chair of Rockefeller Philanthropy Advisors, established in New York City in 2002.

=== Death ===
Rockefeller died in his sleep from congestive heart failure on March 20, 2017, at his home in Pocantico Hills, New York. He was 101 years old.

== Wealth ==
At the time of his death, Forbes estimated Rockefeller's net worth was $3.3 billion. Initially, most of his wealth had come to him via the family trusts created by his father, which were administered by Room 5600 and Chase Bank. In turn, most of these trusts were held as shares in the successor companies of Standard Oil, as well as diverse real estate investment partnerships, such as the expansive Embarcadero Center in San Francisco, which he later sold for considerable profit, retaining only an indirect stake. In addition, he was or had been a partner in various properties such as Caneel Bay, a 4,000-acre (16 km^{2}) resort development in the Virgin Islands; a cattle ranch in Argentina; and a 15,500-acre (63 km^{2}) sheep ranch in Australia.

Another major source of asset wealth was his art collection, ranging from impressionist to postmodern, which he developed through the influence upon him of his mother Abby and her establishment, with two associates, of the Museum of Modern Art in New York City in 1929. The collection, valued at several hundred million dollars, was auctioned in the spring of 2018, with proceeds going to several designated nonprofit organizations, including Rockefeller University, Harvard University, the Museum of Modern Art, the Council on Foreign Relations, and the Maine Coast Heritage Trust.

== Residences ==
Rockefeller's principal residence was at "Hudson Pines", on the Kykuit family estate in Pocantico Hills, New York. He had a Manhattan residence at 146 East 65th Street, as well as a country residence (known as "Four Winds") at a farm in Livingston, New York (Columbia County), where his wife raised Simmenthal beef cattle.

He maintained a summer home, "Ringing Point", at Seal Harbor on Mount Desert Island off the Maine coast. In May 2015, he donated one thousand acres of land in Seal Harbor to the Mount Desert Land and Garden Preserve.

The Kykuit section of the Rockefeller family compound is the location of The Pocantico Conference Center of the Rockefeller Brothers Fund – established by David and his four brothers in 1940 – which was created when the Fund leased the area from the National Trust for Historic Preservation in 1991.

=== Saint Barthélemy ===
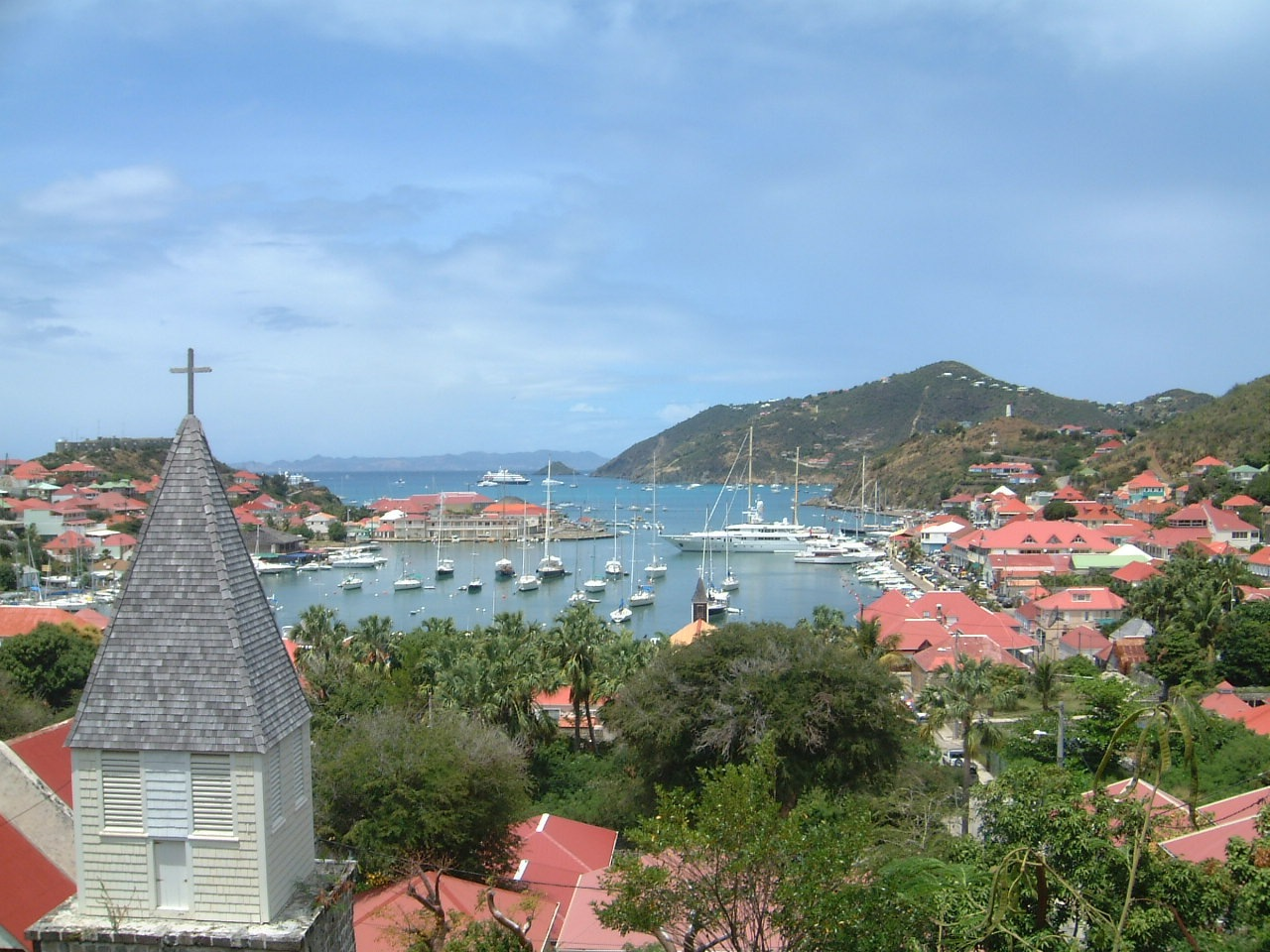
Gustavia in Saint Barthélemy

Rockefeller owned a large estate on the French island of Saint Barthélemy. Along with the Rothschild family, he was one of the earliest developers and tourists on the island in the 1950s. The home was very modern and was located in the Colombier district, known to many as the most beautiful section of the island. The estate has changed hands several times over the years and is the single largest private parcel on the island, encompassing the entire Baie de Colombier. Many years ago, the Rockefeller family donated the land in the initial creation of the Saint Barth Zone Verte, or Green Zone, which is an area which cannot be developed.

The property includes a private dock in the port of Gustavia, as there were no roads to the property and the only way to get there was by boat. Rockefeller would moor his yacht at his private dock in Gustavia before transferring to the Colombier estate in a smaller boat, as the bay could not accommodate his yacht. The property was recently listed for over $100 million, but it is not currently used as a residence. The main house has fallen into disrepair. It was sold for $136 million in 2023.

== Non-governmental leadership positions ==
- Council on Foreign Relations – Honorary Chairman
- Americas Society – Founder and Honorary Chairman
- Trilateral Commission – Founder and Honorary North American Chairman
- Bilderberg Meetings – Only member of the Member Advisory Group
- New York Young Republican Club – Board Member

== Awards and honors ==
- Presidential Medal of Freedom (1998);
- U.S. Legion of Merit (1945);
- French Legion of Honor (1945);
- U.S. Army Commendation Ribbon (1945);
- Commander of the Brazilian Order of the Southern Cross (1956);
- Elected to the American Philosophical Society (1959)
- Charles Evans Hughes award NCCJ, (1974);
- Elected to the American Academy of Arts and Sciences (1991)
- George C. Marshall Foundation Award (1999);
- Andrew Carnegie Medal of Philanthropy (2001);
- Synergos Bridging Leadership Award (2003);
- The Grand Croix of the Légion d'honneur (2000);
- C. Walter Nichols Award, New York University (1970);
- World Brotherhood Award, Jewish Theological Seminary of America (1953);
- Award of Merit from the American Institute of Architects (1965);
- Medal of Honor for City Planning, American Institute of Architects (1968);
- World Monuments Fund's Hadrian Award (for preservation of art and architecture) (1994);
- National Institute of Social Sciences Gold Medal Award (1967 – awarded to all 5 brothers);
- United States Council for International Business (USCIB) International Leadership Award (1983);
- The Hundred Year Association of New York's Gold Medal Award (1965).
