= Stone Barns Center for Food & Agriculture =

Agriculture and educational organization in New York

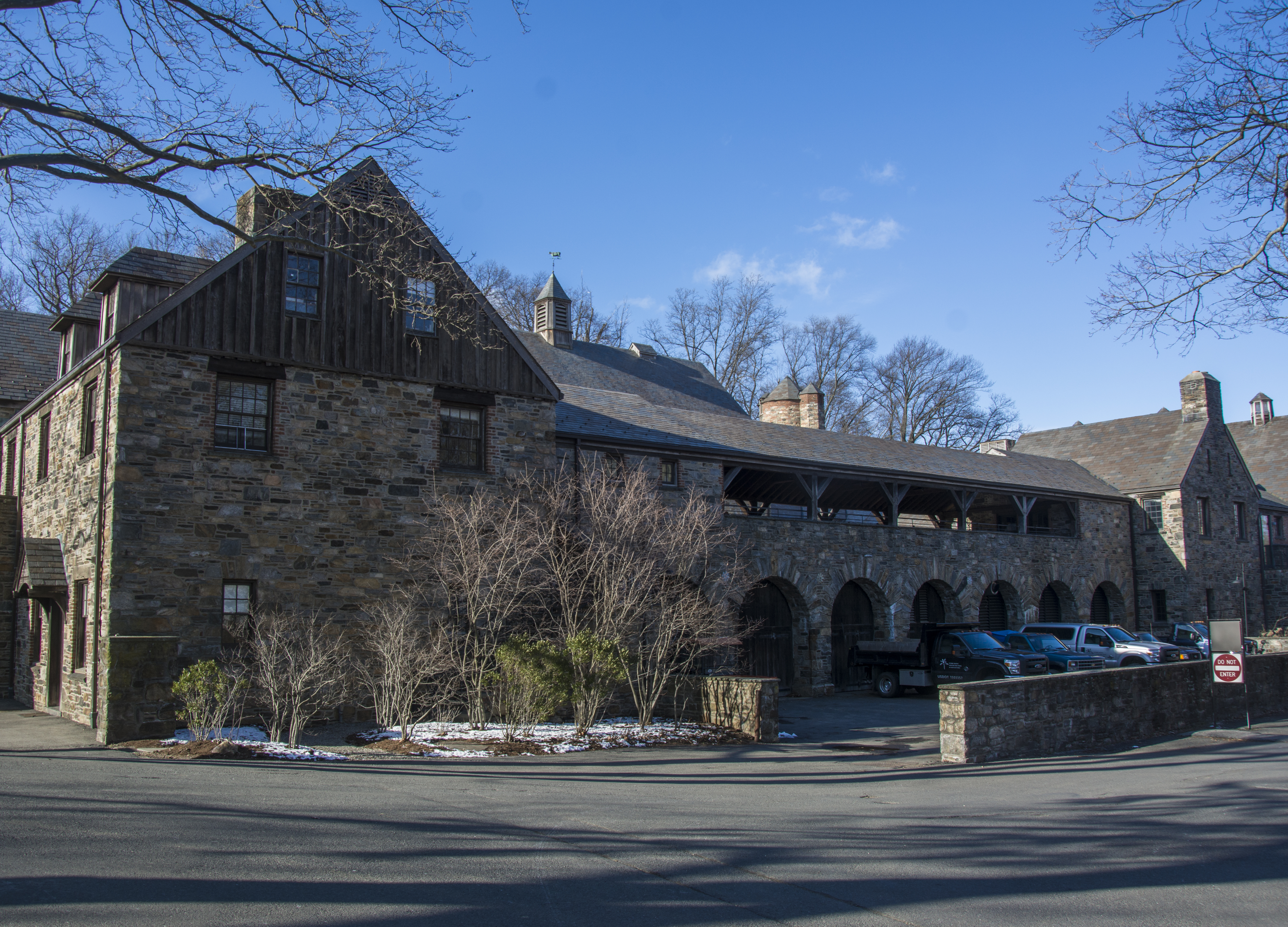
- Main building
- Interactive map of Stone Barns Center for Food & Agriculture
- Town/City: Pocantico Hills, New York
- Coordinates: 41.1039°N 73.828844°W
- Established: 2004
- Area: 80 acres (320,000 m^{2})
- Produces: Heirloom crops and heritage breeds of livestock
- Website: www.stonebarnscenter.org

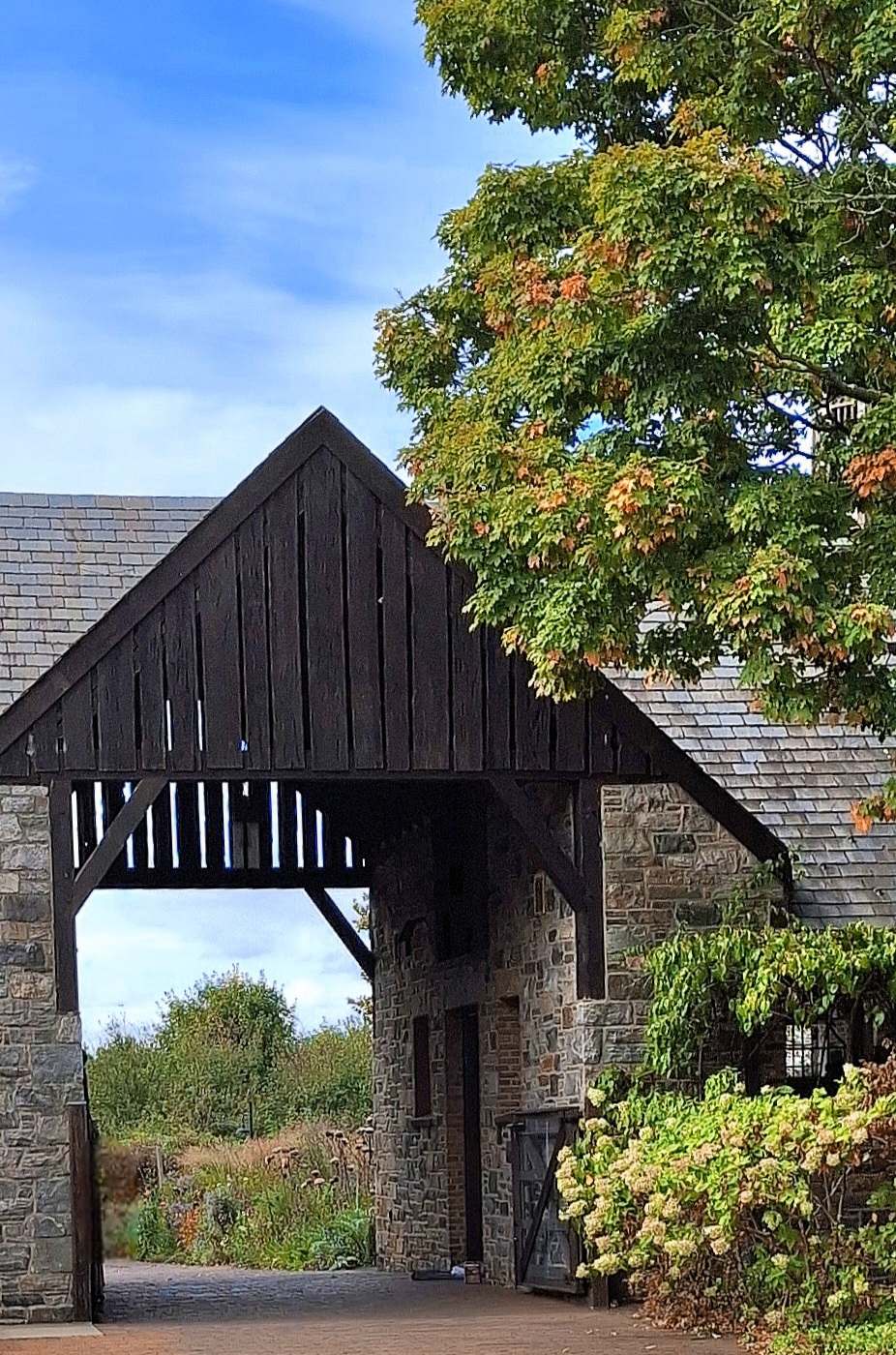
Entrance to the central courtyard

Stone Barns Center for Food & Agriculture is a non-profit farm as well as an agricultural education and research center located in Pocantico Hills, New York. The center was created on 80 acres (320,000 m^{2}) formerly belonging to Pocantico, the Rockefeller estate. It is surrounded on three sides by the Rockefeller State Park Preserve. Stone Barns promotes sustainable agriculture, local food, and community-supported agriculture. It is a four-season operation.

Stone Barns Center is also home to the Barber family's Blue Hill at Stone Barns, a restaurant that serves contemporary cuisine using local ingredients, with an emphasis on produce from the center's farm. Blue Hill staff also participate in the center's education programs.

== History ==
Stone Barns' property was once part of Pocantico, the Rockefeller estate. The Norman-style stone barns were commissioned by John D. Rockefeller Jr. to be a dairy farm in the 1930s. The complex fell into disuse during the 1950s and was mainly used for storage. In the 1970s, agricultural activity resumed when David Rockefeller's wife Margaret "Peggy" McGrath Rockefeller began a successful cattle breeding operation.

Stone Barns Center for Food and Agriculture was created by David Rockefeller and his daughter Peggy Dulany as a memorial for Peggy Rockefeller, who died in 1996. David's move to carve off a segment of the already donated land for a personal, albeit charitable, project caused disagreement on the part of other Rockefeller family members, as it ran contrary to the family's conservation policy. Inclusion of a commercial entity, a restaurant, was an additional point of internal friction. David, the patriarch of the family, prevailed, and Stone Barns opened to the public in May 2004 after a thorough master plan renovation by Machado Silvetti. Ultimately, the positive public image of the Stone Barns Center as an international beacon for sustainable agriculture and culinary innovation secured it as a successful part of the Rockefeller legacy.

In 2008, Stone Barns opened its slaughterhouse to slaughter its livestock for plating at Blue Hill. Using their own slaughterhouse also eliminated the long and expensive drives to the closest one.

In 2017, Stone Barns published Letters to a Young Farmer, a compilation of essays and letters about the highs and lows of farming life, including Barbara Kingsolver, Bill McKibben, Michael Pollan, Temple Grandin, Wendell Berry, Rick Bayless, and Marion Nestle.

== Farm ==
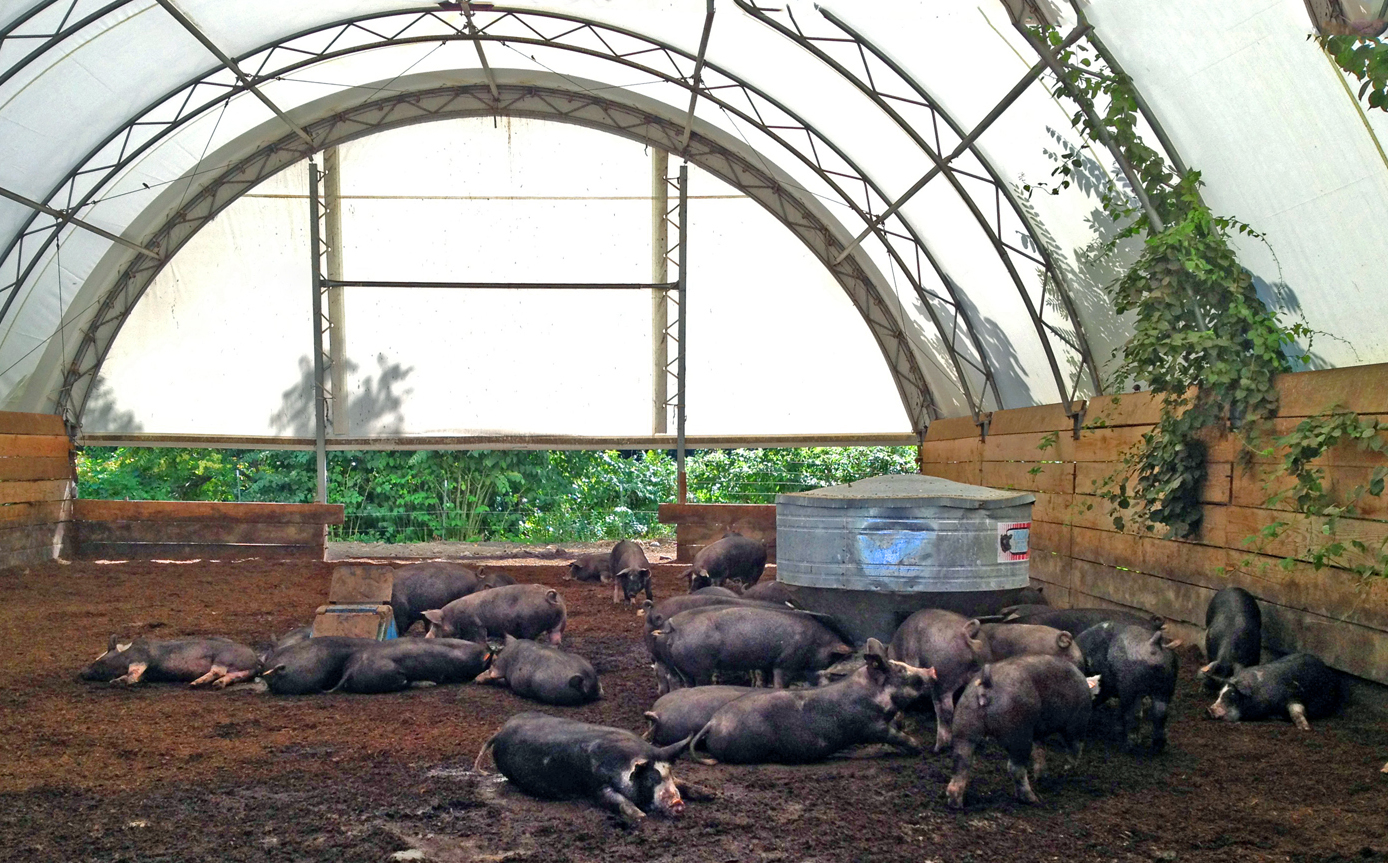
Pigpen at Stone Barns

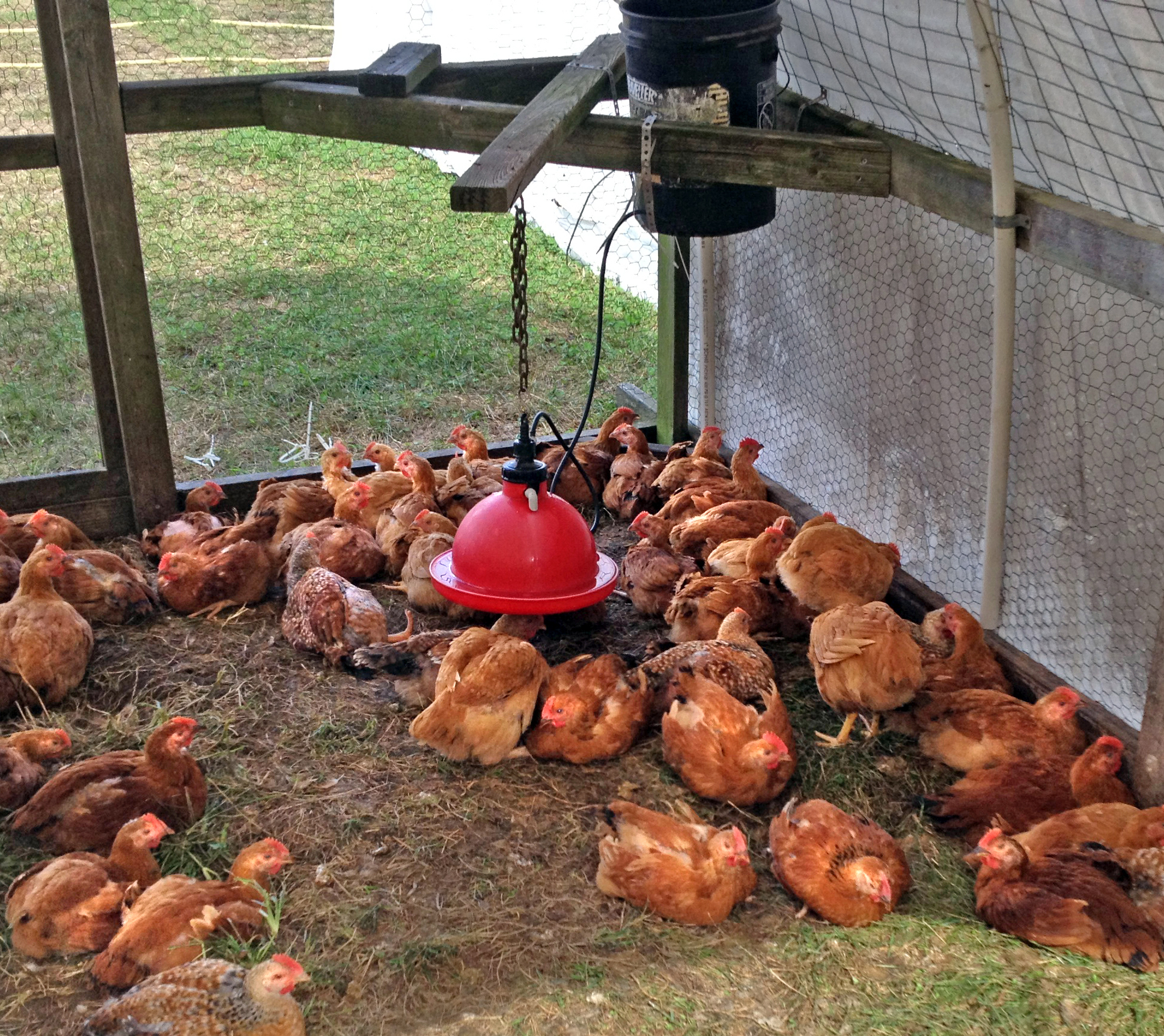
Chicken coop at Stone Barns

The farm at Stone Barns is a four-season operation with approximately 6 acres (24,000 m^{2}) used for vegetable production. It uses a seven-year rotation schedule in the field and greenhouse beds. The farm grows 300 varieties of produce year-round, both in the outdoor fields and gardens and in the 22,000-square-foot (2,000 m^{2}) minimally heated greenhouse that capitalizes on each season's available sunlight. Among the crops suitable for the local soil and climate are rare varieties such as celtuce, Kai-lan, hakurei turnips, New England Eight-Row Flint seed corn, and finale fennel. The farm uses no pesticides, herbicides or chemical additives, although compost is added to the soil for enrichment. The farm has a six-month composting cycle using manure, hay, and food waste scraps.

=== Livestock ===
Stone Barns raises cattle, chickens, sheep, pigs, goats and bees suited to the local ecosystem. The livestock farmers try to raise animals in a manner consistent with the animals' evolutionary instincts. The cattle, chickens, sheep and goats are raised on pastures kept healthy and productive through carefully managed rotational grazing. The sheep and pigs' bedding packs are regularly turned and composted. Farmers who raise animals in this fashion are frequently called "grass farmers" because there is so much emphasis on the health of the pastures. Strategies for maintaining the pastures include intensive paddock management so the grazed area has ample time to recover and provide a natural refuge for birds and other wildlife, essential for the maintenance of ecological balance.

In 2018, Stone Barns began managing 300+ acres of the Rockefeller State Park Preserve. The first season saw a multi-species intensive grazing program where pigs forage and consume food waste including spent grain from the Captain Lawrence brewery in Elmsford, New York. Cattle, sheep, goats, hens and ducks also graze the preserve's land.

== Programs ==
Stone Barns offers a variety of programs for farmers, teachers and the public. Annually, the farm engages eight livestock and crops apprentices. The hands on training also includes courses on business, pollination, water and soil.

=== Young Farmers Conference ===
In 2008, Stone Barns held the first Young Farms Conference to provide inspiration and education for beginning farmers. With at least 30 percent of American farmers over 65 and only 6 percent under 35 and usually unable to purchase land, the conference aims to address farming on a smaller scale and training workshops.

=== Farm and garden workshops ===
Hands-on classes for all experience levels — amateur gardeners, community garden leaders and members, regional farmers, industry professionals, and anyone interested in regenerative agriculture. Students receive firsthand training from the crops and livestock farmers.

== Blue Hill at Stone Barns ==
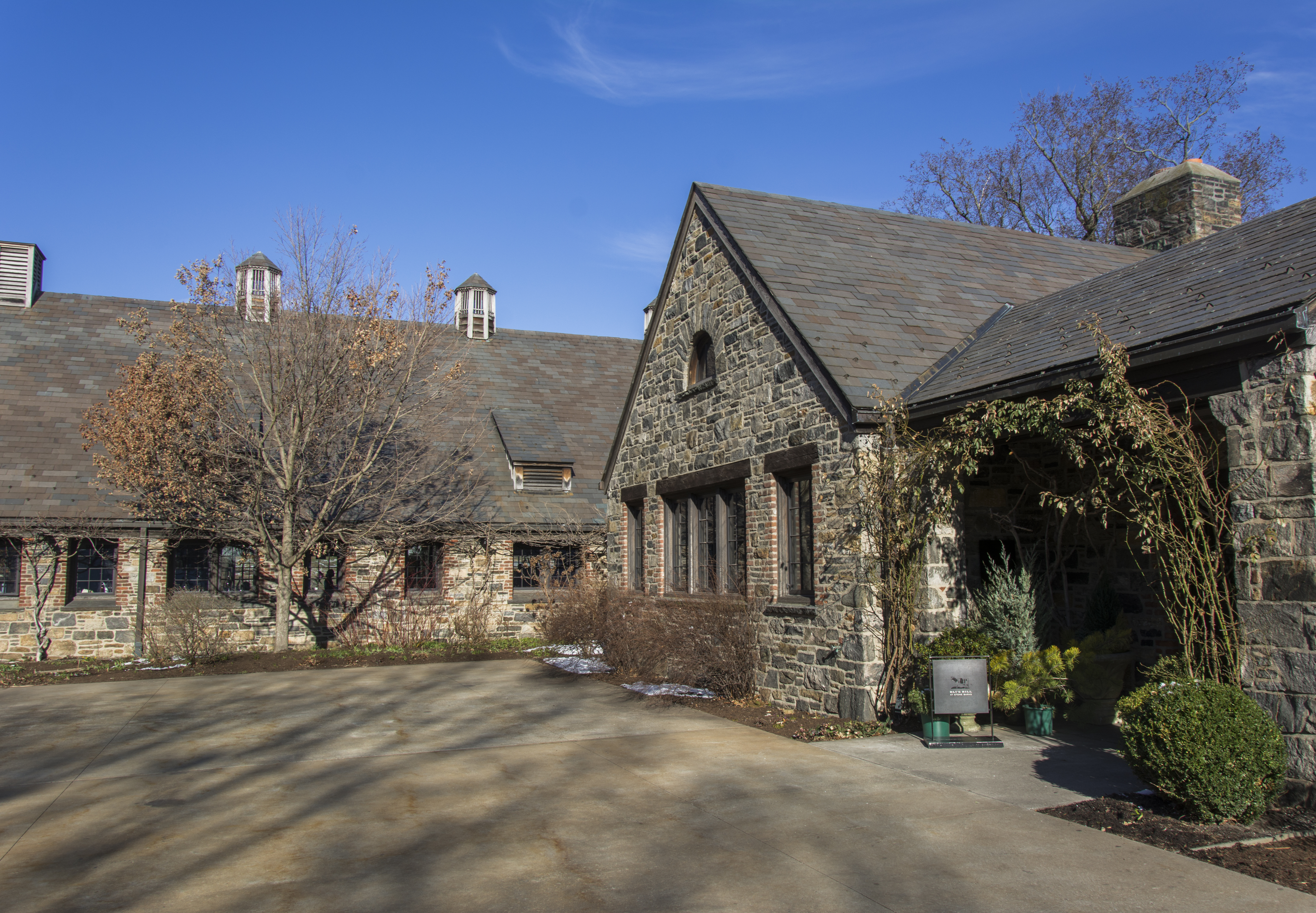
Blue Hill at Stone Barns

In spring of 2004, Blue Hill at Stone Barns opened at Stone Barns, pioneering farm-to-table dining which sources many ingredients from Stone Barns fields and pastures. In 2020, the restaurant received two stars from the Michelin Guide. Its owners, Dan, David and Laureen Barber, also own Blue Hill in New York City.

== Media ==
Episode eight of Top Chef's fifth season was filmed at Stone Barns, where competing chefs used the restaurant's kitchen to prepare a meal for the farm's workers and their families.
