= Eileen Rockefeller Growald =

American philanthropist (born 1952)

- Born: Eileen Rockefeller; February 26, 1952 (age 74); United States
- Education: Middlebury College
- Occupation: Philanthropist
- Spouse: Paul Growald
- Children: 2
- Parent(s): David Rockefeller; Margaret McGrath

Eileen Rockefeller (born February 26, 1952) is an American philanthropist. She is the youngest daughter of David Rockefeller and Margaret "Peggy" McGrath. Eileen is a member of the fourth generation of the Rockefeller family widely known as "the Cousins". Her elder siblings are Abby, Richard, Neva, Peggy, and David Jr.

== Biography ==
Growald attended the Chapin School in New York and graduated from Oldfields School in Maryland. She received her bachelor's degree from Middlebury College in 1974 and her master's in Early Childhood Education from Lesley College in association with the Shady Hill School in 1976.

In 1982, she founded and was president of the Institute for the Advancement of Health, dealing principally with the scientific understanding of mind-body interactions in health and disease; this subject has evolved into what is now called Emotional Intelligence. She co-founded The Collaborative for Academic, Social, and Emotional Learning (CASEL) in 1992.

In 2000, she and her husband, Paul Growald, founded The Champlain Valley Greenbelt Alliance (CVGA), a local non-profit organization to protect greenbelts along major corridors in Vermont. They have two sons, Daniel and Adam.

Growald, who describes herself as a venture philanthropist, is also the founding chair of Rockefeller Philanthropy Advisors, set up in New York by various members of the family in 2002. The largest advisory service of its kind, its current chair is Kevin Broderick, who served on the board of Rockefeller Financial Services and took over as chairman from Rockefeller in 2005. Its mission is to create thoughtful, effective philanthropy throughout the world.

Growald was also closely involved with The Gailer School, when it was located in Shelburne, Vermont, where she lives on the former Vanderbilt estate, Shelburne Farms.

After her brother David Rockefeller Jr., she is seen as a leader of the family's fourth generation, one of whose major funding priorities is reducing the threat of nuclear war.

== Bibliography ==
2014, Being a Rockefeller, Becoming Myself: A Memoir

== See also ==
- Rockefeller family
