= Peggy Dulany =

American philanthropist (born 1947)

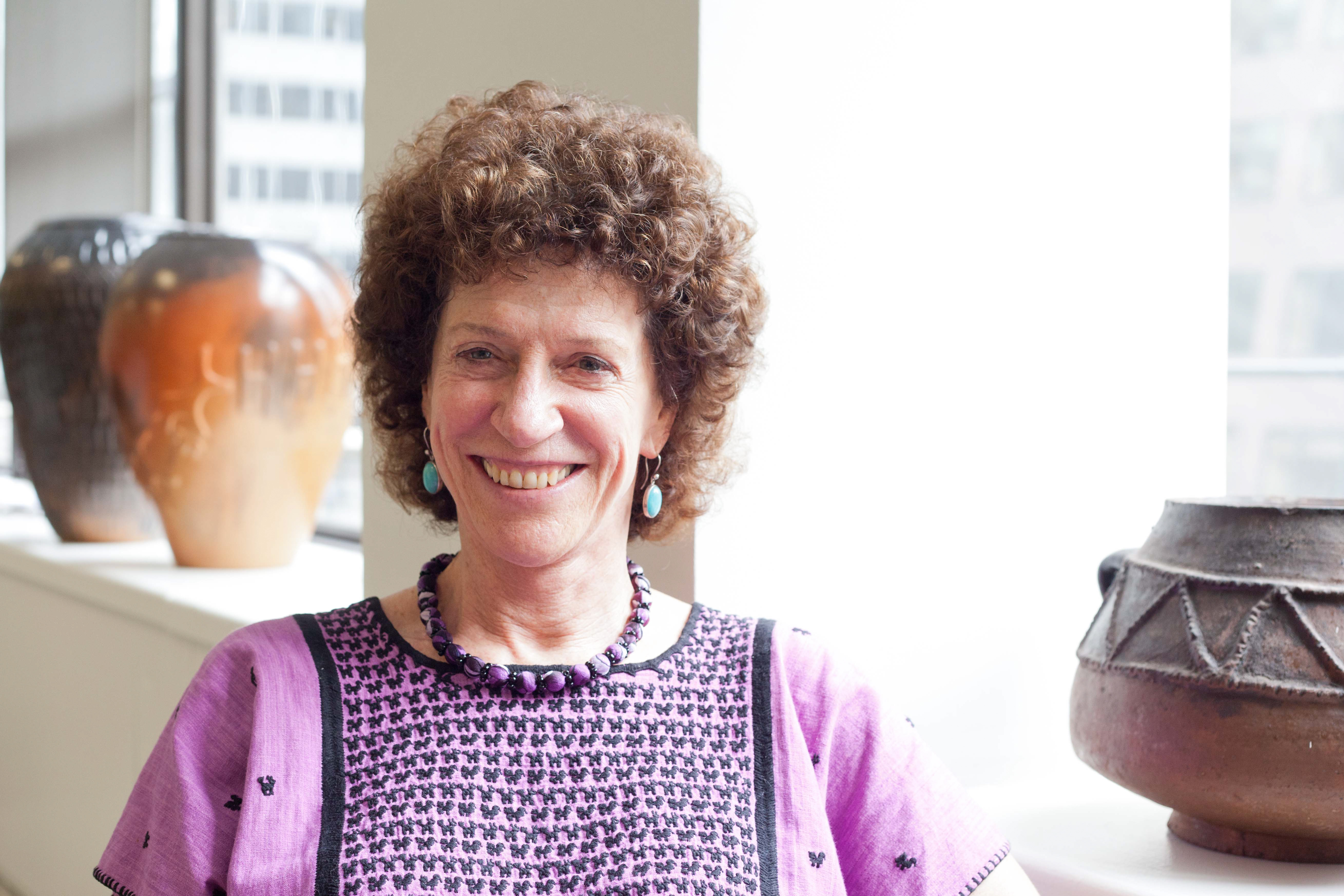
- Dulany in 2014
- Born: Margaret Dulany Rockefeller; 1947 (age 78–79)
- Education: Radcliffe College; Harvard University
- Occupations: Heiress, philanthropist
- Spouse: David Quattrone (divorced)
- Children: 1
- Parent(s): David Rockefeller; Margaret McGrath
- Relatives: See Rockefeller family

Margaret Dulany "Peggy" Rockefeller (born 1947) is an American heiress and philanthropist.

== Early life ==
Rockefeller was born in 1947. She is the fourth child of David Rockefeller and Margaret McGrath, and a fourth-generation member ("the cousins") of the Rockefeller family. Her siblings are Abby, Richard, Neva, Eileen, and David Rockefeller Jr. The name Dulany is her middle name, taken from her mother's side of the family.

Rockefeller graduated with honors in 1969 from Radcliffe College and earned a master's degree and a doctorate from the Harvard Graduate School of Education.

== Career ==
For most of that time she was a teacher as well as co-director of the STEP program for disadvantaged youth in Arlington, Massachusetts; she also spent time during her student years working with the poor in the favelas of Rio de Janeiro.

Dulany has worked with the National Endowment for the Arts on nonprofit management and planning. For five years she served as Senior Vice President of the New York City Partnership, founded by her father in 1979, where she headed the Youth Employment and Education programs.

Like her father, she has had a long involvement with the United Nations. She has been involved with consulting with the UN and the Ford Foundation on health care and family planning in Brazil, the US and Portugal. In June 2003, Dulany joined the UN Secretary-General's Panel on Civil Society and UN Relationships as the only US representative. The UN maintains the aim of the panel is to "review past and current practices and recommend improvements for the future in order to make the interaction between civil society and the United Nations more meaningful".

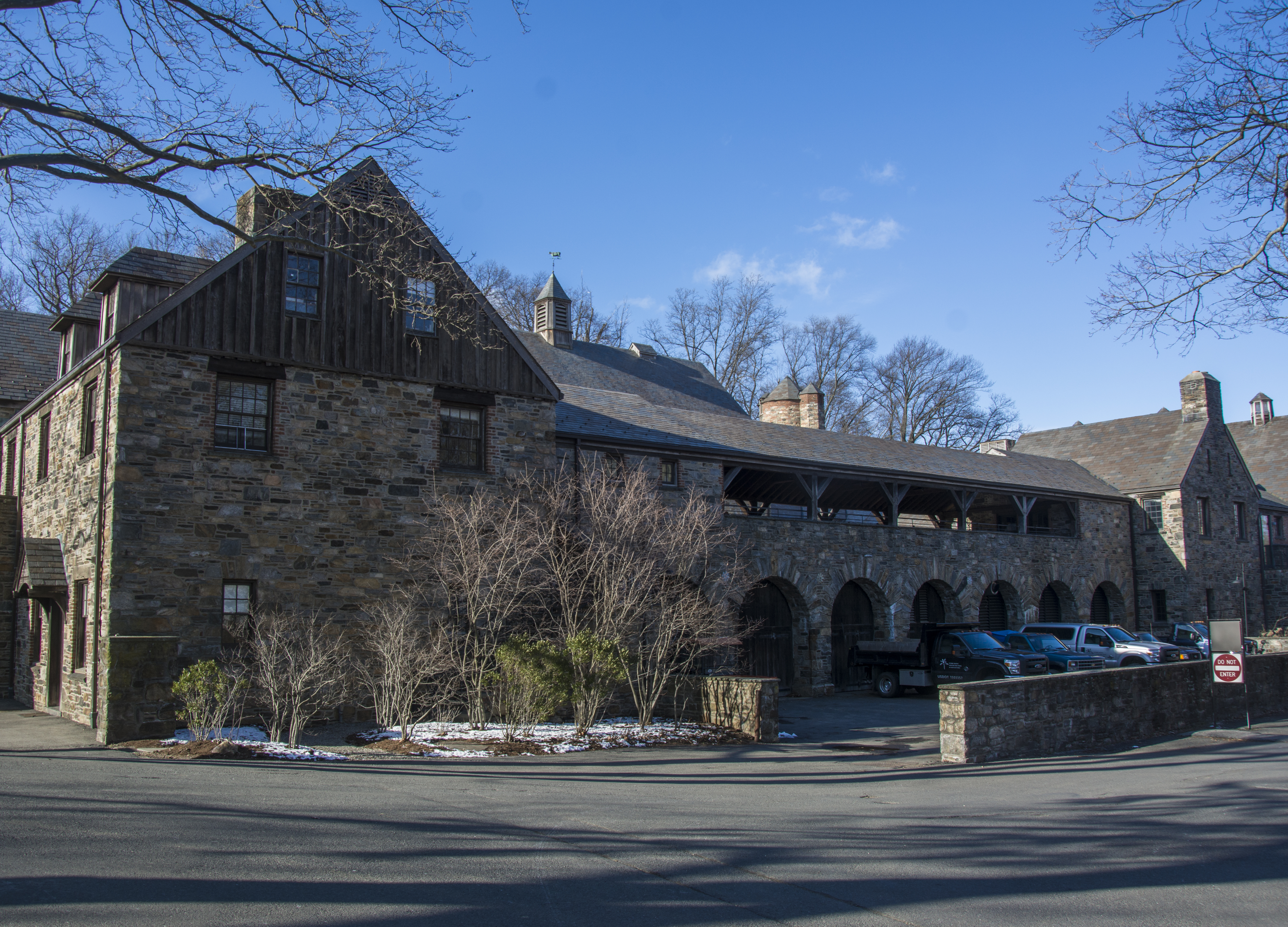
Stone Barns Center for Food & Agriculture, co-founded by John D. Rockefeller Jr. and Peggy Dulany

In 2004, Dulany and her father founded Stone Barns Center for Food and Agriculture, a non-profit farm, education, and research center located in Pocantico Hills, New York, on land formerly belonging to the John D. Rockefeller estate. The center is a living laboratory, widely recognized for its innovative agroecological farming techniques, hands-on farmer training, and high-end farm-to-table culinary experience offered by its restaurant.

She is also Chair of ProVentures, a business development company for Latin America and Southern Africa. She sits on the boards of Cambridge College, the Africa-America Institute, supports the family's Asia Society, and was previously on the board of the family's principal philanthropic organization, the Rockefeller Brothers Fund, as well as serving a five-year term on the board of trustees of the Rockefeller Foundation (1989–1994). She is also a member of the Council on Foreign Relations in New York, whose Honorary Chairman is her father.

Her most prominent public position is as founder and chair of the Synergos Institute, which she established in New York in 1986. The mission of the organization is to work together with its partners to "mobilize resources and bridge social and economic divides to reduce poverty and increase equity around the world". Its most prominent public event, the "University for a Night", brings together senior leaders from government, business and civil society in a positive dialogue on inter-sector collaboration and problem solving.

Synergos has throughout its history been actively involved with the United Nations; in 1998 it gave a dinner at UN headquarters in New York, billed as a University for a Night event, where world problems were discussed. In attendance was the Secretary-General Kofi Annan, and James Wolfensohn, then President of the World Bank, who is a close associate of the family. The Institute has received contributions from Fortune 500 companies, foundations, UNICEF, and a variety of private donors.

Synergos has also developed the "Global Philanthropists Circle" (GPC) (co-founded with her father) in 2001, a dynamic network of leading international philanthropists dedicated to eliminating poverty and increasing equity worldwide. The GPC currently has more than 100 member families from 30 countries, including South Africa, Brazil, Pakistan and the Philippines. In addition, in the 1980s and '90s, with support from the United Nations Development Programme and the Rockefeller Foundation, Synergos conducted research on partnership approaches to large-scale social problems in Africa and Asia.
