= The Gailer School =

Location
- Middlebury, VT; United States; 44.004349°N 73.160974°W

Information
- Type: 7th-12th grades
- Motto: Inspiring students to love learning and become insightful world citizens
- Established: 1989
- Closed: 2012
- Athletics: soccer, broom ball
- Mascot: the goat or python

The Gailer School was a co-educational independent day school for grades 7–12, located in Middlebury, Vermont.

== History ==
The school was founded in 1989 by Harry Chaucer, a former high school science teacher, based on his experiences with running the Chaucer house at the Champlain Valley Union High School in Hinesburg, Vermont. Dr. Chaucer followed the principles of the Coalition of Essential Schools as he designed the curriculum, placing a special emphasis on finding original sources, using those sources to develop a thesis, and then testing that thesis.

During its first year, the Gailer School operated out of Chaucer's living room. From 1990 to 1998, it rented an unused school building in Middlebury, Vermont, from the Catholic diocese. It drew its student body primarily from Addison, Chittenden, and Rutland counties and hosted a number of international students, primarily from Indonesia. During the 1997-1998 school year, the school had its highest enrollment, with over 80 students. In 1998, Gailer was quietly evicted from this location because the diocese wanted to restart its Catholic grammar school and needed its building back.

During the summer of 1998, Gailer moved from Middlebury to Shelburne, Vermont, where it would rent a space from 1998 through 2006. Analysis of a student and staff phone list from this time shows that approximately 1/3 of staff and students each came from Addison, Chittenden, and Rutland counties.

In 2006, the Board of Trustees looked at student demographics, costs, and local competition from other progressive schools, and decided to move the school back to its original home in Middlebury.

In the spring of 2009, the school rented the building at 54 Creek Road in Middlebury. However, this upswing was short-lived. After several consecutive years of being unable to generate sufficient tuition revenue in a bad economy, the school ceased operations in May 2012, after 23 years.

== Curriculum ==
Harry Chaucer named the school's educational program for Leonardo da Vinci. The original curriculum was history-based, beginning with the origin of the universe and extending to contemporary times.

The "da Vinci" curriculum stressed interdisciplinary learning, encouraging students to see the interconnectedness of science, history, mathematics, language and the written word. Classes included seminar-based discussions, lectures, student presentations, field work and group projects. Each student also took a weekly "master class", allowing the in-depth study of a chosen subject. Students also were required to perform community service to encourage and understand their connectedness to their community. Gailer was one of the first schools in Vermont to introduce community service into its curriculum.

The school aimed to foster the development of skills necessary for students to succeed in college and the world:

- Communication: written, artistic and oral communication skills essential for reasoning and expression of complex ideas.
- Mathematics: fundamental knowledge and skills; ability to imagine and solve complex problems; history of mathematics.
- Science: understanding the scientific process; history of science; scientific information, skills and theories.
- Technological Literacy: expertise in gathering and assessing information; proficiency in common computer operations.
- Cultural Fluency: understanding and appreciating a variety of cultural experiences, including geography, language, the arts, political and religious philosophies.
- Learning to Learn: ability to formulate questions, see connections among academic disciplines, solve problems and engage in lifelong learning.
- Ethics: sensitivity to ethical issues; understanding the importance of individual, institutional and corporate accountability; respect for self, others, the learning process and environment.
- Teamwork and Leadership: comfort with team situations, group problem-solving and decision-making in both supportive and leadership roles.
- Organization and Responsibility: effective organization of time and materials necessary for learning; habits of responsibility, punctuality and accountability for decisions and performance.

Further curricular details and rationale can be found in the text, A Creative Approach to the Common Core Standards - the Da Vinci Curriculum (Rowman and Littlefield, 2012).
