= Abby Rockefeller (ecologist) =

American ecologist (born 1943)

- Born: Abigail Rockefeller; 1943 (age 82–83)
- Education: New England Conservatory of Music
- Parent(s): David Rockefeller; Margaret McGrath
- Relatives: See Rockefeller family

Abigail Rockefeller (born 1943) is an American feminist, ecologist, and member of the Rockefeller family. Abby was born in Providence, Rhode Island. She was a member of Cell 16, a radical feminist organization, in the 1970s. She also founded the Clivus Multrum company, which manufactures composting toilets.

== Early life and education ==
Abby Rockefeller was born in 1943, the eldest daughter and second child of David Rockefeller and Margaret McGrath. Her father was a successful business man, and became one of the most powerful Republicans in the Senate in his time. She has an older brother, David Jr., and four younger siblings, Neva, Peggy, Richard, and Eileen. Her grandmother, Abby Aldrich Rockefeller (1874-1948), was an accomplished philanthropist.

She attended the New England Conservatory of Music in the early 1960s, where she encountered teachers critical of social inequality in the United States. This experience led her to embrace Marxism, the politics of Fidel Castro and ultimately radical feminism.

== Radical feminism ==
She joined the Boston-area female liberation movement led by Roxanne Dunbar, which subsequently changed its name to Cell 16. Along with the other Cell 16 members, Rockefeller promoted self-defense for women and became skilled in karate in response to the frequent street harassment and sexual assaults women endured at the time. They set up a Tae Kwon Do studio in Boston and taught hundreds of women who, in turn, taught other women, becoming pioneers in self-defense for women. Cell 16 allowed women to break free from the bonds that subjugated them to their subordinate roles.

After reading Cell 16's radical feminist publication, No More Fun and Games: A Journal of Female Liberation, Rockefeller decided to join the organization. In issue six, "Tell A Woman", published in May 1973, she contributed an article called "Sex: The Basis of Sexism", which posited that one driving force in sexism was male desire to access and control female sexuality for their own ends. After being infiltrated by FBI agents, Cell 16 disassociated from its splinter group, Female Liberation, which was providing a front for recruiting aspiring feminists to Trotskyism.

== Environmentalism ==
In the 1970s, Rockefeller turned her attention to environmentalism, focusing on human waste. Rockefeller was the first American to install a composting system in her home in Cambridge, Massachusetts, even though the technology had been around since the 1930s. In 1973, she founded the Clivus Multrum company to manufacture composting toilets.

As of 2005, Clivus Multrum was still the "largest distributor of composting toilets for public use in North America".

In 2012 Rockefeller founded Churchtown Dairy, a 250-acre dairy near Hudson, New York, operating a biodynamic herd of 28 Brown Swiss, Jersey, and Guernsey cows.

== Other political activities ==
Rockefeller was among the top donors to the Robert F. Kennedy Jr. 2024 presidential campaign, giving $100,000 to American Values 2024, a super PAC supporting his campaign. In 2025, she was among the top donors to the MAHA PAC in support of Kennedy's Make America Healthy Again movement, donating $60,000.
