= Rockefeller Philanthropy Advisors =

Charitable organization in New York

Rockefeller Philanthropy Advisors (RPA) is a 501(c)(3) nonprofit organization that currently advises on and manages more than $200 million in annual charitable giving. Its headquarters are in New York City, with offices in Chicago, Los Angeles and San Francisco.

Its mission statement is: "Rockefeller Philanthropy Advisors accelerates philanthropy in pursuit of a just world by providing deep global expertise to make philanthropy more thoughtful, equitable and effective.” Rockefeller Philanthropy Advisors currently advises on and manages more than $200 million in annual giving in more than 60 countries.

Rockefeller Philanthropy Advisors provides research and counsel on charitable giving, develops philanthropic programs and offers complete program, administrative and management services for foundations and trusts. RPA also operates a Charitable Giving Fund, through which clients can make gifts outside the United States, participate in funding consortia and operate nonprofit initiatives.

== History ==
It traces its antecedents to John D. Rockefeller Sr., who in 1891 began to professionally manage his philanthropy "as if it were a business." Founded in 2002 with thoughtful and effective philanthropy as its one and only mission, Rockefeller Philanthropy Advisors has grown into one of the world's largest philanthropic service organizations, having overseen more than $4 billion to date in grantmaking across the globe.

According to Inside Philanthropy, RPA grew fast in 2019 to 2022, nearly doubling expenses while revenue grew accordingly. In 2023, they reported a 40 million dollar deficit. In the same year, there were major executive level overhauls, with then-CEO Melissa Berman stepping down in early 2024. She was replaced by Latanya Mapp, who previously worked as the executive director of Planned Parenthood Global.

== Projects ==
Rockefeller Philanthropy Advisors is engaged in various philanthropic projects, among them:

- Just Transition Fund
- Science-Based Targets Network
- Global Commons Alliance
- International Fund for Public Interest Media

In an interview with environmentally focused podcast Electric Ladies, Heather Grady, Vice President of RPA, says they are "hosting more than 30 different projects that are focused on climate, or climate and nature, philanthropy."

== Criticism ==
In The Bill Gates Problem, Tim Schwab criticizes RPA of being untransparent, with organizations under it not disclosing their funding by Bill Gates.

"These organizations are under no obligation to disclose what they do with Gates’s money—even as they create projects, hubs, initiatives, and campaigns that can advance the foundation’s agenda. When I asked Rockefeller Philanthropy Advisors to help me understand what specifically they’d done with Gates’s funding, the group would not provide this information, telling me their organization 'prioritizes reporting to our funders.'"

The right-wing watchdog National Legal and Policy Center criticizes Rockefeller Philanthropy Advisors for taking money from the Gates Foundation and supporting various causes such as "'green,' pro-abortion, anti-police, and anti-MAGA propaganda".
