= Richard Rockefeller =

American physician (1949–2014)

- Born: Richard Gilder Rockefeller; January 20, 1949; New York City, U.S.
- Died: June 13, 2014 (aged 65); Harrison, New York, U.S.
- Education: Harvard University (BA, MEd, MD)
- Occupation: Physician
- Spouses: Maeve Rockefeller; Nancy King
- Children: 2
- Parent(s): David Rockefeller; Margaret McGrath
- Relatives: Rockefeller family

Richard Gilder Rockefeller (January 20, 1949 – June 13, 2014) was an American heir and family physician in Falmouth, Maine, who practiced and taught medicine in Portland, Maine, from 1982 to 2000. He was a son of David Rockefeller, a grandson of financier and philanthropist John D. Rockefeller Jr., and a great-grandson of Standard Oil co-founder John D. Rockefeller.

== Early life and education ==
Rockefeller was born on January 20, 1949, to Margaret (née McGrath) Rockefeller and banker David Rockefeller. He was also a grandson of American financier John D. Rockefeller Jr., and a great-grandson of American business magnate and philanthropist John D. Rockefeller Sr.

Rockefeller obtained an undergraduate degree from Harvard University, a master's degree in education, and a medical degree from Harvard Medical School.

== Career ==
He was chairman of the United States Advisory Board of Doctors Without Borders from 1989 until 2010, and served on the board of Rockefeller University in New York City until 2006. In the last few years of his life, Rockefeller was working to establish better worldwide methods of treatment for individuals suffering from post-traumatic stress disorder. Richard gave an inspiring talk at the San Francisco Commonwealth Club (December 9, 2013) about the use of MDMA-assisted psychotherapy to treat PTSD. During the last few years of his life, he dedicated time and resources to the research and development of GcMAF therapy, an immune boosting injection that has been successful in treating cancer and other diseases.

Rockefeller was the founder and former chairman of Hour Exchange Portland, a service credit barter in Portland and throughout the state of Maine. He also served as chairman of the board of Maine Coast Heritage Trust from 2000 to 2006. Rockefeller served as president of the Rockefeller Brothers Fund.

== Personal life ==
Rockefeller was first married to Nancy C. Anderson, with whom he had two children, Clayton and Rebecca. After their divorce, he married Nancy King, and was the stepfather to her two children. After their divorce, his first wife remarried to Dale Gowen.

== Death ==
At the time of his death, Rockefeller, an experienced pilot, was flying home after visiting his father at the Rockefeller family estate in Pocantico Hills, a hamlet in the town of Mount Pleasant, New York. The family patriarch, his father, David Rockefeller, had celebrated his 99th birthday on June 12, 2014.

Rockefeller took off from Westchester County Airport in a Piper Meridian single-engine turboprop at 8:08 a.m. on Friday, June 13, 2014, departing from runway 16 in dense fog and steady rain. Less than 10 minutes later, the Federal Aviation Administration notified airport officials it had lost contact with the pilot. At 8:23 a.m. local police in the town of Harrison, New York, reported Rockefeller's plane crashed less than a mile from the airport in the town of Harrison. Rockefeller, the pilot, was the only person in the private plane.

The cause of the crash was attributed to the pilot's failure to maintain a positive climb rate after takeoff due to spatial disorientation (somatogravic illusion).

Rockefeller was the only one of the six siblings to have died during his father's lifetime. Through him, he was also a nephew of the late U.S. Vice President Nelson Rockefeller.
