= ICRW =

ICRW may refer to:

- International Center for Research on Women
- International Convention for the Regulation of Whaling
