= Walter Scott's Personality Parade =

Gossip column in the American magazine "Parade"

"Walter Scott's Personality Parade" was a column in Parade magazine featuring celebrity gossip. As of 2001 Edward Klein was the author of the column, which appeared in the inside cover of the magazine.

For a 33 year period beginning with the column's establishment in 1958, it was written by Lloyd Shearer while he used the name Walter Scott. In this column he discussed rumors about celebrities using a question and answer style. Joyce Wadler of The New York Times stated that the column's readership was 50 million "in its heyday". Elaine Woo of the Los Angeles Times wrote that "It may have been the most widely read column in the country" under Shearer and that under Klein it continued to be the "most popular feature" in the magazine.

Lloyd Shearer's assistants sorted through reader mail to separate what Woo described as "those that were confusing or from crackpots, who were as legion as his legitimate and well-placed sources." Under Shearer the column received around 4,000 to 7,000 reader letters. One given topic may be the subject of up to 100 of those letters at a time. Shearer's children often assisted Shearer with his publication.

His son Derek Shearer, along with Lloyd Shearer's editor and other family members, stated that the questions printed in the column were composites of those submitted by readers and that Lloyd Shearer himself did not make any of the questions. Wadler stated "it was known that Mr. Shearer wrote many of the questions". Woo wrote that "Some journalists suggested that he made up many questions to suit his own agenda."

During the time he wrote the column Shearer had copyrighted its name. During Shearer's rule, popular publications and political magazines analyzed "Personality Parade." A compilation of several columns, Parade: The Best of Walter Scott's Personality Parade From the Fifties through the Nineties, was published in 1995.

== History ==
Shearer began the column in March 1958. Wadler wrote that questions from readers had prompted Shearer to start the column. In the foreword of the 1995 compilation Shearer wrote that in 1957 he gave Jess Gorkin, the editor of Parade, a suggestion arguing that the magazine should start a column that verified questions about public figures after he had received questions from readers in response to his profiles of celebrities.

As of 1976, the weekly readership was around 50 million persons because Parade was distributed to 111 U.S. newspapers. In 1976 Shearer stated that the focus of the column was originally film stars but shifted to publishers and politicians; Shearer stated that as the medium of television gained popularity the film stars became less and less prominent to the public, but that the television actors were "not particularly colorful, not particularly maverick" because "the stars of television are very circumspect, because the people who sponsor them won't put up with any nonsense."

In 1991 Shearer stopped writing the column and sold it and its rights to Parade. Shearer stopped due to Parkinson's disease. The magazine declined to state what the price of the column was.
