= Ravi Verma =

- Born: March 22, 1953 (age 73); Balrampur, Uttar Pradesh
- Education: IIT Bombay, University of California, Los Angeles, Johns Hopkins School, London School of Hygiene & Tropical Medicine
- Known for: AIDS, Research on Men and Masculinity
- Spouse: Laxmi Verma
- Children: Abhishek Verma (Son), Pooja Verma - Thapar (Daughter)
- Scientific career
- Workplaces: International Center for Research on Women, Population Council, International Institute for Population Sciences

Ravi Verma is the regional director for the International Center for Research on Women's Asia Regional Office and leads the organization's local and regional efforts on various aspects related to research, providing expertise in building capacity and participating in policy dialogue on issues that include adolescent girls, reproductive health, HIV/AIDS, and gender-based violence.

== Education ==
Ravi Verma completed his master's in psychology from Allahabad University 1977. In the year 1981, he received his PhD in Social Sciences from IIT Bombay. There after he pursued a PG Diploma in health promotion from University of California, Los Angeles and leadership trainings on reproductive health and public health from London School of Hygiene & Tropical Medicine and Johns Hopkins University respectively.

== Career ==
Ravi Verma started his career with International Institute for Population Sciences where he was a Professor in the Department of Population Policies and Programs. He then joined as a program associate with Population Council where he worked on innovative operations research projects on gender and HIV. Ravi Verma joined ICRW in 2007.

== Expertise and programs ==
Ravi Verma's areas of expertise include HIV and AIDS, Engaging Men and Boys, Population and Reproductive Health, Violence Against Women. Ravi Verma has led many research programs and initiative of importance that include Gender-based violence, engaging the community to promote gender equality among young men, gender equality movement in schools(GEMS). Some of the major programs conceived, implemented and executed by Ravi in collaboration with partner organizations are:

- Research and Intervention for Sexual Health: Theory to Action (RISHTA)
- GEMS
- Parivartan - Coaching Boys into Men A brief video from the Parivartan programme:
- Yari Dosti
- Sakhi Saheli - Promoting gender equality and empowering young women
- Let's raise our voice event, 2013:
- Commission on the Status of Women (CSW): Invited to the CSW 2013 Program for Why do men use violence and how do we stop it: new evidence on men's use of violence against women and girls and its uses for enhanced prevention.

== Awards and honors ==
- Ravi Verma was selected as a member of the High-Level Committee on the Status of Women effective May 21, 2013, by the Government of India. This committee has been set up to undertake a comprehensive study to understand the status of women since 1989.
- Ravi Verma was elected as one of 18 members of the Rights and Empowerment Working Group for Family Planning 2020
- Ravi currently serves as a Commissioner on the Lancet Commission on Gender and Global health.
