= Vengris =

- Lithuanian surname
- m.: Venris
- f.: (unmarried): Vengrytė, Vengraitė
- f.: (married): Vengrienė

Vengris is a Lithuanian-language surname literally meaning "Hungarian person". Notable people with the surname include:

- Indré Vengris, birth name of Indré Rockefeller, American businesswoman, environmentalist and fashion executive
- Kristina Vengrytė (born 19812), Lithuanian women's basketball player
- Saulius Vengris (born 1942), Lithuanian physicist
- Tomas Vengris, Lithuanian-American film director and editor
