= Generation Engage =

GenerationEngage was a non-partisan, non-profit organization founded by the children of prominent American political figures that combined grassroots outreach with new technologies to increase civic participation rates among young Americans who lack college experience. GenerationEngage was founded in 2004 by Jay Rockefeller's son Justin Rockefeller and Strobe Talbott's sons Adrian and Devin. John Edwards's daughter Cate was a founding board member.

The organization was acquired by Mobilize.org in January 2010.

== Strategy ==
GenerationEngage combined grass-roots outreach with new technologies to increase civic participation rates among young Americans who lack college experience. GenGage employs full-time staff in local communities, who, thanks to strategic corporate partnerships with Apple and Google, connect GenerationEngage members in schools, churches, pool halls, and community centers around the country via videoconference for interactive conversations with prominent national and international civic leaders on critical social issues.

== Past speakers ==
Video of GenerationEngage iChat conversations with prominent civic leaders, like President Bill Clinton, Former Speaker of the House Newt Gingrich, Associate Supreme Court Justice Stephen Breyer, Coretta Scott King, Spike Lee, Vice President Al Gore, major 2008 presidential candidates, numerous local civic leaders, and representatives of international aid organizations, can viewed at GenerationEngage's YouTube Channel.
