= Devin Talbott =

American entrepreneur

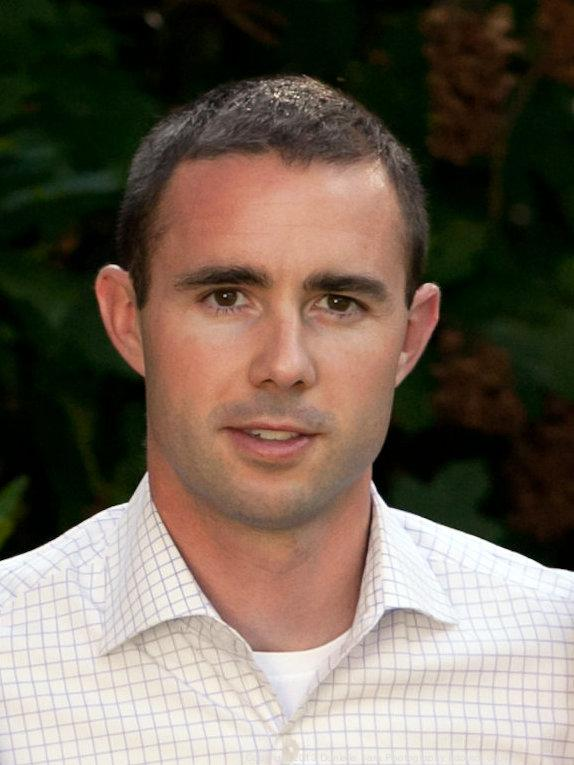
- Born: September 20, 1976 (age 49); Washington D.C., United States
- Education: Amherst College
- Occupation: Private Investor
- Parent(s): Strobe Talbott, Brooke Shearer

Devin Talbott (born September 20, 1976) is an American entrepreneur and private investor, and the son of foreign policy expert Strobe Talbott.

== Early life ==
Talbott grew up in Washington D.C. and attended Amherst College, where he was a four-year varsity soccer player. He also earned JD and MBA degrees from Georgetown University.

== Career ==
Talbott began his investment banking career at Lazard and then worked for former Defense Secretary William Cohen's merchant bank, TCG Financial Partners. After that, Talbott became a vice president of investment firm D.E. Shaw & Co. before branching out to found Enlightenment Capital, an aerospace, defense & government focused private investment firm, in 2012.

Since its founding, Enlightenment Capital has raised five funds. Talbott also co-founded Generation Engage, a non-profit focused on engaging young voters in politics and civics, with his brother Adrian and Jay Rockefeller's son Justin.

== Other positions ==
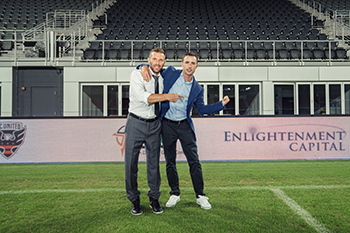

Talbott served as a term member of the Council of Foreign Relations and is a former advisory board member of the Aspen Security Forum.

Talbott was a part owner of the Washington Spirit of the National Women's Soccer League in 2021 when the club won its first league championship.

As of June 2022, he is a part owner of DC United of Major League Soccer. In May of 2024, Talbott became a founding member of the ownership group of DC Power FC of the USL Super League.

== Recognition ==
Talbott was recognized in M&A Advisor’s "40 Under 40," as an emerging leader in the financing industry before the age of 40. He was named by Washingtonian magazine as one of Washington’s Top Tech Leaders and to Washington Business Journal's Power 100.
