= Subhalakshmi Nandi =

Subhalakshmi Nandi is an Indian gender equality campaigner and researcher. In 2019 she was on the BBC's 100 Women list.

Nandi led the women's economic portfolio at UN Women's Multi Country Office for India, Bhutan, Maldives and Sri Lanka. She then became Director of Policy Analysis at ICRW Asia, before joining the Bill & Melinda Gates Foundation (BMGF) as Senior Program Officer for Gender Equality in India.

== Publications ==
- (with Rituparna Borah) "Reclaiming the Feminist Politics of 'SlutWalk'". International Feminist Journal of Politics. 14 (3): 415–421. 2012-09-01. doi:10.1080/14616742.2012.699776.
- (with Srishty Anand) 'Reflection on Reasons for Declining Women’s Labour Participation Rates: Continuum of Paid and Unpaid Work for Women in India', International Multidisciplinary Research Journal, Vol. 1, Issue 1 (July 2019), pp.63-70
- Roadmap for Women's Economic Empowerment with a Focus on Women in Informal Economy and in Agriculture. UN Women, 2020
- (ed. with Ellina Samantroy) Gender, Unpaid Work and Care in India. Routledge, 2022.
