= New Leaders Council =

American civic leadership training program since 2005

New Leaders Council (NLC) is a 501(c)(3) non-profit organization in the United States that works to recruit, train and promote young progressive leaders ranging from elected officials and civically-engaged leaders in business and industry.

NLC's main objective is in "recruiting emerging leaders from outside of the traditional power structures, engaging them on both local and national levels, and equipping them to be civic leaders – not only for elective office, but also in their communities and workplaces."

As of 2026 Charisse Price is chairman of the board for the organization.

== History ==
The New Leaders Council was founded in 2005 and runs on a budget of $900,000.

=== NLC Institute Program ===
At once-monthly NLC Institute seminars, experts provide advanced training in entrepreneurship, communications and marketing, fundraising and campaign management, public speaking and speech writing, and political technology and public relations, to selected fellows, a program of leadership development training with mentoring, networking, and job placement opportunities.

The goal of NLC is to create a new generation of progressive leaders in various fields, who are capable of working together to establish the infrastructure required for strong democracy, social justice, and equal opportunity.

==== Affiliated organizations ====
New Leaders Council is affiliated with the Center for American Progress, The New Deal, Truman National Security Project, Roosevelt Institute, Mobilize.org, Netroots Nation, Teach for America, Our Time, Louisiana Progress, Young People For, Public Allies Chicago, She Should Run.

== Alumni ==
- Nida Allam
- Lauren Underwood
- Alessandra Biaggi
- Carlos Ramirez-Rosa
