= List of Indian states by life expectancy at birth =

India is composed of 28 states and 8 union territories (including Delhi). The last change in the administrative structure took place in 2019-2020, when the two union territories of Daman and Diu and Dadra and Nagar Haveli were merged into one, called Dadra and Nagar Haveli and Daman and Diu.

Life expectancy in India is below the global average, but is increasing at a rate that exceeds the global average.

According to estimation of the United Nations, in 2023 life expectancy in India was 72.00 years (70.52 for male, 73.60 for female). For comparison, life expectancy in the world was 73.17.

Estimation of the World Bank Group for India for 2023 is exactly the same: 72.00 years in total (70.52 for male, 73.60 for female). With average life expectancy in the world 73.33 years.

== Estimations of SRS ==
These are data of Indian national demographic survey "Sample Registration System" (SRS). Tables below contains only data for biggest states and union territories. Record "India on average" contains averaged data for all states and union territories.

=== 2020-2024 ===
| state | on the whole | | | | urban | | | | rural | | | | urban Δ rural |
| state | overall | males | females | F Δ M | overall | males | females | F Δ M | overall | males | females | F Δ M | urban Δ rural |
|---|---|---|---|---|---|---|---|---|---|---|---|---|---|
| India on average | 70.6 | 68.7 | 72.8 | 4.1 | 73.2 | 71.6 | 75.1 | 3.5 | 69.4 | 67.4 | 71.8 | 4.4 | 3.8 |
| Kerala | 75.6 | 72.5 | 78.7 | 6.2 | 75.0 | 72.0 | 78.0 | 6.0 | 76.2 | 72.9 | 79.4 | 6.5 | −1.2 |
| Himachal Pradesh | 74.7 | 71.3 | 78.4 | 7.1 | 76.1 | 75.0 | 77.1 | 2.1 | 74.5 | 71.0 | 78.5 | 7.5 | 1.6 |
| Jammu and Kashmir | 74.6 | 73.8 | 75.4 | 1.6 | 76.4 | 75.5 | 77.5 | 2.0 | 73.8 | 73.2 | 74.4 | 1.2 | 2.6 |
| Delhi | 73.9 | 72.1 | 76.1 | 4.0 | 74.0 | 72.0 | 76.6 | 4.6 | 71.5 | 68.2 | 75.6 | 7.4 | 2.5 |
| Tamil Nadu | 73.6 | 71.7 | 75.8 | 4.1 | 76.3 | 74.9 | 77.8 | 2.9 | 70.7 | 68.1 | 73.5 | 5.4 | 5.6 |
| Maharashtra | 73.1 | 70.9 | 75.6 | 4.7 | 75.2 | 73.4 | 77.3 | 3.9 | 71.5 | 69.0 | 74.4 | 5.4 | 3.7 |
| West Bengal | 72.7 | 71.5 | 74.1 | 2.6 | 74.8 | 73.6 | 76.2 | 2.6 | 71.7 | 70.3 | 73.1 | 2.8 | 3.1 |
| Uttarakhand | 71.7 | 68.6 | 75.3 | 6.7 | 71.4 | 69.5 | 73.5 | 4.0 | 71.8 | 68.2 | 75.9 | 7.7 | −0.4 |
| Andhra Pradesh | 71.1 | 68.8 | 73.8 | 5.0 | 73.1 | 71.2 | 75.3 | 4.1 | 70.1 | 67.6 | 73.0 | 5.4 | 3.0 |
| Punjab | 71.0 | 68.9 | 73.4 | 4.5 | 72.8 | 71.6 | 74.3 | 2.7 | 69.7 | 67.1 | 72.7 | 5.6 | 3.1 |
| Telangana | 71.0 | 68.6 | 73.7 | 5.1 | 72.0 | 70.5 | 73.8 | 3.3 | 70.1 | 67.0 | 73.5 | 6.5 | 1.9 |
| Rajasthan | 70.9 | 68.3 | 73.8 | 5.5 | 72.9 | 70.3 | 75.7 | 5.4 | 70.3 | 67.7 | 73.2 | 5.5 | 2.6 |
| Gujarat | 70.7 | 67.8 | 74.1 | 6.3 | 73.3 | 71.2 | 75.8 | 4.6 | 68.7 | 65.3 | 72.8 | 7.5 | 4.6 |
| Odisha | 70.4 | 69.2 | 71.8 | 2.6 | 72.1 | 70.6 | 73.7 | 3.1 | 70.1 | 68.9 | 71.4 | 2.5 | 2.0 |
| Karnataka | 70.2 | 68.0 | 72.6 | 4.6 | 72.8 | 72.2 | 73.5 | 1.3 | 68.6 | 65.5 | 72.1 | 6.6 | 4.2 |
| Bihar | 69.5 | 69.1 | 70.0 | 0.9 | 71.5 | 71.5 | 71.6 | 0.1 | 69.2 | 68.6 | 69.8 | 1.2 | 2.3 |
| Jharkhand | 69.5 | 68.4 | 70.7 | 2.3 | 71.4 | 70.7 | 72.3 | 1.6 | 68.8 | 67.5 | 70.1 | 2.6 | 2.6 |
| Assam | 69.0 | 67.1 | 71.4 | 4.3 | 73.7 | 72.2 | 75.3 | 3.1 | 68.2 | 66.2 | 70.8 | 4.6 | 5.5 |
| Haryana | 68.9 | 66.1 | 72.3 | 6.2 | 70.0 | 67.9 | 72.4 | 4.5 | 68.2 | 65.0 | 72.2 | 7.2 | 1.8 |
| Uttar Pradesh | 68.7 | 67.0 | 70.7 | 3.7 | 70.5 | 68.9 | 72.2 | 3.3 | 68.2 | 66.5 | 70.3 | 3.8 | 2.3 |
| Madhya Pradesh | 68.0 | 65.7 | 70.8 | 5.1 | 70.7 | 68.3 | 73.5 | 5.2 | 67.1 | 64.8 | 69.9 | 5.1 | 3.6 |
| Chhattisgarh | 64.7 | 62.5 | 67.1 | 4.6 | 66.5 | 63.7 | 70.1 | 6.4 | 64.1 | 62.1 | 66.3 | 4.2 | 2.4 |

Data source: RCCGI

=== 2016—2020 ===
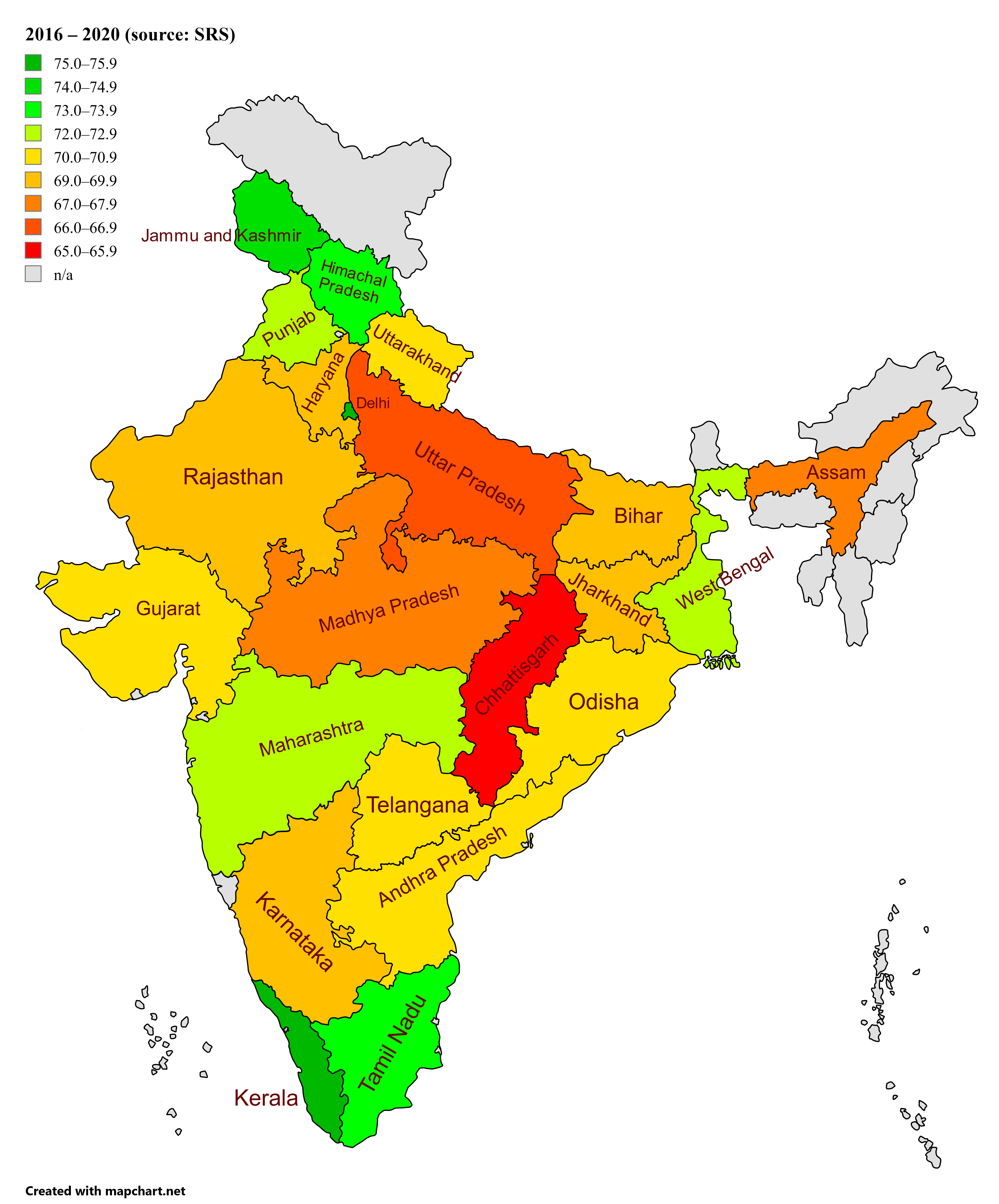
Indian states by life expectancy in 2016—2020, according to estimation of SRS

| state | on the whole | | | | urban | | | | rural | | | | urban Δ rural |
| state | overall | males | females | F Δ M | overall | males | females | F Δ M | overall | males | females | F Δ M | urban Δ rural |
|---|---|---|---|---|---|---|---|---|---|---|---|---|---|
| India on average | 70.0 | 68.6 | 71.4 | 2.8 | 73.2 | 71.9 | 74.5 | 2.6 | 68.6 | 67.2 | 70.1 | 2.9 | 4.6 |
| Delhi | 75.8 | 74.1 | 77.7 | 3.6 | 75.8 | 74.1 | 77.8 | 3.7 | 74.0 | — | 76.6 | — | 1.8 |
| Kerala | 75.0 | 71.9 | 78.0 | 6.1 | 74.7 | 71.5 | 78.0 | 6.5 | 75.2 | 72.3 | 78.1 | 5.8 | −0.5 |
| Jammu and Kashmir | 74.3 | 72.6 | 76.3 | 3.7 | 78.1 | 76.0 | 80.5 | 4.5 | 72.7 | 71.1 | 74.6 | 3.5 | 5.4 |
| Himachal Pradesh | 73.5 | 70.3 | 77.5 | 7.2 | 77.1 | 74.7 | 81.0 | 6.3 | 73.2 | 69.9 | 77.2 | 7.3 | 3.9 |
| Tamil Nadu | 73.2 | 71.0 | 75.5 | 4.5 | 75.8 | 73.7 | 78.2 | 4.5 | 70.5 | 68.3 | 72.9 | 4.6 | 5.3 |
| Maharashtra | 72.9 | 71.6 | 74.3 | 2.7 | 74.6 | 73.4 | 76.1 | 2.7 | 71.6 | 70.2 | 73.0 | 2.8 | 3.0 |
| Punjab | 72.5 | 70.8 | 74.5 | 3.7 | 75.5 | 73.3 | 78.1 | 4.8 | 70.9 | 69.2 | 72.9 | 3.7 | 4.6 |
| West Bengal | 72.3 | 71.1 | 73.6 | 2.5 | 74.5 | 73.8 | 75.3 | 1.5 | 71.1 | 69.6 | 72.7 | 3.1 | 3.4 |
| Andhra Pradesh | 70.6 | 69.1 | 72.2 | 3.1 | 72.7 | 71.6 | 73.8 | 2.2 | 69.7 | 68.0 | 71.6 | 3.6 | 3.0 |
| Uttarakhand | 70.6 | 67.5 | 73.9 | 6.4 | 71.0 | 68.8 | 73.7 | 4.9 | 70.3 | 67.0 | 73.9 | 6.9 | 0.7 |
| Gujarat | 70.5 | 68.1 | 73.2 | 5.1 | 72.2 | 70.9 | 73.6 | 2.7 | 69.2 | 65.9 | 73.1 | 7.2 | 3.0 |
| Odisha | 70.3 | 69.1 | 71.4 | 2.3 | 72.2 | 70.9 | 73.2 | 2.3 | 69.8 | 68.7 | 71.0 | 2.3 | 2.4 |
| Telangana | 70.0 | 68.7 | 71.4 | 2.7 | 72.2 | 72.0 | 72.4 | 0.4 | 68.4 | 66.5 | 70.5 | 4.0 | 3.8 |
| Haryana | 69.9 | 67.3 | 73.0 | 5.7 | 72.0 | 69.5 | 75.1 | 5.6 | 68.7 | 66.1 | 71.9 | 5.8 | 3.3 |
| Karnataka | 69.8 | 67.9 | 71.9 | 4.0 | 73.3 | 71.9 | 74.8 | 2.9 | 68.2 | 66.0 | 70.6 | 4.6 | 5.1 |
| Jharkhand | 69.6 | 70.5 | 68.9 | −1.6 | 72.2 | 71.9 | 72.4 | 0.5 | 68.8 | 70.0 | 67.9 | −2.1 | 3.4 |
| Bihar | 69.5 | 69.7 | 69.2 | −0.5 | 71.9 | 72.3 | 71.3 | −1.0 | 69.1 | 69.3 | 68.9 | −0.4 | 2.8 |
| Rajasthan | 69.4 | 67.1 | 71.7 | 4.6 | 72.6 | 71.5 | 73.6 | 2.1 | 68.4 | 65.8 | 71.2 | 5.4 | 4.2 |
| Assam | 67.9 | 67.3 | 68.6 | 1.3 | 74.1 | 73.3 | 75.0 | 1.7 | 66.7 | 66.2 | 67.4 | 1.2 | 7.4 |
| Madhya Pradesh | 67.4 | 65.5 | 69.5 | 4.0 | 70.8 | 69.3 | 72.4 | 3.1 | 66.4 | 64.3 | 68.7 | 4.4 | 4.4 |
| Uttar Pradesh | 66.0 | 65.3 | 66.7 | 1.4 | 69.2 | 69.1 | 69.3 | 0.2 | 65.0 | 64.2 | 65.9 | 1.7 | 4.2 |
| Chhattisgarh | 65.1 | 63.5 | 66.8 | 3.3 | 68.0 | 66.7 | 69.4 | 2.7 | 64.3 | 62.6 | 66.0 | 3.4 | 3.7 |

Data source: RCCGI

=== 1990-2019 ===
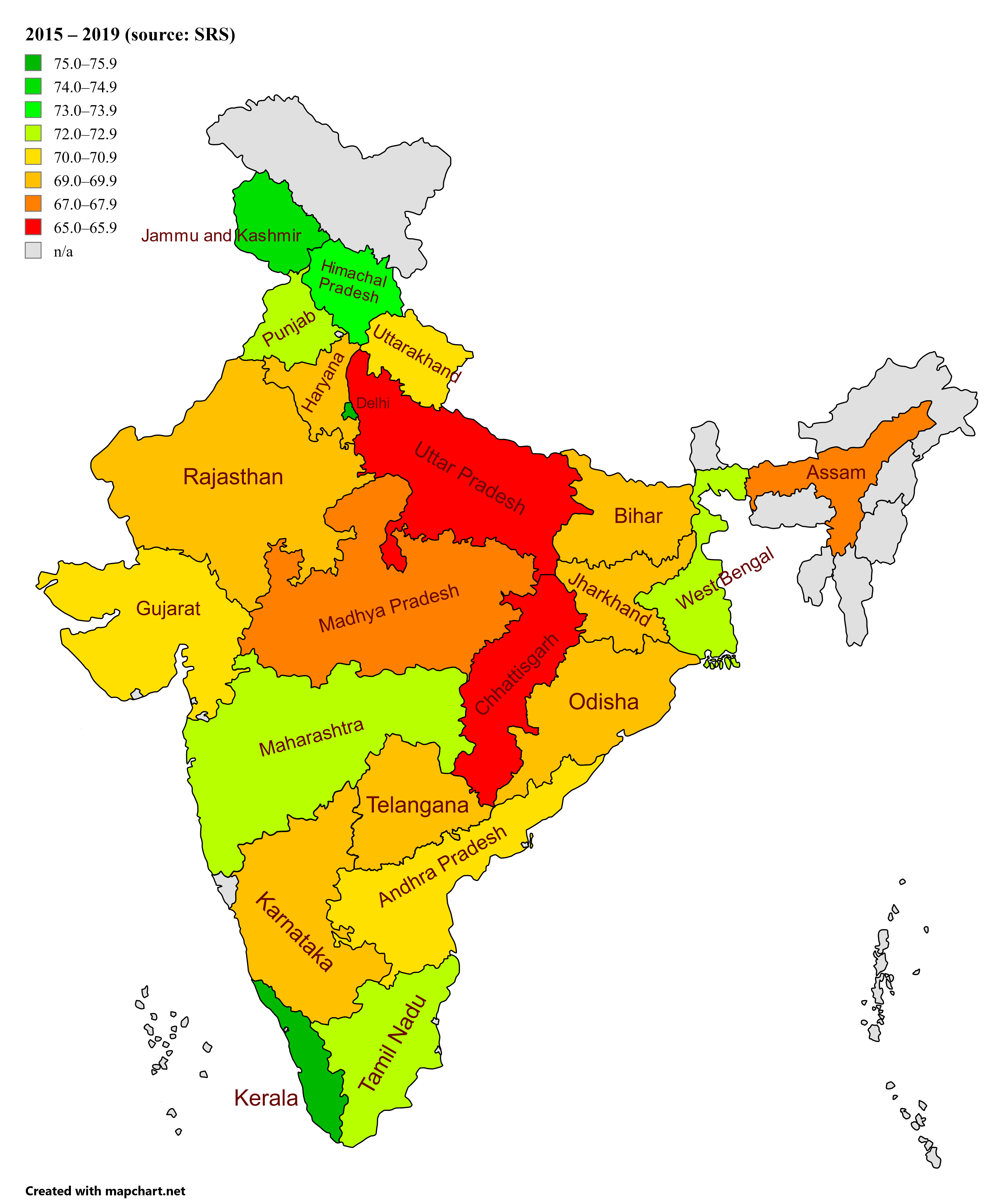
Indian states by life expectancy in 2015—2019, according to estimation of SRS

| state | on the whole | | | | urban | | | | rural | | | | urban Δ rural |
| state | overall | males | females | F Δ M | overall | males | females | F Δ M | overall | males | females | F Δ M | urban Δ rural |
|---|---|---|---|---|---|---|---|---|---|---|---|---|---|
| India on average | 69.7 | 68.4 | 71.1 | 2.7 | 73.0 | 71.8 | 74.2 | 2.4 | 68.3 | 66.9 | 69.7 | 2.8 | 4.7 |
| Delhi | 75.9 | 74.3 | 77.5 | 3.2 | 75.9 | 74.4 | 77.6 | 3.2 | 73.6 | 71.3 | 75.6 | 4.3 | 2.3 |
| Kerala | 75.2 | 72.3 | 78.0 | 5.7 | 75.1 | 72.1 | 78.0 | 5.9 | 75.2 | 72.4 | 78.1 | 5.7 | −0.1 |
| Jammu and Kashmir | 74.2 | 72.6 | 76.1 | 3.5 | 77.6 | 75.7 | 79.6 | 3.9 | 72.8 | 71.2 | 74.6 | 3.4 | 4.8 |
| Himachal Pradesh | 73.1 | 69.9 | 77.1 | 7.2 | 77.8 | 74.9 | 82.3 | 7.4 | 72.8 | 69.4 | 76.8 | 7.4 | 5.0 |
| Punjab | 72.8 | 71.1 | 74.7 | 3.6 | 75.4 | 73.0 | 78.6 | 5.6 | 71.3 | 69.7 | 73.3 | 3.6 | 4.1 |
| Maharashtra | 72.7 | 71.6 | 74.0 | 2.4 | 74.5 | 73.2 | 76.0 | 2.8 | 71.4 | 70.2 | 72.5 | 2.3 | 3.1 |
| Tamil Nadu | 72.6 | 70.6 | 74.9 | 4.3 | 74.9 | 73.0 | 77.1 | 4.1 | 70.4 | 68.3 | 72.7 | 4.4 | 4.5 |
| West Bengal | 72.1 | 71.0 | 73.2 | 2.2 | 74.3 | 73.6 | 75.1 | 1.5 | 70.9 | 69.5 | 72.2 | 2.7 | 3.4 |
| Uttarakhand | 70.6 | 67.6 | 73.9 | 6.3 | 71.0 | 68.7 | 73.7 | 5.0 | 70.4 | 67.1 | 73.9 | 6.8 | 0.6 |
| Andhra Pradesh | 70.3 | 68.9 | 71.8 | 2.9 | 72.7 | 71.8 | 73.5 | 1.7 | 69.4 | 67.7 | 71.2 | 3.5 | 3.3 |
| Gujarat | 70.2 | 67.9 | 72.8 | 4.9 | 72.0 | 70.8 | 73.2 | 2.4 | 68.9 | 65.7 | 72.5 | 6.8 | 3.1 |
| Haryana | 69.9 | 67.7 | 72.6 | 4.9 | 72.4 | 70.1 | 75.0 | 4.9 | 68.6 | 66.3 | 71.4 | 5.1 | 3.8 |
| Telangana | 69.8 | 68.6 | 71.1 | 2.5 | 71.9 | 71.7 | 72.1 | 0.4 | 68.3 | 66.6 | 70.1 | 3.5 | 3.6 |
| Odisha | 69.8 | 68.5 | 71.1 | 2.6 | 72.2 | 71.3 | 73.1 | 1.8 | 69.3 | 68.0 | 70.7 | 2.7 | 2.9 |
| Karnataka | 69.5 | 67.9 | 71.3 | 3.4 | 72.8 | 71.7 | 73.9 | 2.2 | 67.9 | 66.0 | 70.0 | 4.0 | 4.9 |
| Jharkhand | 69.4 | 70.2 | 68.8 | −1.4 | 72.2 | 71.8 | 72.6 | 0.8 | 68.6 | 69.6 | 67.7 | −1.9 | 3.6 |
| Bihar | 69.2 | 69.6 | 68.8 | −0.8 | 72.0 | 72.5 | 71.4 | −1.1 | 68.8 | 69.2 | 68.4 | −0.8 | 3.2 |
| Rajasthan | 69.0 | 66.8 | 71.3 | 4.5 | 72.6 | 71.8 | 73.3 | 1.5 | 67.9 | 65.4 | 70.6 | 5.2 | 4.7 |
| Assam | 67.5 | 66.8 | 68.3 | 1.5 | 74.1 | 73.3 | 74.9 | 1.6 | 66.2 | 65.6 | 67.0 | 1.4 | 7.9 |
| Madhya Pradesh | 67.0 | 65.2 | 69.1 | 3.9 | 70.7 | 69.4 | 72.2 | 2.8 | 65.9 | 63.8 | 68.1 | 4.3 | 4.8 |
| Uttar Pradesh | 65.6 | 65.0 | 66.2 | 1.2 | 68.9 | 68.8 | 69.0 | 0.2 | 64.6 | 63.8 | 65.3 | 1.5 | 4.3 |
| Chhattisgarh | 65.3 | 63.7 | 66.9 | 3.2 | 68.3 | 67.0 | 69.8 | 2.8 | 64.4 | 62.8 | 66.0 | 3.2 | 3.9 |

Data source: RCCGI

== Estimations of NFHS ==
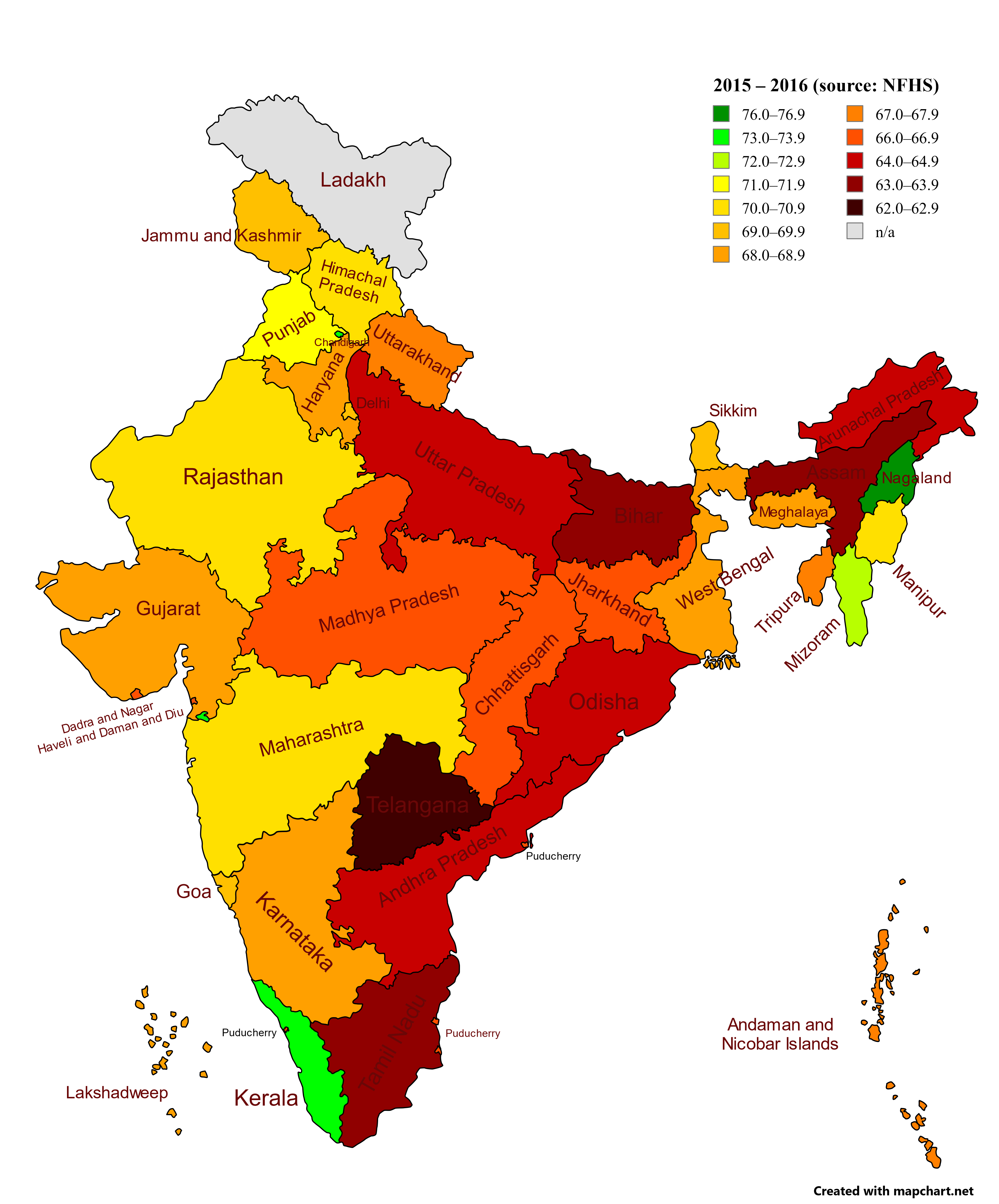
Indian states by life expectancy in 2015—2016, according to estimation of NFHS

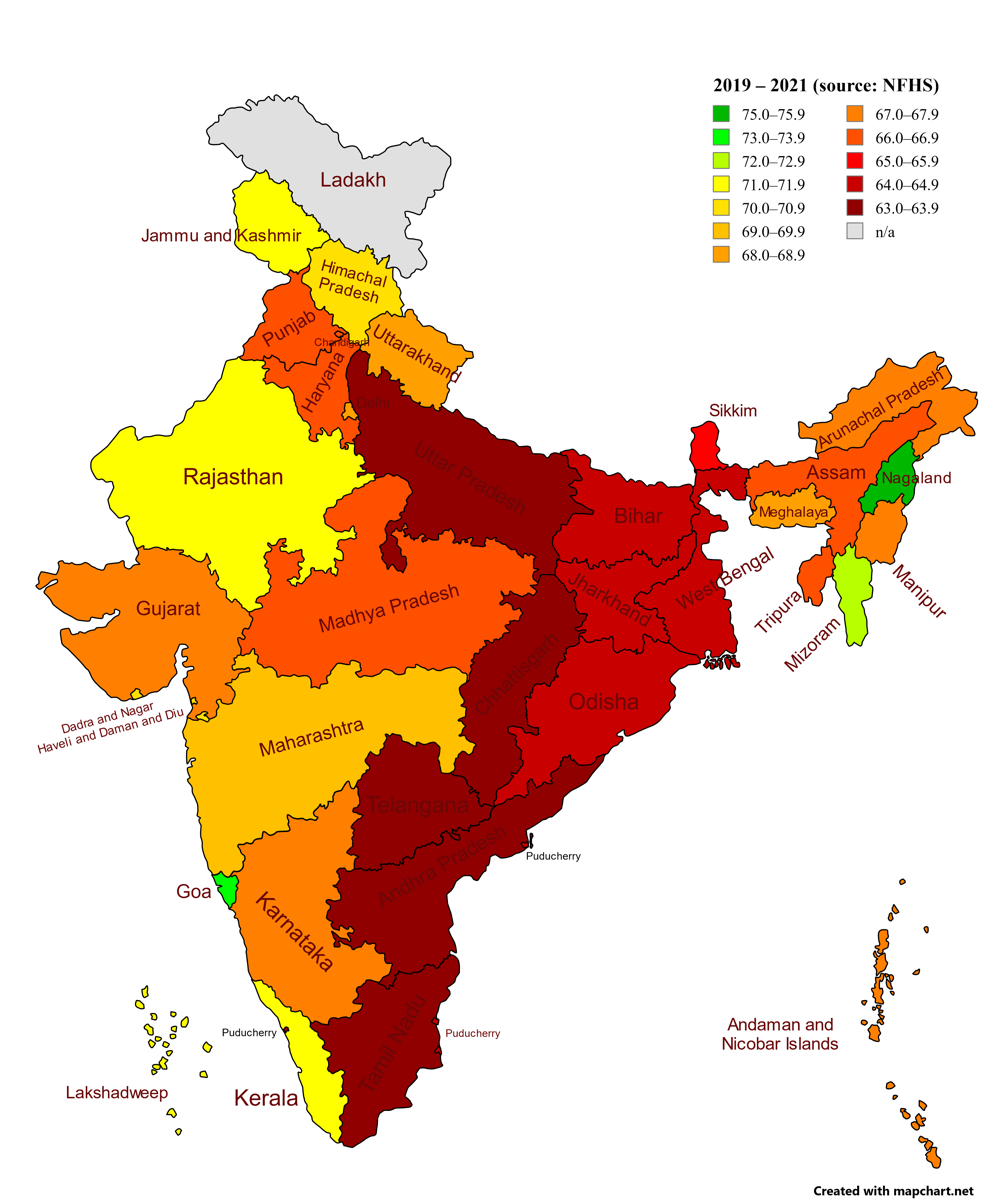
Indian states by life expectancy in 2019—2021, according to estimation of NFHS

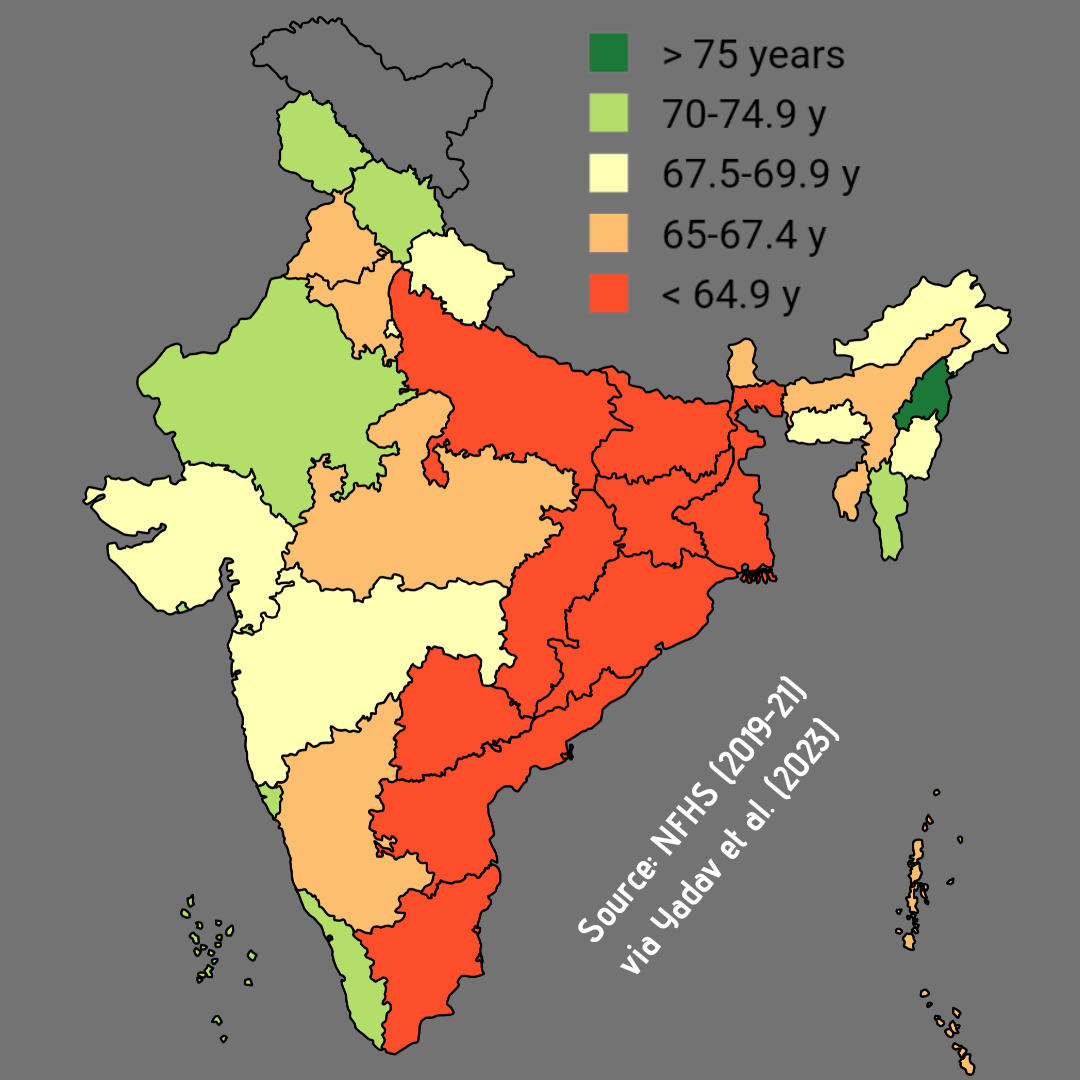
Alternative visualization for 2019—2021, according to NFHS

Data about life expectancy according to alternative survey "National Family Health Survey" (NFHS). These table allow to estimate influence of the COVID-19 pandemic to various Indian territories.

| state | 2015-2016 | | | | change | 2019-2021 | | | |
| state | overall | males | females | F Δ M | change | overall | males | females | F Δ M |
|---|---|---|---|---|---|---|---|---|---|
| India on average | 66.6 | 64.3 | 69.2 | 4.9 | −0.8 | 65.8 | 62.9 | 68.9 | 6.0 |
| Nagaland | 76.2 | 73.0 | 79.8 | 6.8 | −0.8 | 75.4 | 71.5 | 79.9 | 8.4 |
| Kerala | 73.9 | 70.1 | 77.8 | 7.7 | −2.7 | 71.2 | 67.1 | 75.5 | 8.4 |
| Chandigarh | 73.3 | 69.1 | 79.5 | 10.4 | −6.8 | 66.5 | 64.1 | 69.4 | 5.3 |
| Dadra and Nagar Haveli | 73.0 | 73.4 | 72.7 | −0.7 | — | — | — | — | — |
| Mizoram | 72.1 | 66.1 | 81.0 | 14.9 | 0.0 | 72.1 | 66.9 | 78.4 | 11.5 |
| Punjab | 71.1 | 69.0 | 73.5 | 4.5 | −4.9 | 66.2 | 63.3 | 69.4 | 6.1 |
| Himachal Pradesh | 70.8 | 67.5 | 74.3 | 6.8 | −0.2 | 70.6 | 67.9 | 73.2 | 5.3 |
| Maharashtra | 70.2 | 67.9 | 72.8 | 4.9 | −0.9 | 69.3 | 66.4 | 72.4 | 6.0 |
| Rajasthan | 70.2 | 67.3 | 73.4 | 6.1 | 1.3 | 71.5 | 68.1 | 75.4 | 7.3 |
| Manipur | 70.1 | 66.0 | 74.5 | 8.5 | −2.5 | 67.6 | 63.7 | 71.7 | 8.0 |
| Sikkim | 69.8 | 69.4 | 70.7 | 1.3 | −3.9 | 65.9 | 62.7 | 70.2 | 7.5 |
| Goa | 69.7 | 66.1 | 74.0 | 7.9 | 3.6 | 73.3 | 68.7 | 79.1 | 10.4 |
| Jammu and Kashmir | 69.2 | 67.6 | 70.8 | 3.2 | 2.6 | 71.8 | 70.9 | 72.8 | 1.9 |
| Delhi | 69.2 | 66.8 | 73.1 | 6.3 | −1.2 | 68.0 | 65.2 | 71.3 | 6.1 |
| Gujarat | 68.7 | 65.9 | 72.0 | 6.1 | −1.0 | 67.7 | 64.3 | 71.5 | 7.2 |
| Lakshadweep | 68.5 | 65.9 | 71.6 | 5.7 | 2.7 | 71.2 | 66.1 | 76.3 | 10.2 |
| Meghalaya | 68.5 | 65.0 | 72.6 | 7.6 | 0.3 | 68.8 | 66.5 | 71.4 | 4.9 |
| Haryana | 68.4 | 65.8 | 71.9 | 6.1 | −2.4 | 66.0 | 61.9 | 71.0 | 9.1 |
| West Bengal | 68.3 | 67.4 | 69.2 | 1.8 | −3.6 | 64.7 | 63.0 | 66.6 | 3.6 |
| Karnataka | 68.2 | 64.6 | 72.3 | 7.7 | −0.9 | 67.3 | 63.2 | 72.0 | 8.8 |
| Tripura | 67.8 | 64.4 | 71.8 | 7.4 | −1.8 | 66.0 | 63.7 | 68.6 | 4.9 |
| Uttarakhand | 67.6 | 64.1 | 71.6 | 7.5 | 0.7 | 68.3 | 65.4 | 71.4 | 6.0 |
| Andaman and Nicobar Islands | 67.4 | 64.1 | 71.5 | 7.4 | −0.3 | 67.1 | 62.1 | 84.3 (Note: The value looks implausible, but so is stated in the source) | 22.2 |
| Jharkhand | 66.7 | 64.9 | 68.6 | 3.7 | −2.0 | 64.7 | 62.7 | 66.7 | 4.0 |
| Chhattisgarh | 66.4 | 64.6 | 68.3 | 3.7 | −2.6 | 63.8 | 60.8 | 67.0 | 6.2 |
| Puducherry | 66.3 | 60.3 | 73.9 | 13.6 | −1.7 | 64.6 | 59.0 | 70.7 | 11.7 |
| Daman and Diu | 66.2 | 61.7 | 72.5 | 10.8 | — | — | — | — | — |
| Madhya Pradesh | 66.0 | 63.6 | 68.8 | 5.2 | 0.2 | 66.2 | 63.2 | 69.5 | 6.3 |
| Uttar Pradesh | 64.9 | 63.3 | 66.6 | 3.3 | −1.9 | 63.0 | 60.6 | 65.6 | 5.0 |
| Odisha | 64.7 | 63.4 | 66.1 | 2.7 | −0.5 | 64.2 | 61.4 | 67.1 | 5.7 |
| Arunachal Pradesh | 64.6 | 63.0 | 66.5 | 3.5 | 2.9 | 67.5 | 65.0 | 70.2 | 5.2 |
| Andhra Pradesh | 64.2 | 59.9 | 69.2 | 9.3 | −0.8 | 63.4 | 59.6 | 67.8 | 8.2 |
| Tamil Nadu | 63.6 | 60.2 | 67.4 | 7.2 | 0.3 | 63.9 | 59.3 | 69.1 | 9.8 |
| Assam | 63.5 | 61.0 | 66.4 | 5.4 | 2.6 | 66.1 | 63.1 | 69.5 | 6.4 |
| Bihar | 63.0 | 62.0 | 64.0 | 2.0 | 1.4 | 64.4 | 63.3 | 65.4 | 2.1 |
| Telangana | 62.4 | 58.4 | 66.8 | 8.4 | 1.4 | 63.8 | 60.4 | 67.3 | 6.9 |
| Dadra and Nagar Haveli and Daman and Diu | — | — | — | — | — | 70.6 | 67.7 | 76.9 | 9.2 |

Data source: NFHS via Yadav et al.

== Estimations of the Global Data Lab ==
| region | 2023 | | | |
| region | overall | male | female | F∆M |
|---|---|---|---|---|
| India on average | 72.00 | 70.52 | 73.60 | 3.08 |
| Kerala | 78.04 | 76.18 | 80.83 | 4.65 |
| Puducherry | 77.59 | 75.76 | 80.29 | 4.53 |
| Goa | 77.07 | 75.29 | 79.67 | 4.38 |
| Jammu and Kashmir | 76.26 | 74.53 | 78.71 | 4.18 |
| Arunachal Pradesh | 76.15 | 74.43 | 78.58 | 4.15 |
| Andaman and Nicobar Islands | 75.74 | 74.05 | 78.09 | 4.04 |
| Daman and Diu | 75.72 | 74.03 | 78.07 | 4.04 |
| Sikkim | 75.57 | 73.89 | 77.88 | 3.99 |
| Tamil Nadu | 74.98 | 73.34 | 77.18 | 3.84 |
| Chandigarh | 74.69 | 73.07 | 76.84 | 3.77 |
| Maharashtra | 74.53 | 72.92 | 76.65 | 3.73 |
| Manipur | 74.36 | 72.76 | 76.44 | 3.68 |
| Karnataka | 74.27 | 72.67 | 76.33 | 3.66 |
| Lakshadweep | 74.27 | 72.56 | 76.53 | 3.97 |
| Mizoram | 74.21 | 72.62 | 76.26 | 3.64 |
| Nagaland | 74.13 | 72.54 | 76.17 | 3.63 |
| Himachal Pradesh | 74.11 | 72.52 | 76.14 | 3.62 |
| West Bengal | 74.09 | 72.50 | 76.11 | 3.61 |
| New Delhi | 73.77 | 72.20 | 75.72 | 3.52 |
| Telangana | 73.67 | 72.10 | 75.60 | 3.50 |
| Dadra and Nagar Haveli | 73.12 | 71.59 | 74.95 | 3.36 |
| Punjab | 72.91 | 71.39 | 74.70 | 3.31 |
| Gujarat | 72.74 | 71.23 | 74.49 | 3.26 |
| Assam | 72.72 | 71.21 | 74.47 | 3.26 |
| Meghalaya | 72.63 | 71.12 | 74.36 | 3.24 |
| Andhra Pradesh | 72.48 | 70.98 | 74.17 | 3.19 |
| Rajasthan | 72.38 | 70.89 | 74.06 | 3.17 |
| Haryana | 72.31 | 70.82 | 73.97 | 3.15 |
| Uttarakhand | 71.98 | 70.50 | 73.57 | 3.07 |
| Odisha | 71.79 | 70.31 | 73.34 | 3.03 |
| Chhattisgarh | 71.35 | 69.90 | 72.81 | 2.91 |
| Tripura | 71.15 | 69.70 | 72.56 | 2.86 |
| Jharkhand | 71.04 | 69.60 | 72.43 | 2.83 |
| Madhya Pradesh | 70.64 | 69.21 | 71.95 | 2.74 |
| Bihar | 69.78 | 68.38 | 70.89 | 2.51 |
| Uttar Pradesh | 69.57 | 68.18 | 70.64 | 2.46 |

Data source: Global Data Lab

== Other estimations ==
Life expectancy in states and union territories of India, an estimated average for 2011-2016

This is a list of Indian states by life expectancy at birth. The figures come from the Human Development Index Report, published in 2011, by United Nations Development Programme (UNDP) India and Sample Registration Survey (SRS) based life table 2010–14.

The report provides life expectancy at birth based on mortality rates in years 2002–06, 2010–14, 2019, and 2019-21.

| Rank | State | | | Life expectancy at birth | | | |
| Rank | State | 2021 | 2019-21 | 2019 | 2014–17 | 2010–14 | 2002–06 |
|---|---|---|---|---|---|---|---|
| 0 | India | 67.24 | 65.8 | 70.91 | 69 | 68 | 63.5 |
| 1 | Nagaland | 69.84 | 75.4 | 73.65 | - | - | - |
| 2 | Goa | 72.59 | 73.3 | 76.55 | - | - | - |
| 3 | Mizoram | 67.15 | 72.1 | 70.81 | - | - | - |
| 4 | Jammu and Kashmir | 69.56 | 71.8 | 73.36 | 74.1 | 72.6 | - |
| 5 | Rajasthan | 67.13 | 71.5 | 70.80 | 68.5 | 67.7 | 62.0 |
| 6 | Kerala | 74.23 | 71.2 | 78.29 | 74.7 | 69.9 | 64.1 |
| 6 | Lakshadweep | 71.01 | 71.2 | 74.88 | - | - | - |
| 8 | Himachal Pradesh | 69.19 | 70.6 | 72.96 | 72.6 | 71.6 | 67.02 |
| 8 | Daman and Diu | | 70.6 | 74.04 | - | - | - |
| 8 | Dadra and Nagar Haveli | | 70.6 | 73.57 | - | - | - |
| 11 | Maharashtra | 70.6 | 69.3 | 74.46 | 72.5 | 71.6 | 67.2 |
| 12 | Meghalaya | 68.93 | 68.8 | 72.69 | - | - | - |
| 13 | Uttarakhand | 67.66 | 68.3 | 71.35 | 71.7 | 71.7 | 60.0 |
| 14 | Delhi | | 68.0 | 74.19 | 75.2 | 74.9 | 73.8 |
| 15 | Gujarat | 68.44 | 67.7 | 72.18 | 69.7 | 68.7 | - |
| 16 | Manipur | 70.87 | 67.6 | 74.73 | - | - | - |
| 17 | Arunachal Pradesh | 69.87 | 67.5 | 73.68 | - | - | - |
| 18 | Karnataka | 70.5 | 67.3 | 74.34 | 69.2 | 68.8 | 65.3 |
| 19 | Andaman and Nicobar Islands | 73.31 | 67.1 | 77.32 | - | - | - |
| 20 | Chandigarh | 70.71 | 66.5 | 74.57 | - | - | - |
| 21 | Punjab | 69.73 | 66.2 | 73.54 | 72.4 | 71.6 | 69.4 |
| 21 | Madhya Pradesh | 65.05 | 66.2 | 68.60 | 66 | 64.2 | 58.0 |
| 23 | Assam | 66.38 | 66.1 | 70 | 66.2 | 63.9 | 58.9 |
| 24 | Haryana | 69.12 | 66.0 | 72.90 | 69.7 | 68.6 | - |
| 24 | Tripura | 70.25 | 66.0 | 74.08 | - | - | - |
| 26 | Sikkim | 71.04 | 65.9 | 74.92 | - | - | - |
| 27 | West Bengal | 69.48 | 64.7 | 73.27 | 71.2 | 70.2 | 64.9 |
| 27 | Jharkhand | 66.49 | 64.7 | 70.12 | 68.6 | 66.6 | 58.0 |
| 29 | Puducherry | 71.6 | 64.6 | 75.51 | - | - | - |
| 30 | Bihar | 66.3 | 64.4 | 69.92 | 68.9 | 68.1 | 61.6 |
| 31 | Odisha | 66.62 | 64.2 | 70.16 | 68.4 | 65.8 | 59.6 |
| 32 | Tamil Nadu | 71.4 | 63.9 | 75.29 | 71.7 | 70.6 | 66.2 |
| 33 | Telangana | 68.59 | 63.8 | 72.33 | - | - | - |
| 33 | Chhattisgarh | 64.76 | 63.8 | 68.30 | 65.2 | 64.8 | 58.0 |
| 35 | Andhra Pradesh | 67.69 | 63.4 | 71.39 | 69.7 | 68.5 | 64.4 |
| 36 | Uttar Pradesh | 63.39 | 63.0 | 66.85 | 65 | 64.1 | 60.0 |

Data about life expectancy according to a 2024 study by Yadav et al. which estimates district and state-wise life expectancy model-based (Bayesian hierarchical model) using NFHS-5 data on infant mortality rate and life tables showing age-specific mortality rates.

| state | 2019-2021 | | | |
| state | overall | males | females | F Δ M |
|---|---|---|---|---|
| India on average | 73.2 | 71.9 | 74.5 | 2.6 |
| Nagaland | 84.1 | 82.5 | 85.9 | 3.4 |
| Sikkim | 83.0 | 82.8 | 83.2 | 0.4 |
| Tamil Nadu | 81.3 | 80.1 | 82.7 | 2.6 |
| Kerala | 79.9 | 80.1 | 79.7 | -0.4 |
| Goa | 78.7 | 79.0 | 78.3 | -0.7 |
| Puducherry | 78.2 | 78.2 | 78.2 | 0.0 |
| Lakshadweep | 78.2 | 78.2 | 78.2 | 0.0 |
| Karnataka | 75.9 | 73.8 | 78.2 | 4.4 |
| Haryana | 75.8 | 73.2 | 78.7 | 5.5 |
| Punjab | 75.1 | 74.6 | 75.7 | 1.1 |
| Jammu and Kashmir | 75.0 | 75.0 | 75.0 | 0.0 |
| Mizoram | 74.9 | 74.8 | 74.9 | 0.1 |
| Maharashtra | 74.6 | 74.3 | 74.9 | 0.6 |
| Meghalaya | 74.4 | 72.9 | 76.0 | 3.1 |
| Gujarat | 74.3 | 74.0 | 74.7 | 0.7 |
| Himachal Pradesh | 74.2 | 73.9 | 74.5 | 0.6 |
| Arunachal Pradesh | 74.2 | 73.7 | 74.7 | 1.0 |
| Manipur | 74.0 | 71.4 | 76.7 | 5.3 |
| Delhi | 72.4 | 72.6 | 72.3 | -0.3 |
| Uttarakhand | 72.3 | 72.6 | 72.0 | -0.6 |
| Assam | 71.6 | 68.9 | 74.5 | 5.6 |
| Tripura | 71.1 | 69.9 | 72.2 | 2.3 |
| Rajasthan | 70.9 | 65.7 | 76.8 | 11.1 |
| Chhattisgarh | 70.2 | 69.6 | 70.9 | 1.3 |
| Uttar Pradesh | 69.8 | 68.9 | 70.7 | 1.8 |
| Odisha | 69.5 | 68.5 | 70.6 | 2.1 |
| Bihar | 69.3 | 68.5 | 70.3 | 1.8 |
| Telangana | 69.0 | 69.2 | 68.7 | -0.5 |
| Jharkhand | 68.4 | 66.9 | 70.1 | 3.2 |
| West Bengal | 68.1 | 68.0 | 68.1 | 0.1 |
| Madhya Pradesh | 68.1 | 66.7 | 69.6 | 2.9 |
| Chandigarh | 65.9 | 61.9 | 70.7 | 8.8 |
| Andhra Pradesh | 64.8 | 62.2 | 67.7 | 5.5 |
| Andaman and Nicobar Islands | — | — | — | — |
| Dadra and Nagar Haveli and Daman and Diu | — | — | — | — |

Data source: Yadav et al.

== Expectation of life at birth by sex and residence, India ==
| Year | Combined | | | Rural | | | Urban | | |
| Year | Total | Male | Female | Total | Male | Female | Total | Male | Female |
|---|---|---|---|---|---|---|---|---|---|
| 1973 | 49.7 | 50.5 | 49.0 | 48.0 | 48.9 | 47.1 | 58.9 | 58.8 | 59.2 |
| 1978 | 52.3 | 52.5 | 52.1 | 50.6 | 51.0 | 50.3 | 60.1 | 59.6 | 60.8 |
| 1983 | 55.4 | 55.4 | 55.7 | 53.7 | 54.0 | 53.6 | 62.8 | 61.6 | 64.1 |
| 1988 | 57.7 | 57.7 | 58.1 | 56.1 | 56.1 | 56.2 | 63.4 | 62.0 | 64.9 |
| 1989 | 58.3 | 58.1 | 58.6 | 56.8 | 56.7 | 56.9 | 63.8 | 62.3 | 65.3 |
| 1990 | 58.7 | 58.6 | 59.0 | 57.4 | 57.2 | 57.4 | 64.1 | 62.8 | 65.5 |
| 1991 | 59.4 | 59.0 | 59.7 | 58.0 | 57.9 | 58.1 | 64.9 | 63.5 | 66.3 |
| 1992 | 60.0 | 59.4 | 60.4 | 58.6 | 58.2 | 58.7 | 65.4 | 64.1 | 66.7 |
| 1993 | 60.3 | 59.7 | 60.9 | 58.9 | 58.5 | 59.3 | 65.9 | 64.5 | 67.3 |
| 1994 | 60.7 | 60.1 | 61.4 | 59.4 | 58.9 | 59.8 | 66.3 | 64.9 | 67.7 |
| 1995 | 61.1 | 60.4 | 61.8 | 59.9 | 59.3 | 60.2 | 66.6 | 65.1 | 68.0 |
| 1996 | 61.4 | 60.6 | 62.2 | 60.1 | 59.5 | 60.5 | 66.8 | 65.3 | 68.2 |
| 1997 | 61.5 | 60.8 | 62.3 | 60.3 | 59.7 | 60.9 | 66.4 | 65.1 | 67.9 |
| 1998 | 61.9 | 61.2 | 62.7 | 60.7 | 60.1 | 61.3 | 66.7 | 65.4 | 68.3 |
| 1999 | 62.3 | 61.4 | 63.3 | 61.1 | 60.3 | 61.9 | 67.1 | 65.7 | 68.7 |
| 2000 | 62.9 | 61.9 | 64.0 | 61.6 | 60.7 | 62.5 | 67.6 | 66.1 | 69.2 |
| 2001 | 63.4 | 62.3 | 64.6 | 62.2 | 61.1 | 63.2 | 68.0 | 66.5 | 69.7 |
| 2002 | 63.9 | 62.8 | 65.2 | 62.7 | 61.6 | 63.8 | 68.4 | 66.9 | 70.0 |
| 2003 | 64.3 | 63.1 | 65.6 | 63.0 | 61.9 | 64.2 | 68.6 | 67.2 | 70.3 |
| 2004 | 64.7 | 63.5 | 66.1 | 63.5 | 62.3 | 64.7 | 68.9 | 67.4 | 70.6 |
| 2005 | 65.0 | 63.7 | 66.5 | 63.8 | 62.6 | 65.2 | 69.0 | 67.5 | 70.7 |
| 2006 | 65.4 | 64.0 | 66.9 | 64.2 | 62.9 | 65.7 | 69.0 | 67.5 | 70.8 |
| 2007 | 65.7 | 64.3 | 67.2 | 64.5 | 63.2 | 66.0 | 69.2 | 67.6 | 71.0 |
| 2008 | 66.1 | 64.6 | 67.7 | 64.9 | 63.5 | 66.5 | 69.6 | 68.0 | 71.4 |
| 2009 | 66.5 | 64.9 | 68.2 | 65.3 | 63.8 | 67.0 | 70.1 | 68.4 | 71.9 |
| 2010 | 67.0 | 65.4 | 68.8 | 65.8 | 64.2 | 67.6 | 70.6 | 69.0 | 72.4 |
| 2011 | 67.5 | 65.8 | 69.3 | 66.3 | 64.6 | 68.1 | 71.2 | 69.6 | 73.0 |
| 2012 | 67.9 | 66.4 | 69.6 | 66.7 | 65.1 | 68.4 | 71.5 | 70.0 | 73.5 |

== Charts ==
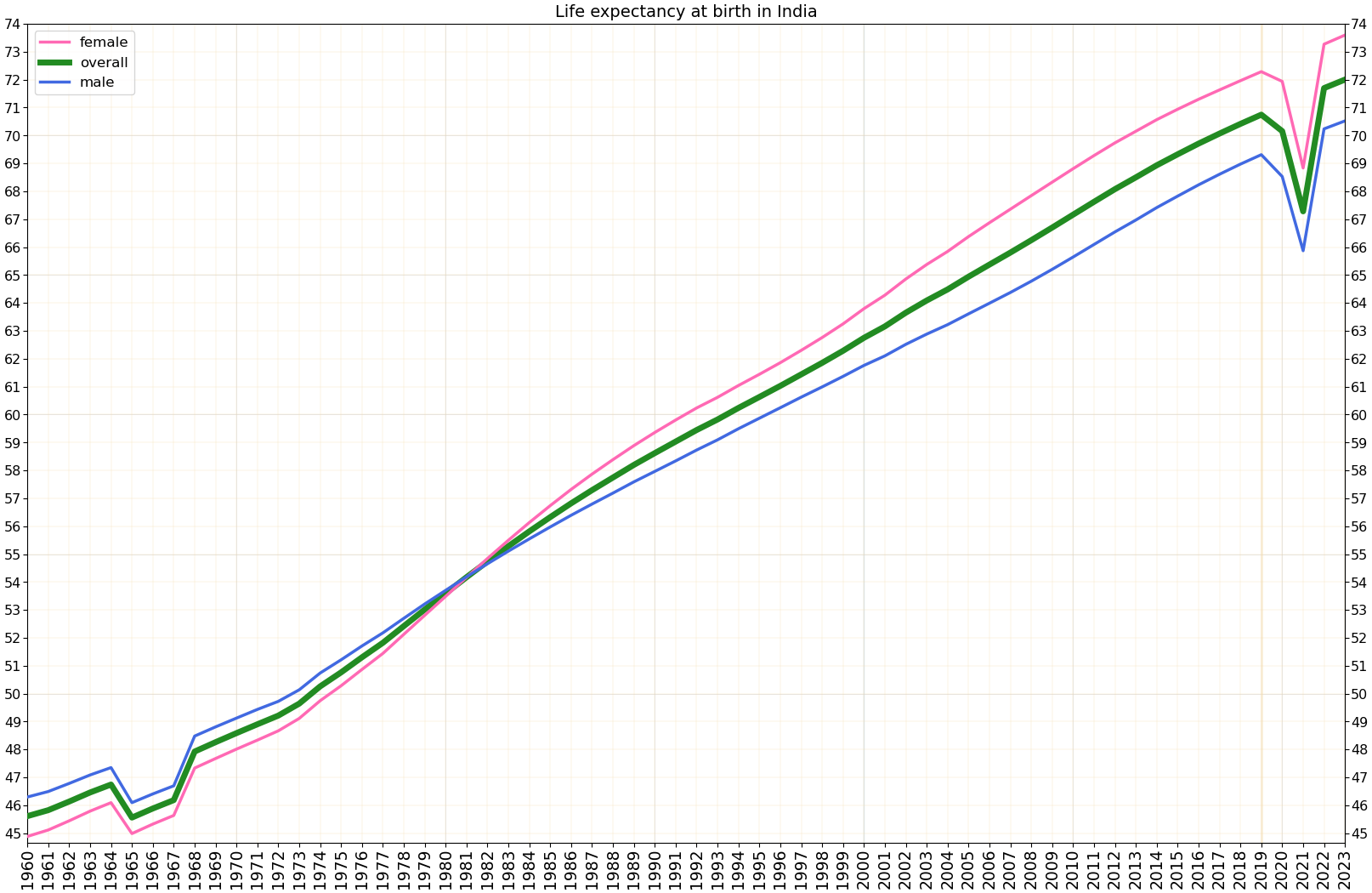
Development of life expectancy in India according to estimation of the World Bank Group

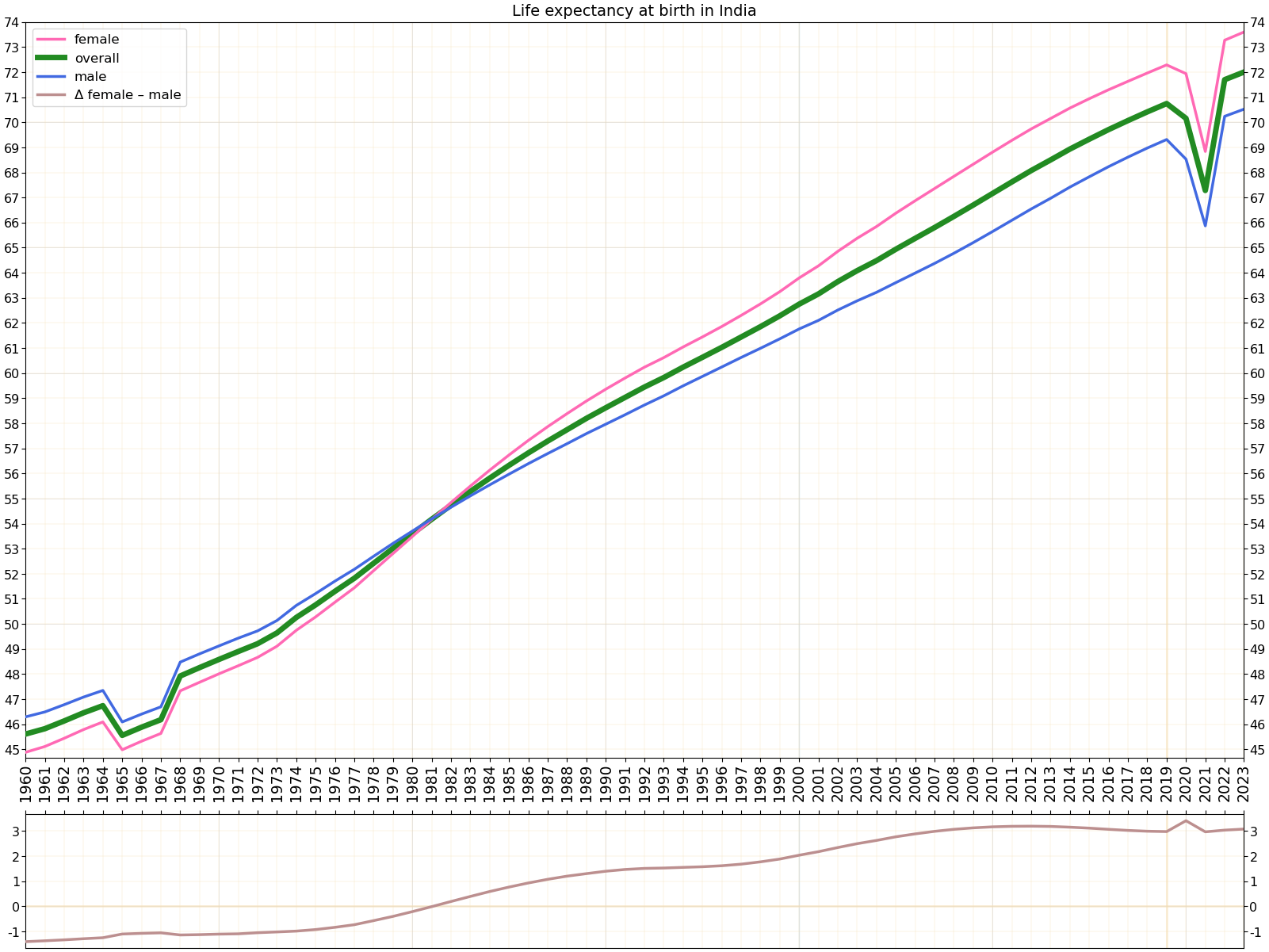
Life expectancy with calculated sex gap

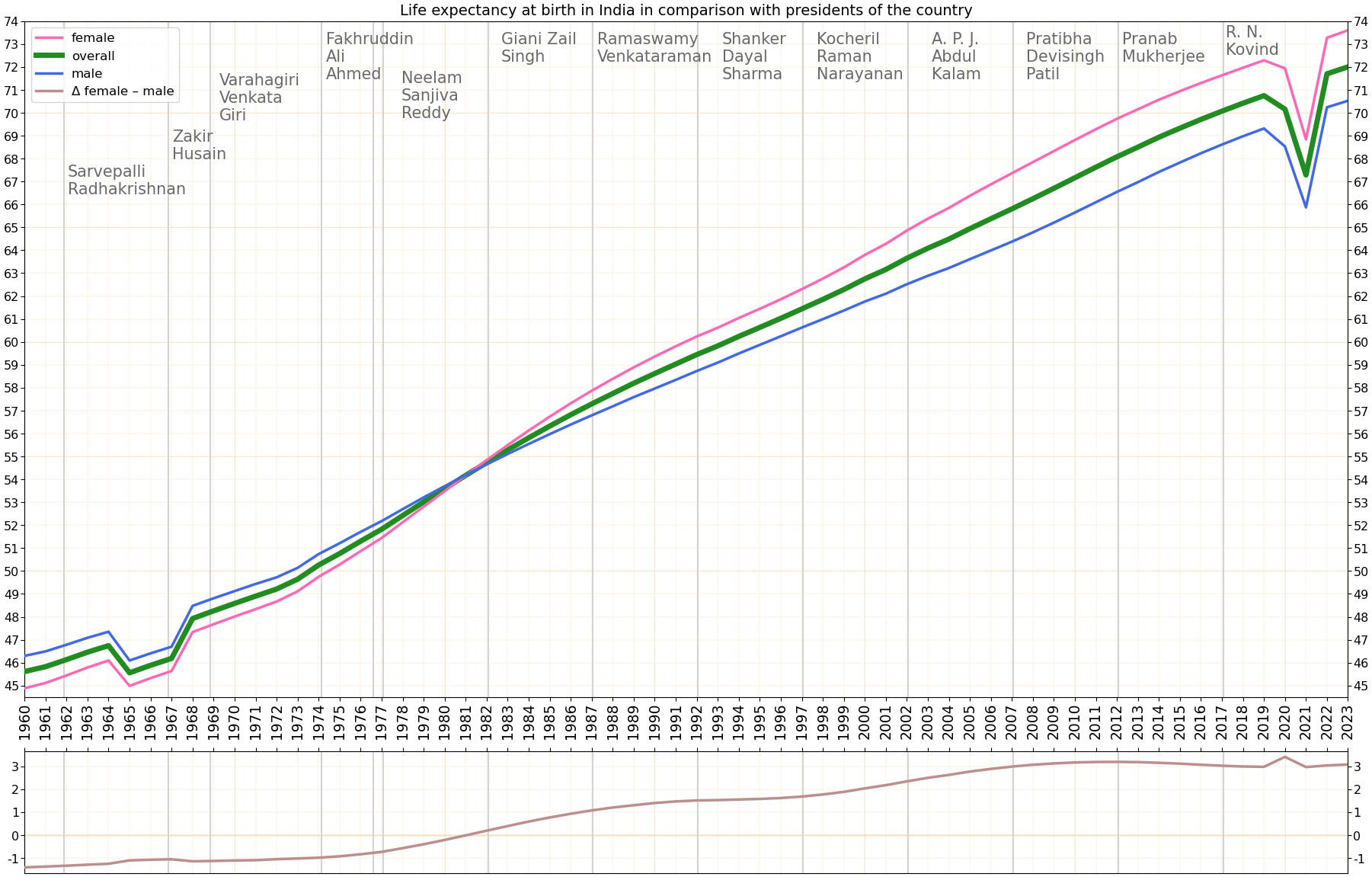
Life expectancy in comparison to president of the country

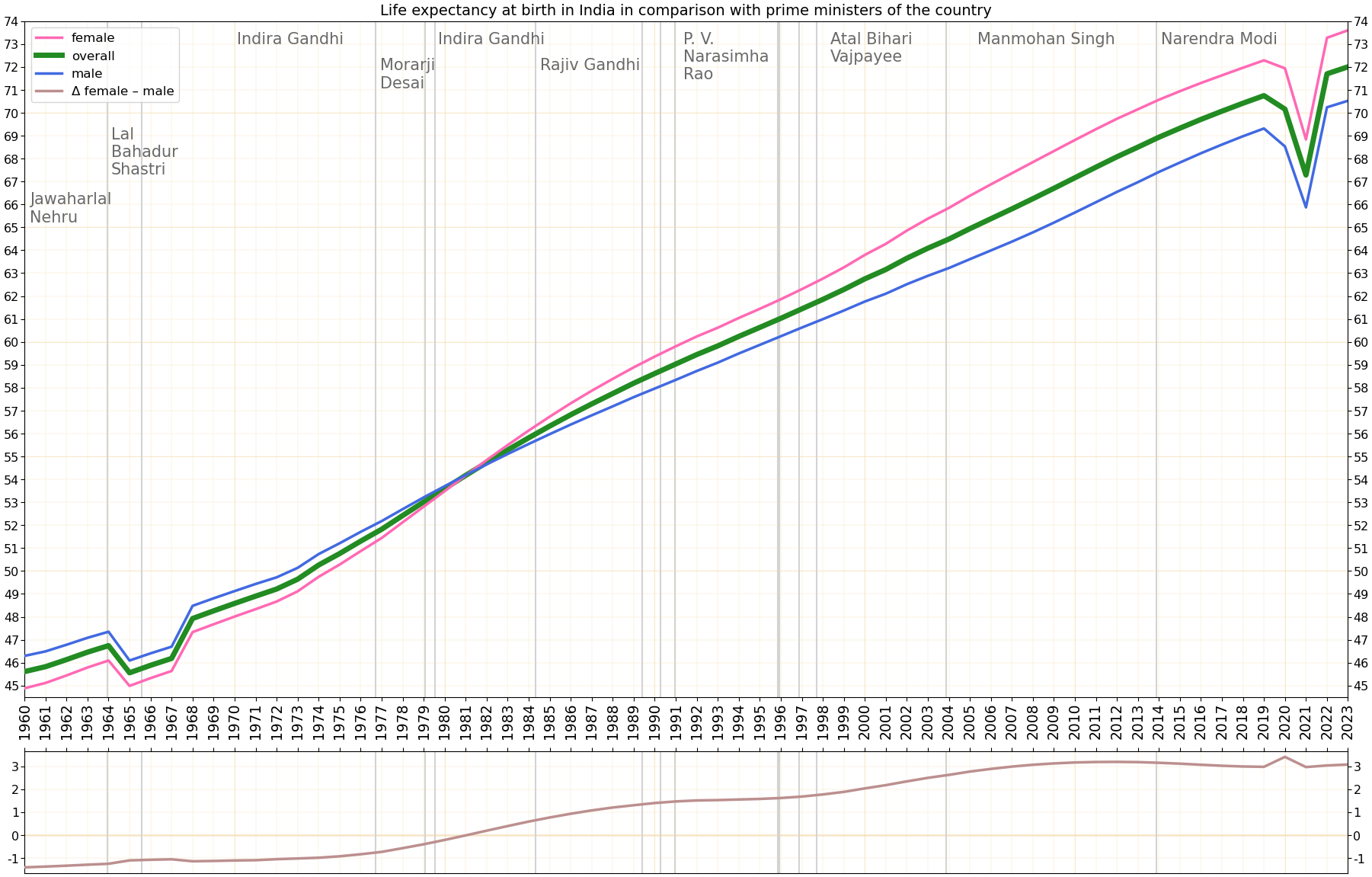
Life expectancy in comparison to prime minister of the country

Life expectancy in India according to estimation of Our World in Data

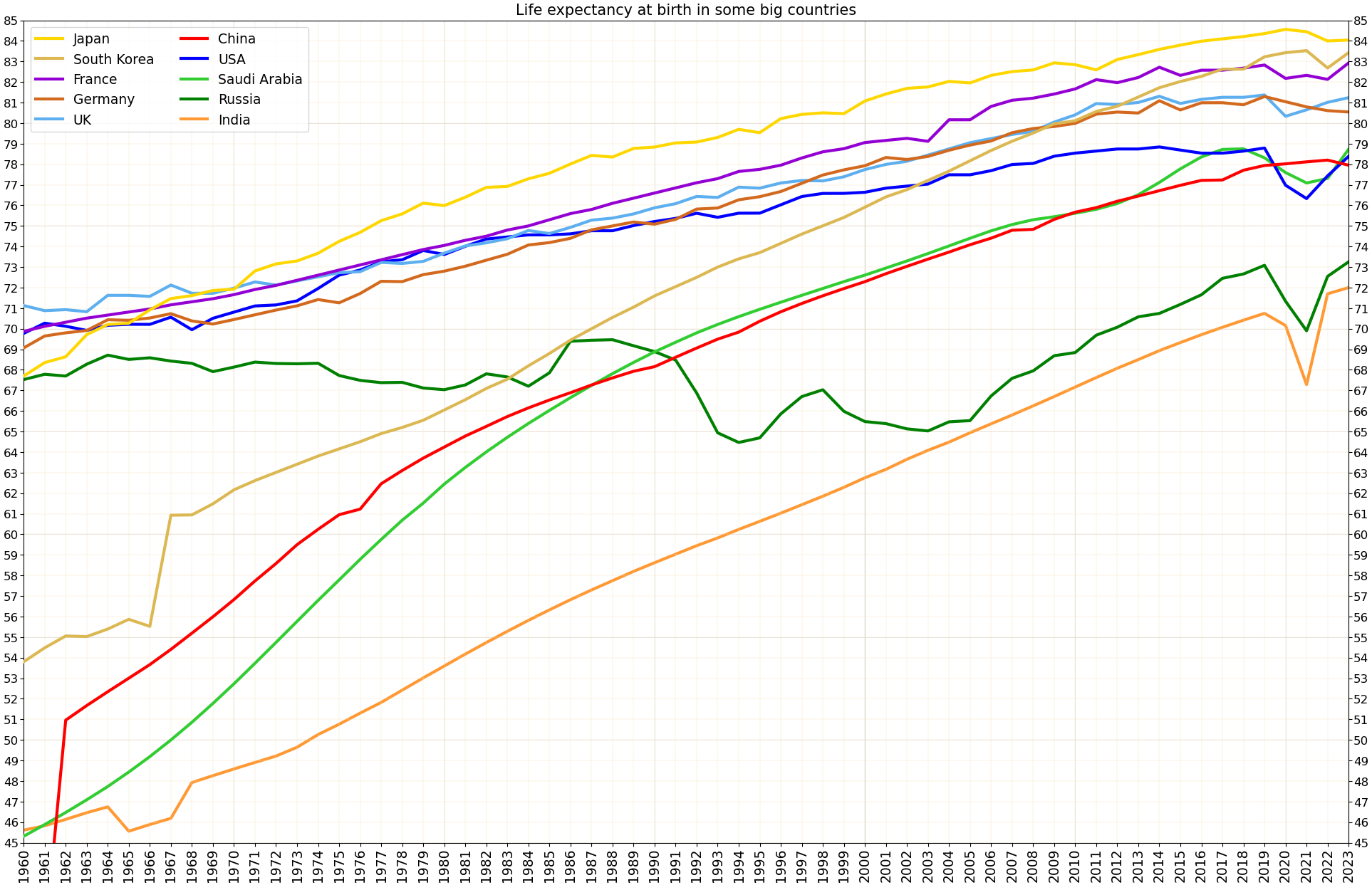
Development of life expectancy in India in comparison to some big countries of the world

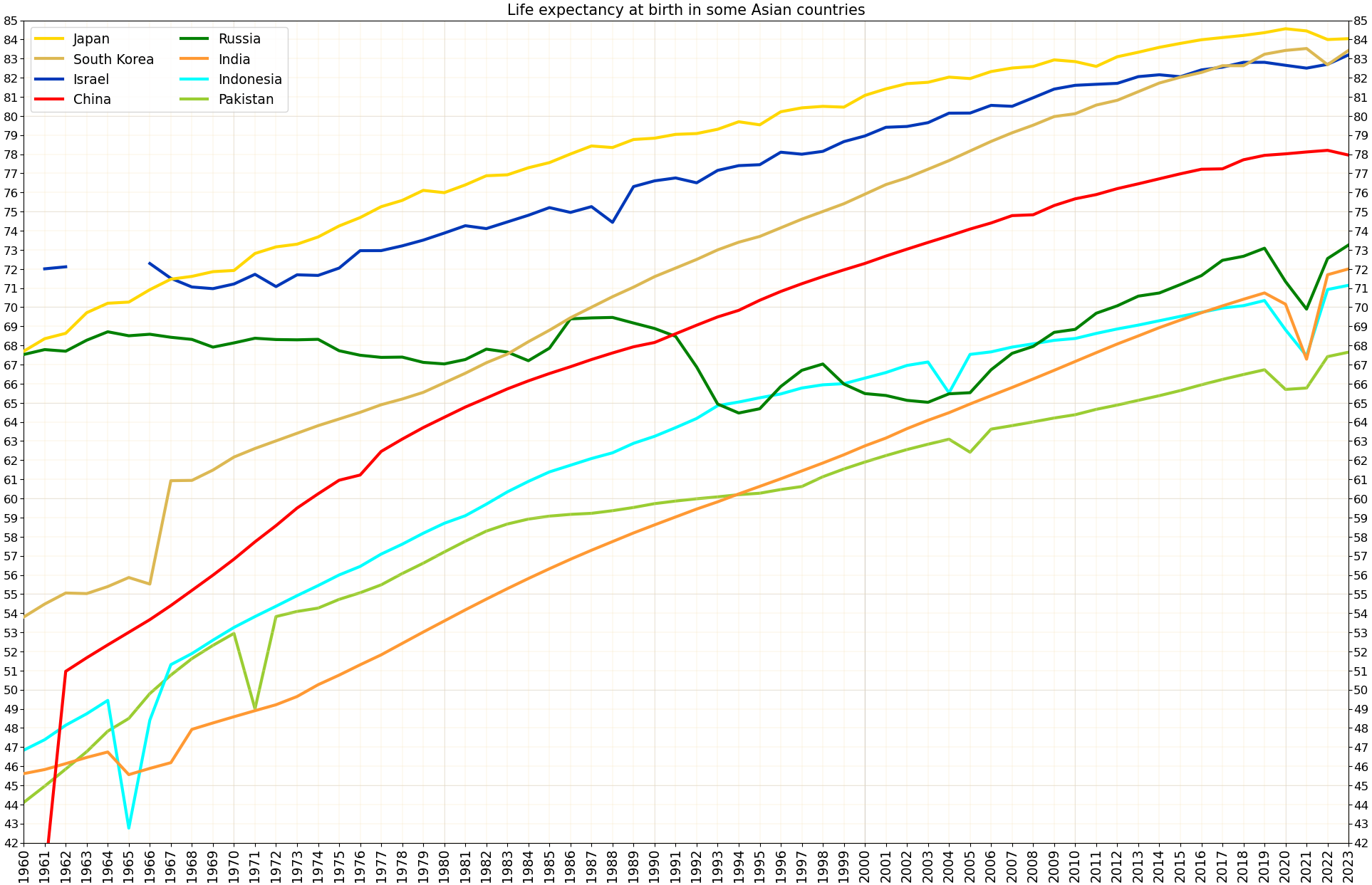
Development of life expectancy in India in comparison to other big countries of Asia

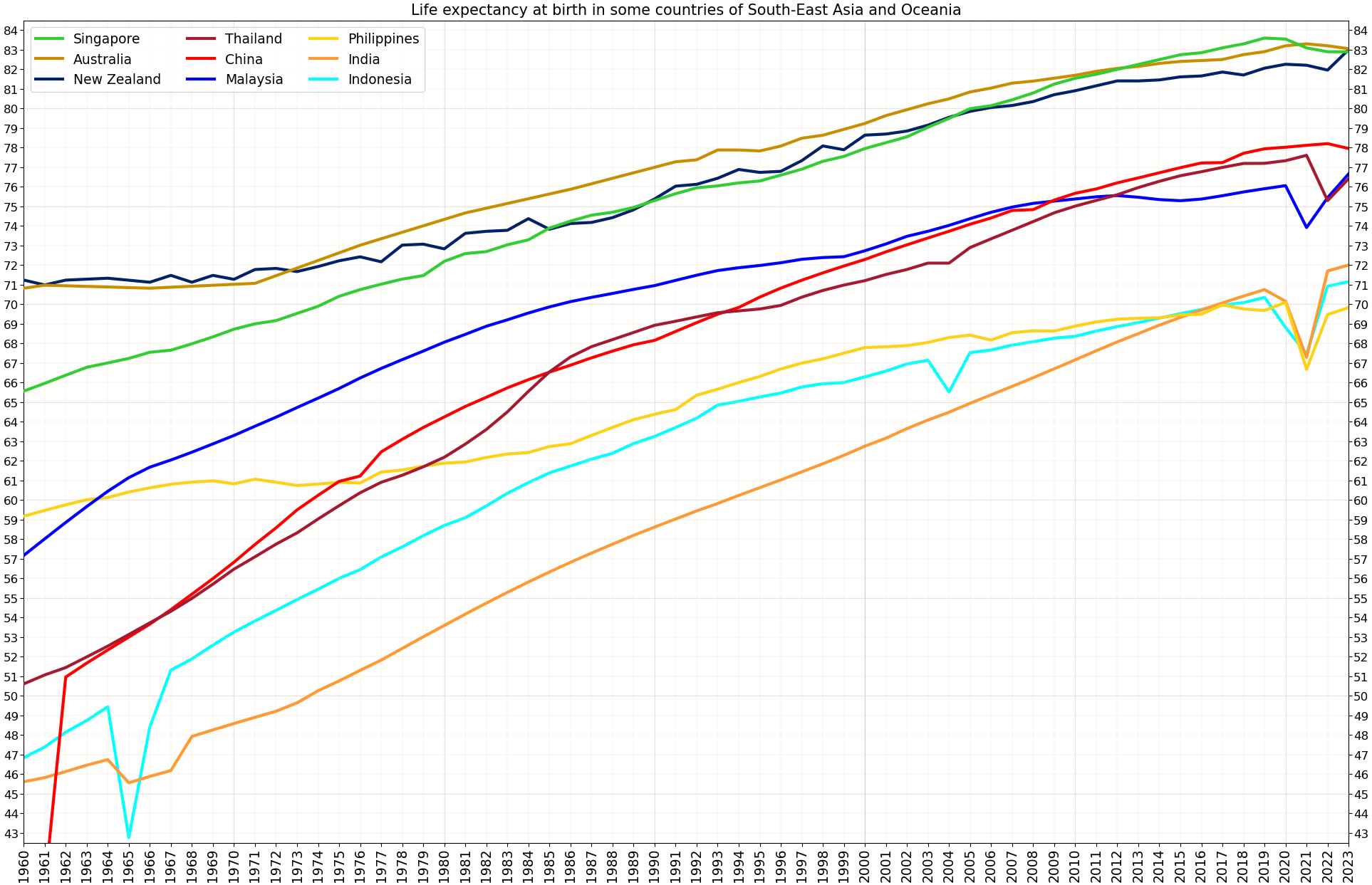
Development of life expectancy in India in comparison to some countries of South-East Asia and Oceania
Life expectancy and healthy life expectancy in India on the background of other countries of the world in 2019

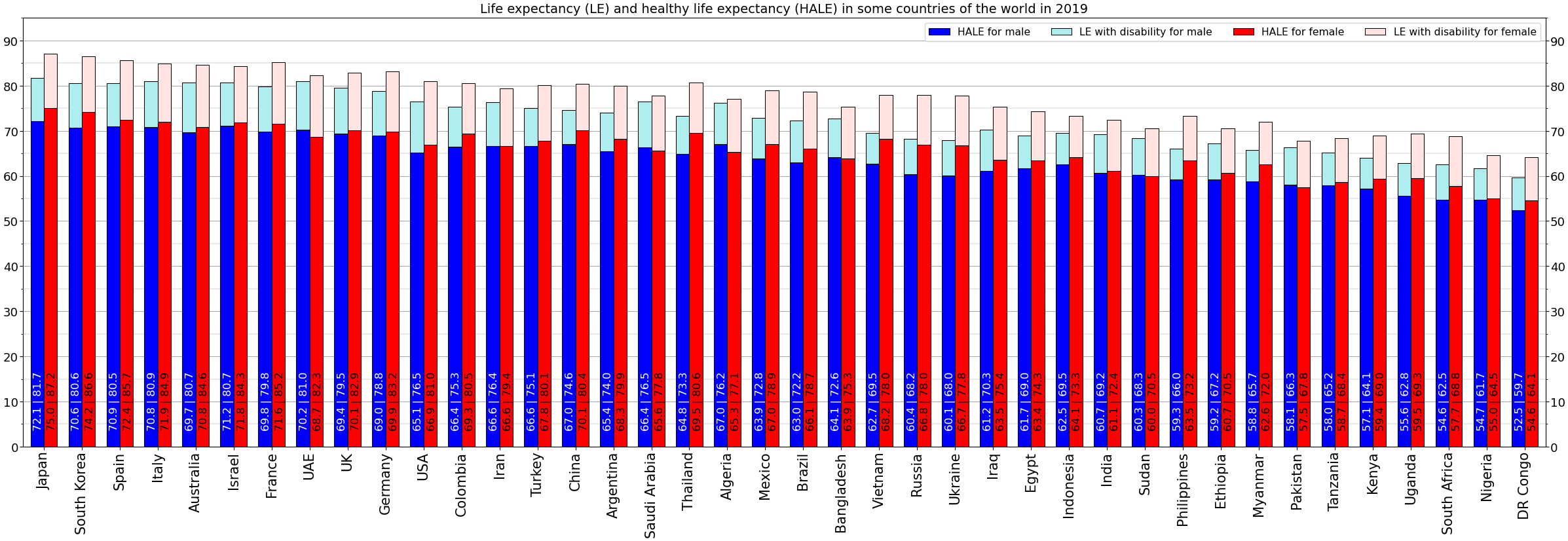
Life expectancy and healthy life expectancy for males and females separately
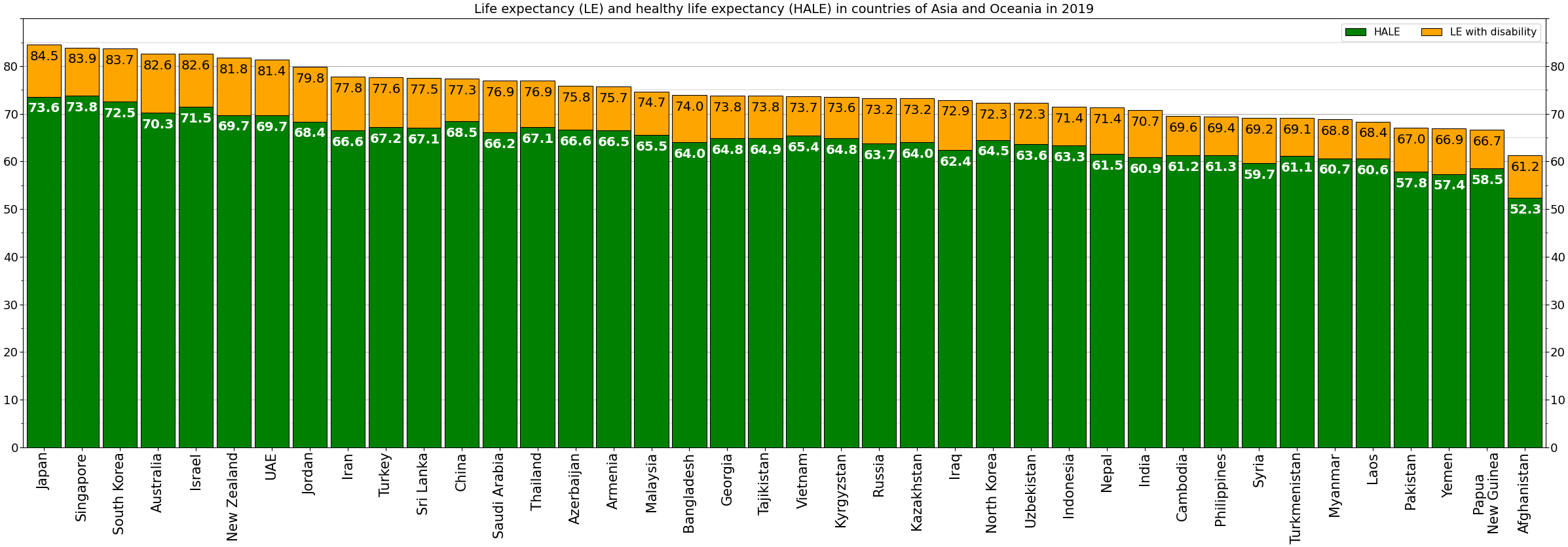
Life expectancy and healthy life expectancy in India on the background of countries of Asia and Oceania in 2019

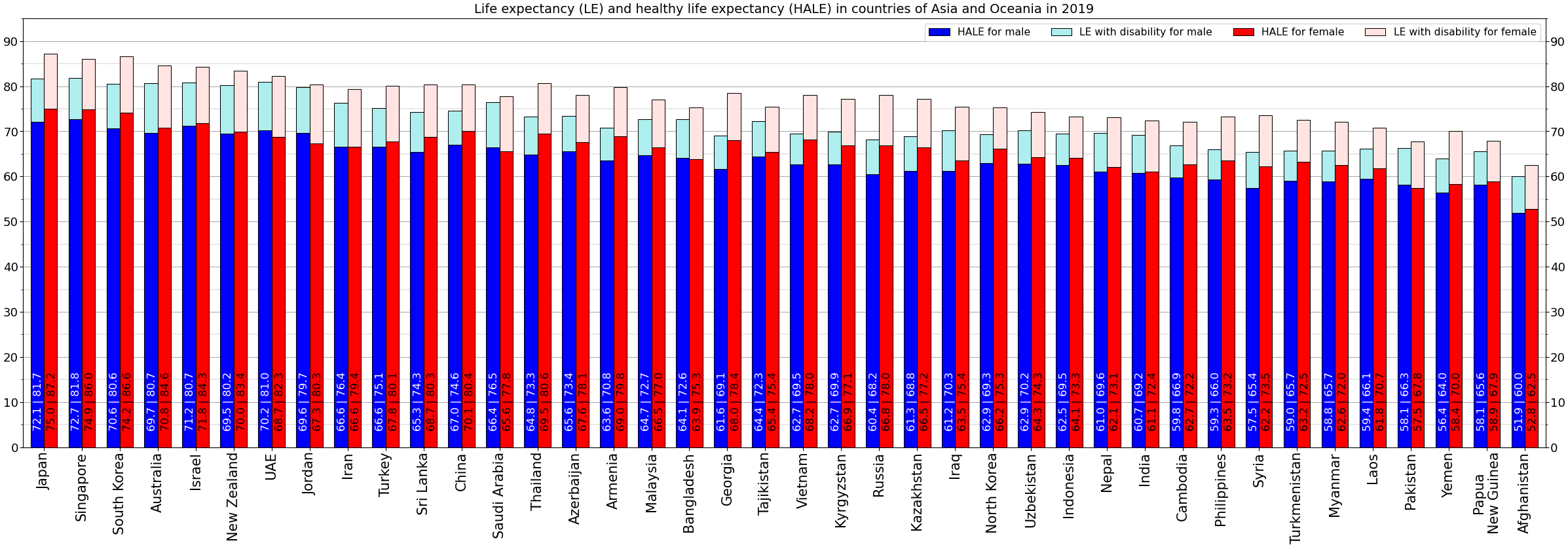
Life expectancy and healthy life expectancy for males and females separately

== See also ==
- List of countries by life expectancy
- List of Asian countries by life expectancy
- Demographics of India
