= Brooke Shearer =

American journalist and political aide

Brooke Lloyd Shearer
- Born: 28 July 1950; Culver City, California
- Died: 19 May 2009 (aged 58); Washington, D.C.
- Education: Stanford University
- Occupations: Private investigator and journalist
- Spouse: Strobe Talbott (1971–2009)

Brooke Lloyd Shearer (July 28, 1950 – May 19, 2009) was an American private investigator, journalist, employee of the U.S. Department of the Interior, aide to Hillary Clinton, and wife of long-time Brookings Institution president Strobe Talbott.

== Life ==
Shearer was born on July 28, 1950, in Culver City, California. Her father was gossip columnist Lloyd Shearer, and her mother was Marva Peterson. She had an older brother, Derek, and a twin brother, Cody. Her father's parents had immigrated from Austria. She spent her childhood in Los Angeles.

She attended Stanford University for undergraduate studies in history and the English language. In 1971, she graduated with a bachelor's degree and married Strobe Talbott, who was the roommate of her brother Derek Shearer.

Shearer had two sons, Adrian and Devin, and at the time of her death she had one granddaughter. She died from cancer at her Washington, D.C., residence on May 19, 2009.

== Career ==
Shearer wrote stories for The Christian Science Monitor and the British publication The Sunday Times while in Eastern Europe. Talbott was reporting for Time in the same region. Brooke Shearer began assisting Sylvia Porter after she and her husband moved to Washington, D.C. in 1974. She served as a spokesperson for the Credit Union National Association in the 1980s. Brooke Shearer had worked as a private investigator for a period. She used the alias Connecticut Walker when writing stories for Parade.

During the 1992 United States presidential election, Shearer was an aide to Hillary Clinton. When Bill Clinton became president of the United States in 1993 Shearer was put in charge of the White House Fellows. Shearer was an employee in the U.S. Department of the Interior during the second term of the Clinton administration. She became the first director of the Yale World Fellows program at Yale University after she and her husband moved to New Haven, Connecticut, in 2001. Later she served as the head of the International Center for Research on Women.
