= Mobilize.org =

American non-profit organization

- Founded: 2002; 24 years ago
- Founder: David Smith
- Type: Non-profit organization (IRS exemption status): 501(c)(3)
- Purpose: Millennials
- Location: 1029 Vermont Ave NW, Washington, DC
- Region served: United States
- Key people: David Smith, founder; Maya Enista-Smith, CEO; Justin Rockefeller, former board member
- Employees: 7
- Website: www.mobilize.org
- Formerly called: Mobilizing America's Youth (2002–2007)

Mobilize.org is a non-partisan American non-profit organization that works with and for Millennials. The stated mission of Mobilize.org is to empower and invest in Millennials to create and implement solutions to social problems.

== History ==
Mobilize.org was founded in 2002 on the campus of University of California, Berkeley by David Smith, a Berkeley senior, as Mobilizing America's Youth.

On the morning of March 11, 2002, Smith and a group of 110 students from the Berkeley student government staged a protest in Sacramento over University of California tuition and housing fees. The meetings resulted in a stay on student fees and a $15 million housing bond for low-income student housing which the University matched for a total of $30 million. This day is now known in UC Berkeley history as "Cal Lobby Day".

Some of the students who participated in Cal Lobby Day founded Mobilizing America's Youth, now known as Mobilize.org.

The organization is now led by CEO Maya Enista-Smith.

== Democracy 2.0 ==
At its Democracy 2.0 Summits, Mobilize.org convenes Millennials to choose projects that receive financial investments and expert support from Mobilize.org and its partners to be implemented on college campuses, in communities or online.

=== Democracy 2.0 Award Summits and Winners ===
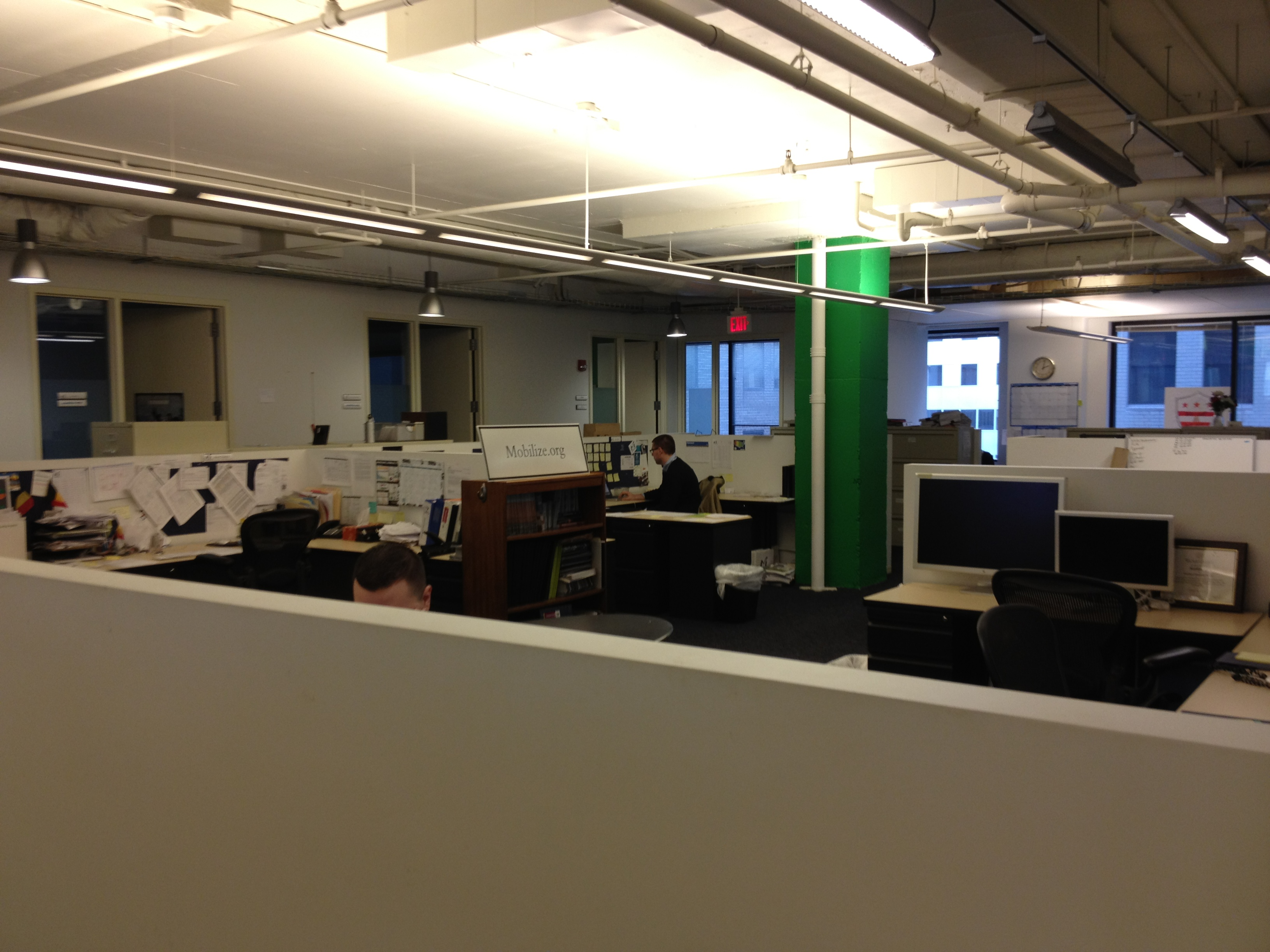
The former Mobilize.org office.

Past Mobilize.org Democracy 2.0 Award Summits include: 80 Millions Strong, Beyond the Welcome Home, Outdoor Nation, Millennial Return on Investment, and Target 2020 (North Carolina). During each Democracy 2.0 Summit, five projects are awarded Democracy 2.0 Awards. Winning projects include, myImpact.org, Team Rubicon, and The One Percent Foundation.

== Acquisitions ==
In January 2010, Mobilize.org acquired the assets of GenerationEngage, a nonpartisan, youth civic engagement organization founded in 2004. GenerationEngage co-founder and former program director, Justin Rockefeller, is a former member of the Mobilize.org Board of Directors.

Additionally, the company has also acquired YouthNoise and Sparkseed over the years.
