= Lloyd Shearer =

American celebrity gossip columnist

Lloyd "Skip" Shearer (December 20, 1916 – May 27, 2001) was an American celebrity gossip columnist. From 1958 to 1991, he wrote "Walter Scott's Personality Parade" in Parade magazine. In this column he used the name Walter Scott, and discussed rumors about celebrities using a question-and-answer style. Shearer also wrote profiles of famous people under his real name.

== Career ==
Shearer began writing in high school. He attended the University of North Carolina at Chapel Hill, and in 1936 he graduated with a bachelor's degree in the English language. His first job was for the Durham Sun in North Carolina. In 1941, Shearer was drafted into the Army. When the military magazine Yank was established, Shearer joined the staff in New York City. Later, he was transferred to Los Angeles where he wrote for Armed Forces Radio, as part of the Pacific Theater division. He also became a correspondent for The New York Times while still serving in the Army and after serving, until 1953. Then he became the West Coast correspondent of Parade, then starting his "Walter Scott's Personality Parade" column in 1958. Shearer retired from writing the column in 1991, due to Parkinson's disease.

== Life ==
Shearer was born in New York City on December 20, 1916. Shearer's parents had immigrated from Austria, and his father worked as a typesetter. The neighborhood where Shearer was raised was described as "working class".

Shearer married fellow writer, Marva Peterson. They had three children: Derek, a former U.S. Ambassador to Finland, and twins Cody and Brooke. Lloyd Shearer died of a heart attack at his Los Angeles home on Thursday May 27, 2001.

Shearer was mentioned in the 1942 best-selling book about a journalist's experiences in military service, See Here Private Hargrove. From that exposure Shearer was said to have "gained some notoriety".
