= National Family Health Survey =

Government-sponsored cohort study/survey

The National Family Health Survey (NFHS) is an India-wide survey conducted by the Ministry of Health and Family Welfare, Government of India, with the International Institute for Population Sciences serving as the nodal agency. The NFHS is one of the global surveys conducted by the United States Agency for International Development (USAID) through its Demographic and Health Survey (DHS) program.

== History ==
In 1992–93, the first round of the National Family Health Survey was conducted in three phases. The main objective of the survey was to collect reliable and up-to-date information on fertility, family planning, mortality, and maternal and child health. Subsequently, three other rounds were conducted between 1998 and 2016.

The latest survey is NFHS 5, which started in 2019. However, the survey was stalled amid the COVID-19 associated lockdown. Eventually, the NFHS-5 findings were released in December 2020. Based on these findings, the ministry has set up a technical expert group to improve indicators pertaining to Malnutrition, Stunting, Anaemia, and C-Section.

== List of surveys ==
- National Family Health Survey-1 (1992–93)
- National Family Health Survey-2 (1998–99)
- National Family Health Survey-3 (2005-2006)
- National Family Health Survey-4 (2015-2016)
- National Family Health Survey-5 (2019-2021)
- National Family Health Survey-6 (2023-2024) (latest)

== Homepage ==
- http://rchiips.org/nfhsnew/nfhsuser/index.php
