= Derek Shearer =

American diplomat

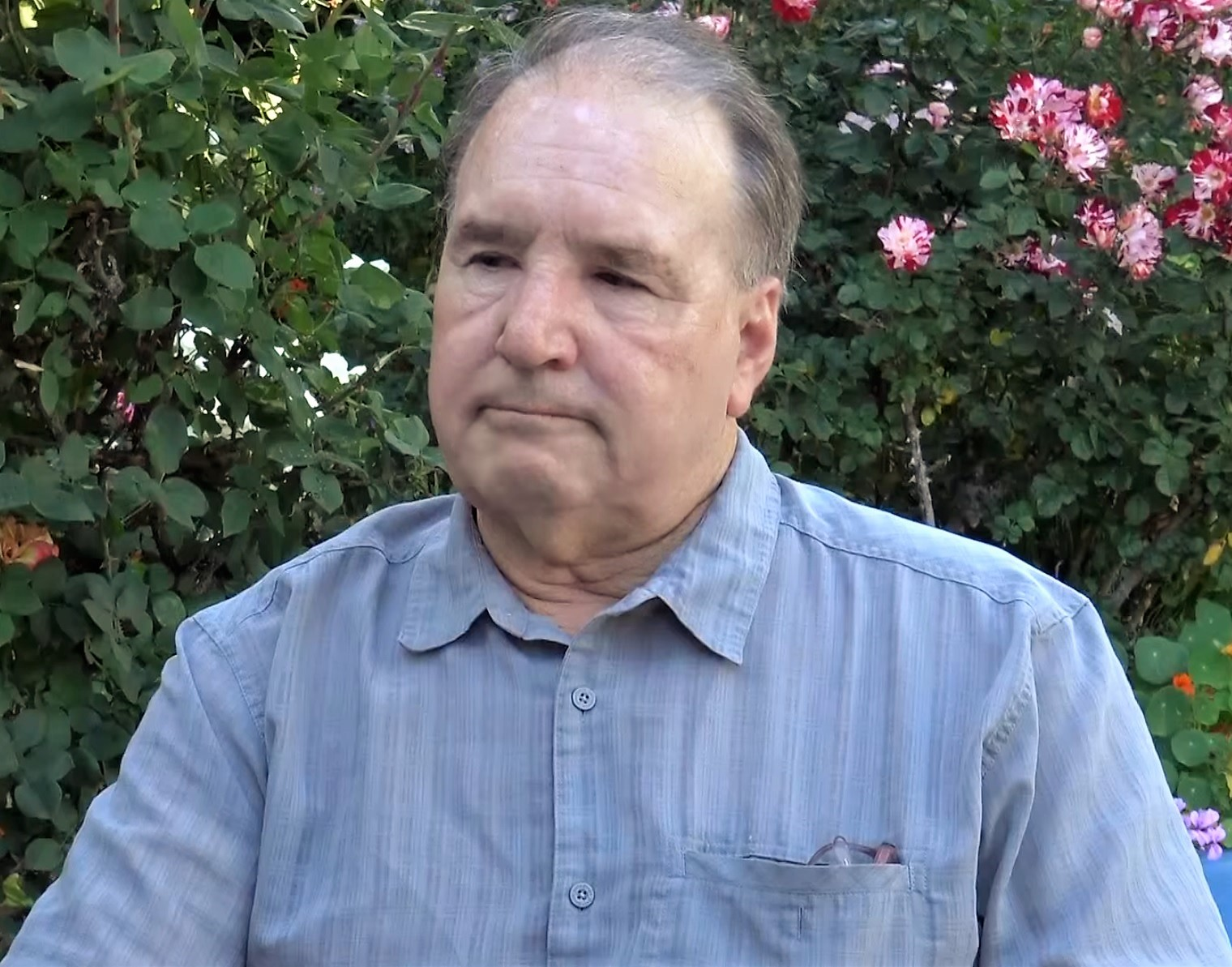
- Shearer speaks at The Nexus Institute in 2016

United States Ambassador to Finland
- In office July 1, 1994 – October 31, 1997
- President: Bill Clinton
- Preceded by: John Hubert Kelly
- Succeeded by: Eric S. Edelman

Personal details
- Born: December 5, 1946 Los Angeles, California, U.S.
- Spouse: Sue Toigo
- Education: Yale University (BA); Union Graduate School (Ph.D)

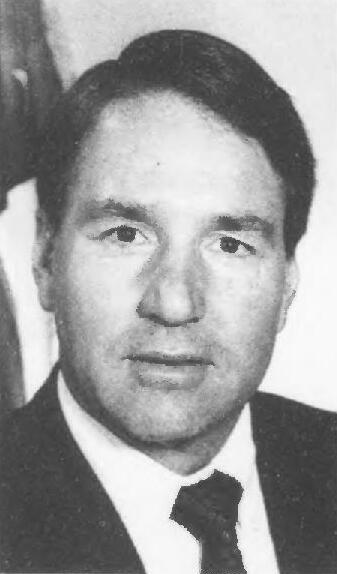
Shearer (c. 1994)

Derek Shearer (born December 5, 1946) is an American former diplomat who served as the United States Ambassador to Finland. He is currently employed by Occidental College, directing the McKinnon Center for Global Affairs and serving as a Chevalier Professor of Diplomacy and World Affairs.

== Life and career ==
Shearer was born in Los Angeles on December 5, 1946. He received a bachelor's degree from Yale University. His roommate at Yale was Strobe Talbott. Shearer received a doctoral degree from the Union Graduate School.

Shearer co-authored the 1981 book Economic Democracy: The Challenge of the 1980's with Martin Carnoy.

Shearer held his ambassador post from 1994 through 1997, and before that served in the United States Department of Commerce.

He is the son of gossip columnist Lloyd Shearer. He has a younger brother, Cody, and a sister, Brooke. The parents of his father had immigrated from Austria. His roommate Talbott married his sister Brooke. Shearer was married to Ruth Yannatta Goldway, who had served as the mayor of Santa Monica, California.

As of 2009, Derek Shearer lives in the Pacific Palisades community of Los Angeles with his wife, Sue Toigo, a financial consultant.

Diplomatic posts
Preceded by John Hubert Kelly	United States Ambassador to Finland; 1994–1997	Succeeded by Eric S. Edelman
