= International Center for Research on Women =

International non-profit organization

- Abbreviation: ICRW
- Formation: 1976
- Type: Research Institute
- Headquarters: 1120 20th Street NW, 500 North
- Location: Washington, D.C.
- Interim President and CEO: Ann Warner
- Revenue: $10,814,543 (2022)
- Website: www.icrw.org

The International Center for Research on Women (ICRW) is a non-profit organization with offices located in Washington, D.C., United States, New Delhi, Ranchi, and Jamtara, India, Nairobi, Kenya, and Kampala, Uganda. ICRW works to promote gender equity, inclusion and shared prosperity within the field of international development.

== Focus areas ==
ICRW’s work centers on four issue areas: economic opportunity and security, health and reproductive rights, social norms and power dynamics, and climate action.

The organization’s research identifies women's contributions to their communities and the barriers – like HIV, violence, and lack of education – that prevent them from being economically stable and able to fully participate in society. It focuses on three paths of action to achieve this:

- Designing concrete, evidence-based plans for program designers, donors and policymakers that empower women to control their lives and help shape the future of their communities;
- Measuring changes in the lives of women and girls – as well as men and boys – to know how best to achieve gender equality; and
- Recommending policy priorities that give women opportunities to transform their lives.

ICRW is primarily a research institution whose strong quantitative and qualitative research contributes to the direct action of organizations and communities in which they work. By empowering local researchers, activists, and practitioners, the organization aims to recalibrate power dynamics and foster inclusive ecosystems.

The ICRW website provides access to thousands of research reports, books, fact sheets, and policy briefs as well as toolkits and trainer's guides.

== Leadership ==
Ann Warner was named as interim CEO and President, effective October 2, 2023.

Warner was most recently the founding CEO for WREN, a nonprofit organization advancing the health, economic well-being, and rights of South Carolina’s women, girls, and their families, for eight years. From 2008 to 2015, Ann held several leadership positions at the International Center for Research on Women. She led research initiatives on child marriage in Kenya and India, consulted with implementation partners on how to address child marriage in their programs, and authored the report More Power to Her: How Empowering Girls Can Help End Child Marriage. She has worked closely with policymakers and coalition allies at the local, state, national, and global levels to advocate for increased investments in empowering women and girls. Ann also served as the organization’s first Special Assistant to the President under Geeta Rao Gupta and has also served as Co-Chair of the US national chapter of Girls Not Brides: Global Partnership to End Child Marriage.

Warner has conducted research on violence against women and girls in the West African nation of Liberia in collaboration with the International Rescue Committee, as well as built support for humanitarian relief and development programs around the world through CARE USA.

Ann received her BA from Wellesley College, and has a masters from Columbia University’s School of International and Public Affairs and the School of Public Health.

Previous Presidents include:

- Peggy Clark (2021-2023)
- Dr. Sarah Degnan Kambou (2010-2021)
- Ambassador Geeta Rao Gupta (1997-2010)
- Mayra Buvinic, Founding President (1976-1997)

Ravi Verma is the director of ICRW's Asia Regional Office, and Evelyne Opondo directs its Africa Regional Office.

== Board of directors ==
ICRW has been directed by several renowned and well-recognized individuals within the field of international development as well as other key private sector and government individuals, including Nobel Laureate Amartya Sen, writer Ann Crittenden, and Brooke Shearer (deceased, May 19, 2009), spouse of Strobe Talbott, director of the Brookings Institution.

The board of directors as of 2023:

- Tara Abrahams, Chair, Global
- Luciana Aquino-Hagedorn, Co-Vice Chair, Global
- Agnes Binagwaho
- Agnes Igoye
- Dominick Mjartan
- Firoza Mehrotra
- Haven Ley
- Jacqueline Asiimwe
- Lois Romano
- Julie Katzman (Emerita)

=== Regional Board Members ===
- Anne Nkutu, Uganda
- Fred Muhumuza, Uganda
- Moses Mulumba, Uganda
- Baroness Mary Goudie, United Kingdom
- Guy Oliver, United Kingdom
- Dave Jongeneelen, The Netherlands
- Naila Kabeer, United Kingdom
- Prajna Khanna, Chair, The Netherlands
- Surya Ramkumar, The Netherlands

Leadership Council

- Ashley Judd
- Cherie Blair
- Dr. Amartya Sen
- Gayle Tzemach Lemmon
- Her Majesty Queen Rania Al Abdullah
- Joanna Breyer
- Joanne Leedom-Ackerman
- Susan Berresford
- Pat Mitchell
- Winnie Byanyima
- Baroness Goudie
- Leena Nair
- Judy Woodruff
- Her Highness Sheikha Shamma bint Sultan bin Khalifa Al Nahyan

== Annual events and lectures ==
Mariam K. Chamberlain Dissertation Award

Through a $100,000 matching grant from the Ford Foundation, ICRW established the Mariam K. Chamberlain Dissertation Award to honor and extend Dr. Chamberlain’s vision to launch university and college-based centers and freestanding policy institutes focused on women’s issues. The award creates an opportunity for first-generation doctoral students, including immigrant students, to continue working on a dissertation under the close supervision of a senior dissertation advisor over an academic year.

Paula Kantor Award for Excellence in Field Research

Created in memory of Dr. Paula Kantor, this annual award recognizes exceptional achievement in the fields of gender and women's empowerment. The award is presented to a young female researcher from a low- or middle-income country.

Champions for Change Award

For over a decade, the Champions for Change Awards have celebrated gender equity and recognized leaders who are working towards a better world. These awards honor individuals who have made strides in promoting the rights and well-being of women and girls.
