= Indré Rockefeller =

American businesswoman

Indrė Rockefeller
- Born: Indrė Maria Vengris; October 28, 1980 (age 45); Washington, D.C., U.S.
- Education: Princeton University (AB); Stanford University (MBA); Columbia University (MA)
- Occupations: Businesswoman, environmentalist
- Spouse: Justin Rockefeller (m. 2006)
- Children: 2
- Family: Rockefeller family (by marriage)

Indrė Maria Rockefeller (née Vengris; born October 28, 1980) is an American businesswoman, environmentalist and fashion executive. She manages the ready-to-wear clothing company Delpozo and founded the sustainable luggage start-up Paravel. Through her marriage to Justin Rockefeller, she is a member of the Rockefeller family.

== Early life and education ==
Rockefeller was born Indré Vengris on October 28, 1980, in Washington, D.C., to Lithuanian-born Vitolis Enrikas Vengris, a veterinarian, and Virginia K. Vengris (née Konce).

Her father was born into an academic family in Dotnuva, Kėdainiai, in Lithuania. He completed his veterinary studies in Lithuania and emigrated to the United States with his mother to join his father, Jonas Vengris (1909-2004), who had been in the U.S. since 1949 and taught as full professor at the University of Massachusetts, Amherst. Vengris' father became a naturalized U.S. citizen in 1973.

She joined The Washington Ballet aged 17. Rockefeller holds a Bachelor of Arts (AB) in art history, criticism and conservation from Princeton University and a Master of Business Administration from Stanford University. In May 2023, Rockefeller graduated with a Master of Arts in environmental studies from Columbia University.

== Career ==
In 2009, Rockefeller worked as First Assistant to the Editor-in-Chief of Vogue in New York City. After another year at ModeWalk, Inc. in Palo Alto, California, she joined Moda Operandi, where she served as the creative director until 2014, when she became the US president of Delpozo (Jesús del Pozo), a Spanish luxury brand. In 2015, she and Andy Krantz founded Paravel, a sustainable luggage brand. Rockefeller is a member of the Young Fellows Steering Committee of the Frick Collection.

== Personal life ==
She married Justin Rockefeller, son of Jay and Sharon Percy Rockefeller, in 2006. They have two daughters and reside in New York City.
