= Strobe Talbott =

American foreign policy analyst

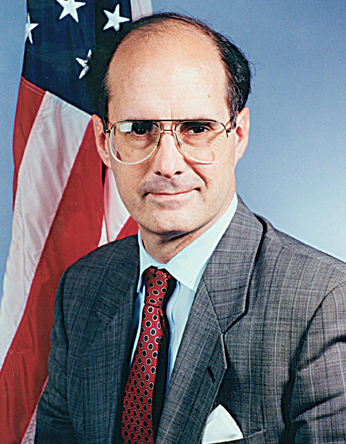

12th United States Deputy Secretary of State
- In office February 23, 1994 – January 19, 2001
- President: Bill Clinton
- Preceded by: Clifton R. Wharton Jr.
- Succeeded by: Richard Armitage

President of the Brookings Institution
- In office July 1, 2002 – November 6, 2017
- Preceded by: Michael Armacost
- Succeeded by: John R. Allen

Personal details
- Born: Nelson Strobridge Talbott III; April 25, 1946 (age 80) Dayton, Ohio, U.S.
- Party: Democratic
- Spouse: Brooke Shearer (m. 1971; died 2009) Barbara Lazear Ascher (m. 2015)
- Education: Yale University (BA); Magdalen College, Oxford (MLitt)

Nelson Strobridge Talbott III (born April 25, 1946) is an American foreign policy analyst focused on Russia. He was associated with Time magazine, and a diplomat who served as the deputy secretary of state from 1994 to 2001. He was president of Brookings Institution from 2002 to 2017.

== Early life and education ==
Talbott was born in Dayton, Ohio, to Helen Josephine (Large) and Nelson Strobridge "Bud" Talbott II. His grandfather was football player and coach Bud Talbott. He attended the Hotchkiss School in Connecticut and graduated in 1968 from Yale University, where he had been chairman of the Yale Daily News. He was awarded Yale's Alpheus Henry Snow Prize. He was also a member of the Scholar of the House program in 1967–68, belonged to a society of juniors and seniors called Saint Anthony Hall, and was elected to the exclusive Elizabethan Club. Talbott became a friend of future President Bill Clinton when both were Rhodes Scholars at the University of Oxford; during his studies there he translated Nikita Khrushchev's memoirs into English.

== Career ==
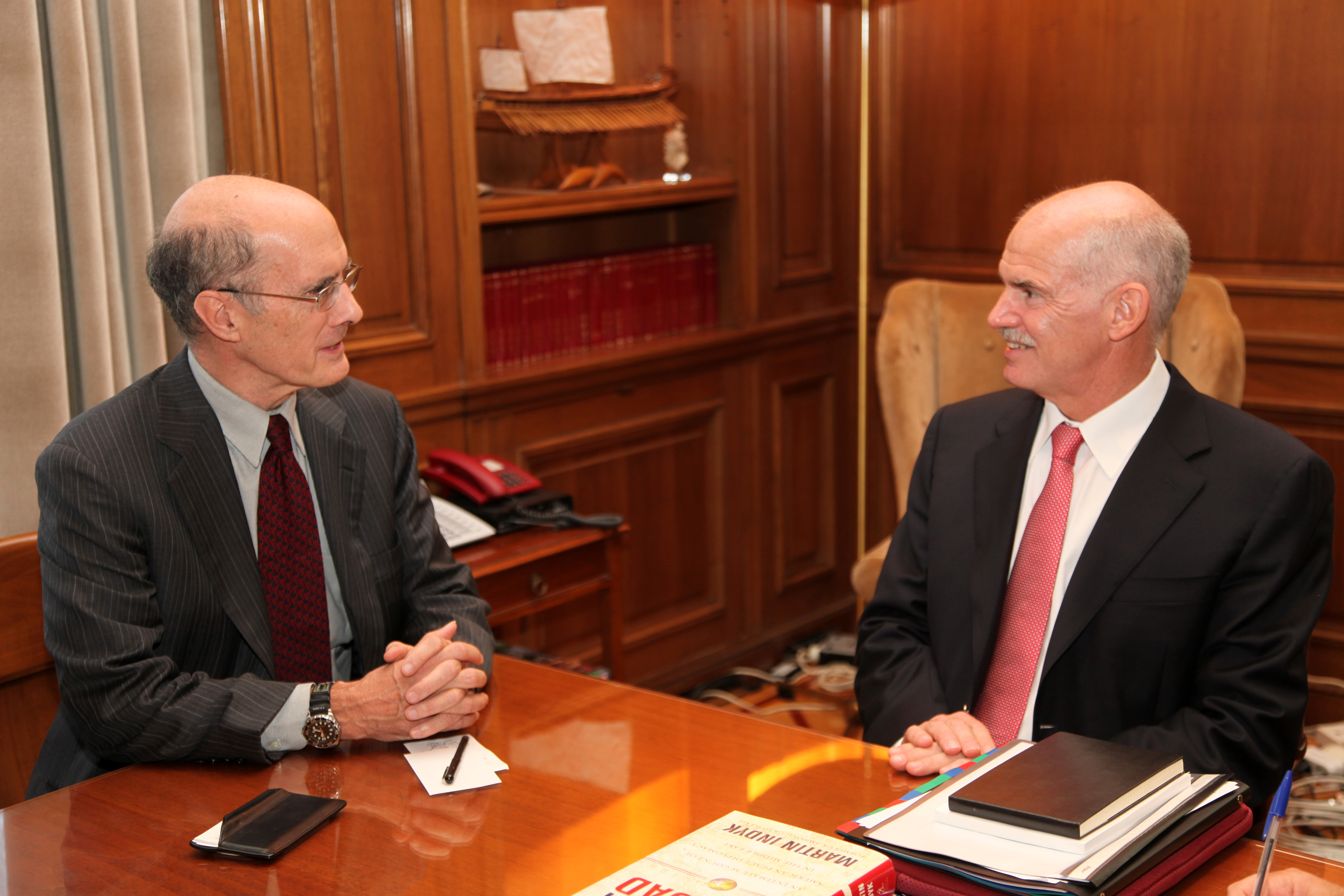
Talbott with George Papandreou, Prime Minister of Greece, 2009

In 1972, Talbott, along with fellow Rhodes Scholar Robert Reich and friend David E. Kendall, rallied their friends Bill and Hillary Clinton to help the Texas campaign to elect George McGovern as president of the United States. In the 1980s, he was Time's principal correspondent on Soviet-American relations, and his work for the magazine was cited in the three Overseas Press Club Awards won by Time in the 1980s. Talbott also wrote several books on disarmament. He translated and edited Khrushchev Remembers: The Last Testament (2 volumes, 1974) by Nikita S. Khrushchev.

Following Bill Clinton's election as president, Talbott served in the U.S. government. He was appointed Ambassador-at-Large and Special Adviser to the Secretary of State Warren Christopher on the New Independent States from 1993 to 1994, to mitigate the consequences of the Soviet breakup. He was then appointed to the second highest ranking position in the U.S. State Department as deputy secretary of state from 1994 to 2001. In that role, he made efforts to synchronize U.S. policy towards Eastern Europe with Germany, France, the U.K., and with George Soros. After leaving government, he was briefly the Director of the Yale Center for the Study of Globalization.

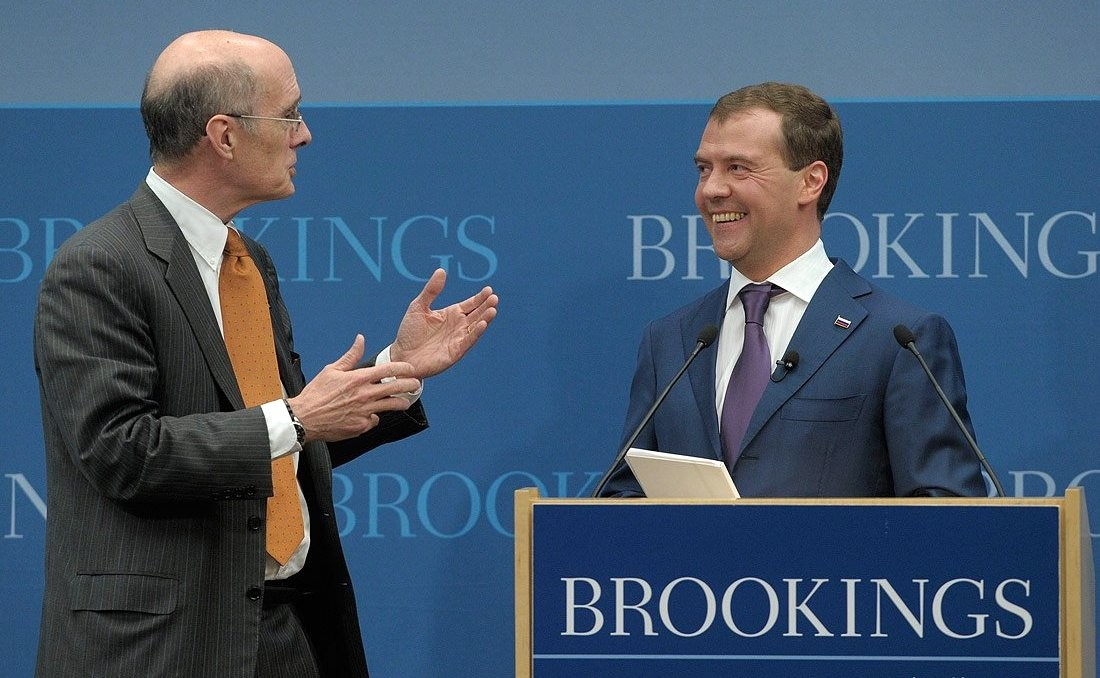
Talbott with Russian president Dmitry Medvedev while the latter was on a visit to the United States in April 2010

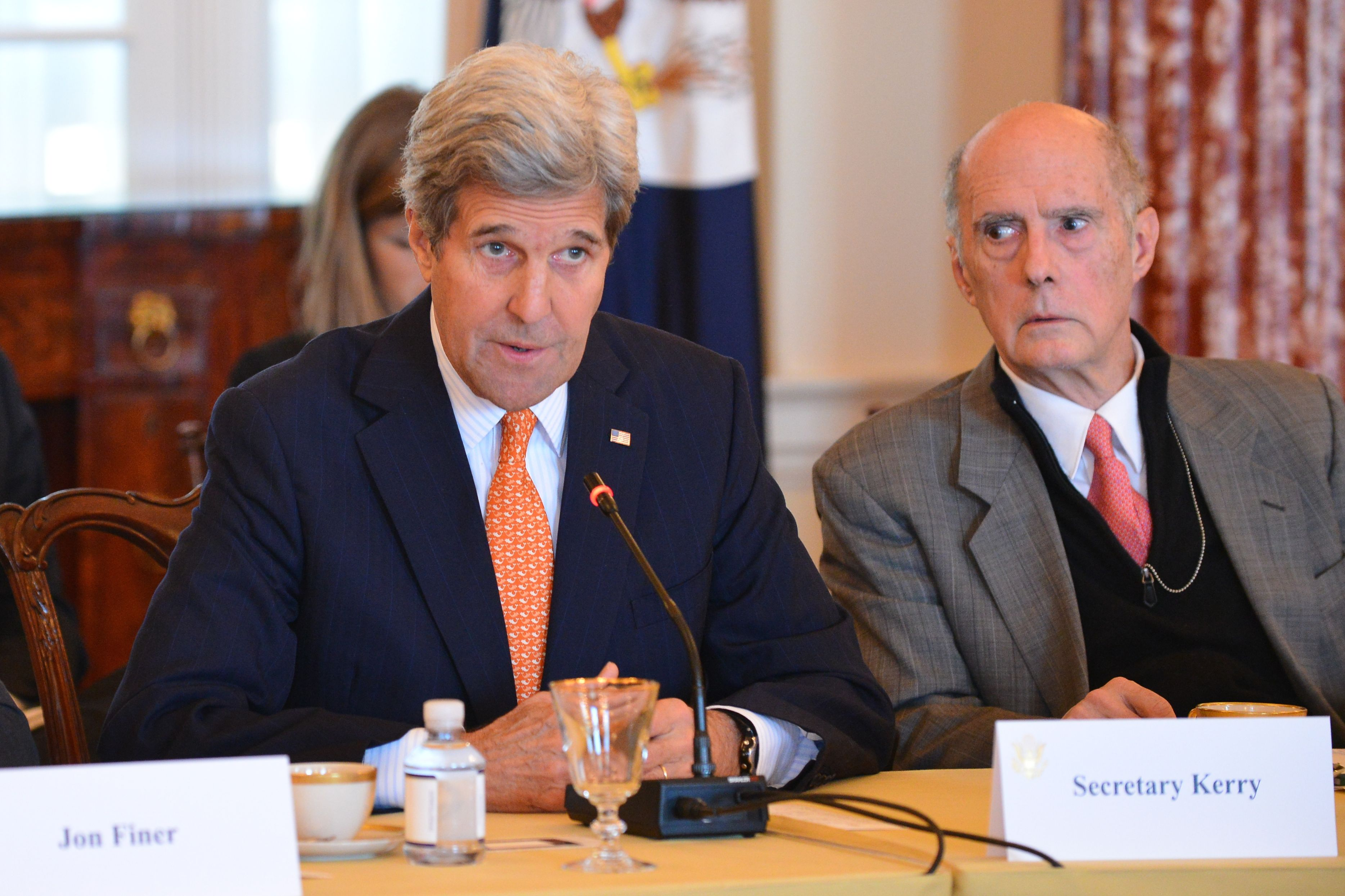
Talbott with Secretary of State John Kerry in 2016

Talbott was the sixth president of the Brookings Institution in Washington from 2002 to 2017. He helped raise more than $650 million in support of independent policy research and analysis. At Brookings, he was responsible for formulating policies, recommending projects, approving publications and selecting staff, focusing on Eastern Europe, Russia, and nuclear arms control. On January 31, 2017, Talbott announced his resignation from the Brookings Institution. The resignation was later retracted, but in October 2017, he was succeeded by General John R. Allen.

In December 2011, Talbott returned to government service as chair of the U.S. State Department’s Foreign Affairs Policy Board. He was on the advisory board of the DC non-profit America Abroad Media and holds leadership positions in other organizations such as the Aspen Institute and the American Academy of Diplomacy.

== Family ==
Talbott married Brooke Shearer in 1971. He had been the college roommate of her brother, Derek. Brooke was a personal aide to Hillary Clinton. They were married for 38 years, until her death on May 19, 2009. He has two sons, Devin and Adrian Talbott, co-founders of the now-defunct Generation Engage. In 2015, he married Barbara Lazear Ascher.

== Quotes ==
- "It was Yugoslavia's resistance to the broader trends of political and economic reform - not the plight of Kosovar Albanians - that best explains NATO's war."
- "In the next century, nations as we know it will be obsolete; all states will recognize a single, global authority. National sovereignty wasn't such a great idea after all." (Time)
- "The Russians have provided an opening for renewed diplomacy. Since last summer, President Dmitry Medvedev has been calling for a 'new Euro-Atlantic security architecture'. So far, except for rehashing old complaints and the unacceptable claim that other former Soviet republics fall within Russia's 'sphere of privileged interests', Mr Medvedev and Mr Lavrov have been vague about what they have in mind.

"That creates a vacuum that the United States and its European partners can fill with their own proposals. The theme of those should be accelerating the emergence of an international system (of which NATO is a part) that is prepared to include Russia rather than exclude or contain it, and to encourage positive forces in Russia that want to see their nation integrated in a globalized world organized around the search for common solutions to common problems." (Financial Times)

- "[I]t's Russia that must move toward us, toward our way of doing things...this may be an obnoxious confirmation of our doctrine of 'exceptionalism.' Well, tough. That's us; that's the U.S. We are exceptional....Russia is either coming our way, or it's not, in which case it's going to founder, as the USSR did."
- "We already know that the Kremlin helped put Trump into the White House and played him for a sucker…. Trump has been colluding with a hostile Russia throughout his presidency."

== Honors and awards ==
- Grand Officer of the Order of the Three Stars, Latvia (2012)
- Grand Cordon of the Order of the Rising Sun, Japan (2016)
- Order of the Golden Fleece (Georgia)

Political offices
Preceded by Clifton R. Wharton Jr.	United States Deputy Secretary of State; 1994–2001	Succeeded by Richard Armitage
Non-profit organization positions
Preceded by Michael Armacost	President of the Brookings Institution; 2002–2017	Succeeded by John R. Allen
