= International Institute for Population Sciences =

Training and research organization in Mumbai

- Abbreviation: IIPS
- Formation: 1956; 70 years ago
- Type: Government
- Legal status: Active
- Purpose: Conduct population research and share data
- Location: Govandi, Mumbai, Maharashtra
- Region served: India
- Director: Prof. Sanjay Kumar Mohanty
- Parent organization: Ministry of Health and Family Welfare, Government of India
- Website: www.iipsindia.ac.in

The International Institute for Population Sciences (IIPS) is a training and research organization based in Govandi, Mumbai. It focuses on population studies for the ESCAP region and operates under the Ministry of Health and Family Welfare, Government of India. IIPS is responsible to conduct key studies including the National Family Health Survey (NFHS), the evaluation of the National Rural Health Mission, and the Global Adult Tobacco Survey.

== History ==
Established in July 1956, it was initially known as the Demographic Training and Research Centre (DTRC) until 1970 and then as the International Institute for Population Studies (IIPS) until 1985. In 1985, it was re-designated to its current title and declared a Deemed to be University on 19 August 1985, under Section 3 of the UGC Act, 1956 by the Ministry of Human Resource Development, Government of India.

Founded under the sponsorship of the Sir Dorabji Tata Trust, the Government of India, and the United Nations, IIPS serves a large population in the Asia and Pacific region.

== Controversy ==
On 28 July 2023, Prof. K. S. James, the then Director of IIPS was temporarily suspended by the Ministry of Health and Family Welfare because of issues related to the hiring process for faculty members. According to The Wire, the Government asked James to resign due to dissatisfaction with some data sets from IIPS, which contradicted claims made by the Narendra Modi-led Union Government including that India was free of open defecation. When James refused, he was given a suspension order. On 11 October 2023, the Union Ministry issued an order revoking the suspension and accepted his resignation submitted in early August without stating whether the allegations against James were found to be false.

James was appointed director of IIPS in October 2018. Before this, he was a professor of population studies at Jawaharlal Nehru University in New Delhi. He also worked as a Professor the Population Research Centre at the Institute for Social and Economic Change in Bengaluru.
