= Justin Rockefeller =

American investor

- Born: Justin Aldrich Rockefeller; July 12, 1979 (age 47); Charleston, West Virginia, U.S.
- Education: Princeton University (BA)
- Occupations: Impact investor; financial technologist
- Spouse: Indré Vengris (m. 2006)
- Children: 2
- Parents: Jay Rockefeller; Sharon Percy Rockefeller

Justin Aldrich Rockefeller (born July 12, 1979) is an American impact investor and financial technology professional. He is one of the great-great grandchildren of John D. Rockefeller.

== Early life ==
Rockefeller was born on July 12, 1979, in West Virginia, the youngest son of former West Virginia senator Jay Rockefeller (1937–2026) and his wife, Sharon Percy Rockefeller (b. 1944). Rockefeller's maternal grandfather was former U.S. Senator Charles H. Percy (1919–2011), and his paternal grandparents were Blanchette Ferry Hooker (1909–1992) and John D. Rockefeller III (1906–1978), the eldest son of philanthropists John D. Rockefeller Jr. and Abby Aldrich Rockefeller.

Rockefeller graduated from St. Albans School in 1998 and Princeton University in 2002.

== Career ==
Rockefeller was the global director of family offices and foundations at Addepar, a financial technology company. Rockefeller co-founded, with Liesel Pritzker Simmons, The ImPact, a membership network of family enterprises (family offices, foundations, and businesses) that aims to make investments with measurable social impact.

== Personal life ==
In 2006, Rockefeller, who lives in New York City, married Indré Vengris, a dancer and fashion executive. They have two daughters.

== See also ==
- Rockefeller family
