= Rockefeller Guest House =

House in Manhattan, New York

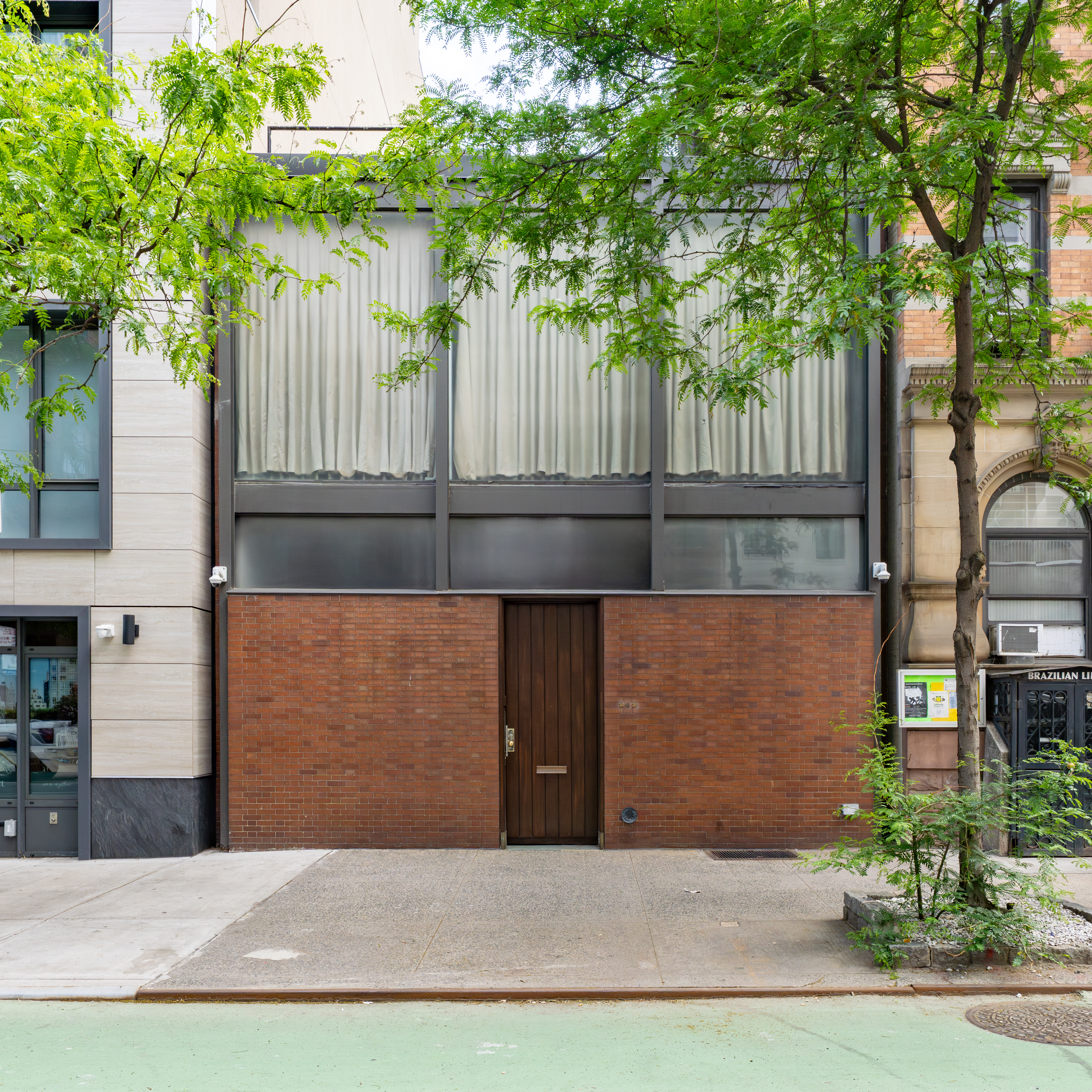
- Seen in 2026
- Interactive map of the Rockefeller Guest House area

General information
- Type: Residential
- Architectural style: Modernist
- Location: Manhattan, New York, US, 242 East 52nd Street
- Coordinates: 40°45′22″N 73°58′06″W
- Construction started: 1949
- Completed: 1950
- Client: Blanchette Rockefeller

Technical details
- Material: Red brick, glass (facade)
- Floor count: 2

Design and construction
- Architect: Philip Johnson
- Main contractor: Murphy-Brinkworth Construction

New York City Landmark
- Designated: December 5, 2000
- Reference no.: 2079

The Rockefeller Guest House is a building at 242 East 52nd Street in the East Midtown and Turtle Bay neighborhoods of Manhattan in New York City. Situated on the southern sidewalk of 52nd Street between Second Avenue and Third Avenue, it was designed by Philip Johnson and completed in 1950. The residence was constructed as a guest house for philanthropist Blanchette Rockefeller, who was married to John D. Rockefeller III. It was the only private residence in New York City that Johnson designed.

The two-story building contains a symmetrical facade of brick at ground level and glass above. The first story is made of dark red brick in Flemish bond. The second story is made of six translucent glass panels divided by four steel bars. Johnson designed the interior of the guest house with a living and dining room facing 52nd Street, as well as a bedroom in the rear. These are separated by an outdoor garden with a pool, separated from either room by fully glazed walls.

Johnson was hired to design the guest house in 1948 for Blanchette Rockefeller, who wanted a separate building to store her modern art collection, as her husband did not appreciate modern art. The house was constructed from 1949 to 1950 and initially hosted many functions for the Museum of Modern Art (MoMA), for which Blanchette Rockefeller was a patron. The house was donated to MoMA in 1955 and was then occupied by several residents, including Johnson himself between 1971 and 1979. The Rockefeller Guest House was sold in 1989, becoming the first house to be sold at an art auction in New York City. The New York City Landmarks Preservation Commission designated the Rockefeller Guest House as an official landmark in 2000.

== Site ==
The Rockefeller Guest House is at 242 East 52nd Street in the East Midtown and Turtle Bay neighborhoods of Manhattan in New York City. It is along the southern sidewalk of 52nd Street between Second Avenue and Third Avenue. The land lot has an area of 2,500 square feet (230 m^{2}), a frontage of 25 feet (7.6 m) along 52nd Street, and a depth of 100 feet (30 m). Nearby buildings include 312 and 314 East 53rd Street one block northwest and 303 East 51st Street one block southeast.

In the early 20th century, a large portion of Turtle Bay's population was involved in the arts or architecture, and structures such as the Beaux-Arts Institute of Design and the residential Turtle Bay Gardens and Beaux-Arts Apartments were constructed for this community. William Lescaze's renovation of an existing brownstone townhouse on 48th Street, and its subsequent conversion into the Lescaze House, inspired similar renovations to other structures in the neighborhood. The specific site of the Rockefeller Guest House had previously been occupied by two structures built around 1870. According to the guest house's architect Philip Johnson, there was a small house in the rear and a coach house in the front, separated by "a gap and a weed patch".

== Architecture ==
The Rockefeller Guest House, designed by Philip Johnson and completed in 1950, was one of the architect's first designs in New York City, as well as his only design of a residence in the city. When the Rockefeller Guest House was commissioned, Johnson was not yet a licensed architect in New York state, but he was already a noted proponent of the International Style of architecture. Frederick C. Genz, an architect with Johnson's firm, was the associate architect. Murphy-Brinkworth Construction Corp was the general contractor, and the Eipel Engineering Company was the Rockefeller Guest House's structural engineer. Numerous other engineers and contractors were involved in the building's construction.

The two-story facade on 52nd Street is made of dark red brick, black metal, and plate glass. According to Johnson, he built the second floor only to give the impression of height, since he felt "there is no point to doing a one-story house in New York—it would look all wrong". As Johnson said in the 1970s: 'The top of the house doesn't exist for me." The interior arrangement was patterned after Ludwig Mies van der Rohe's unbuilt designs for "court houses" in the 1930s. Johnson was likely also influenced by Mies's designs for buildings on the Illinois Institute of Technology campus. The previous coach house and residence on the site inspired the house's outdoor garden, which is placed between the indoor living/dining room at the front and the bedroom at the rear.

=== Facade ===
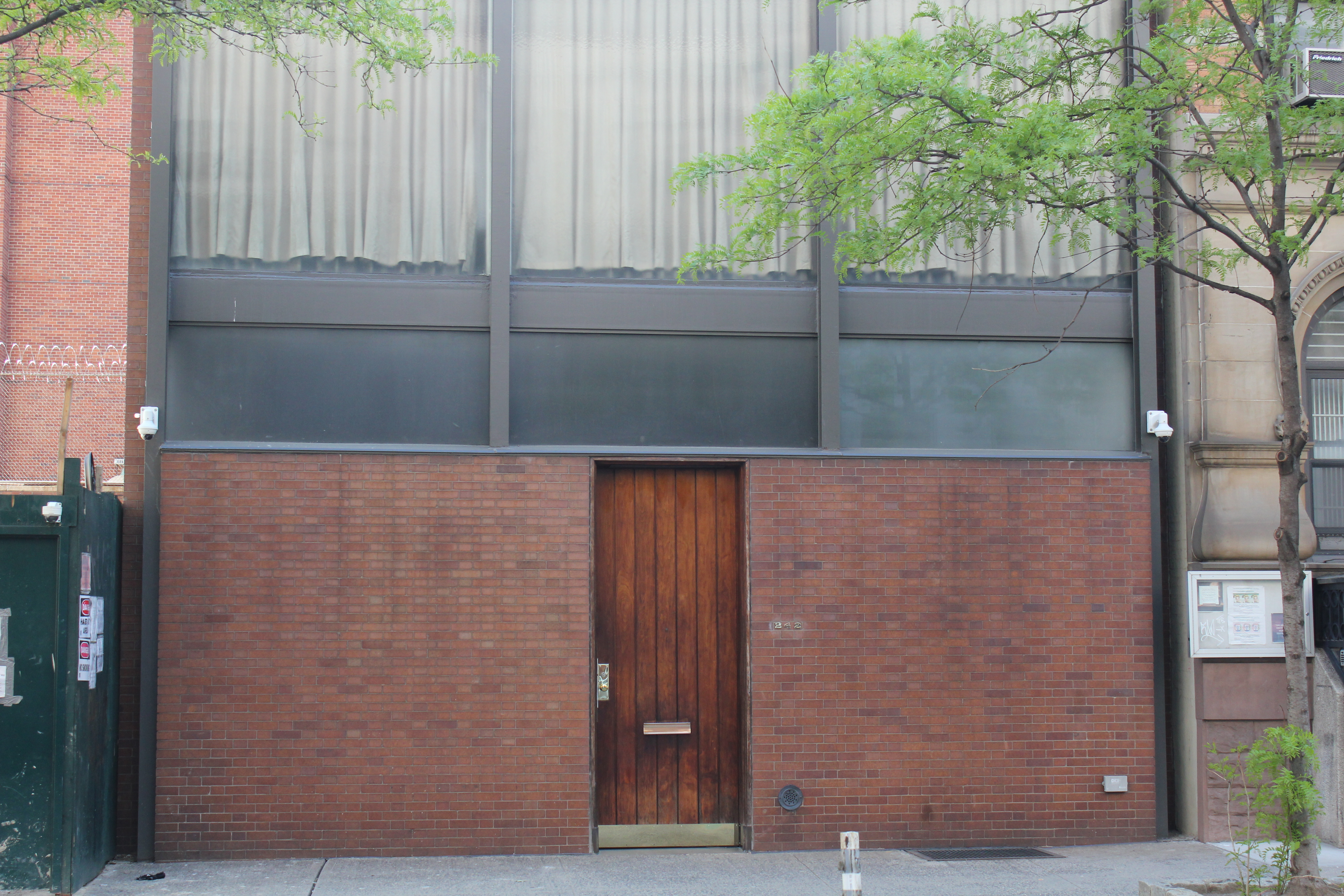
Doorway detail

Much of the first story along 52nd Street is clad with red brick in Flemish bond and tan mortar. This material was used to complement the school building immediately to the east, which was demolished after 2019. The guest house's brick wall is about 9 feet (2.7 m) high and extends to the lot line. The brick wall is flanked by a strip of metal on either side, separating the main facade from the west (right) and east (left) walls, which are mostly composed of plain brick walls. At the center of the 52nd Street facade is a wooden door that is as tall as the surrounding brick wall. This door is composed of seven vertical planks, an eyehole, and a mailbox slot. The door is surrounded by a frame made of wood. There are brass digits "2 4 2" on the brick wall right of the door.

The upper section of the first floor, as well as the entire second floor, is made of six panels of translucent windows, divided into three bays by four vertical steel beams. The two outer beams on either end of the facade rise from the ground to the roof, while the two inner beams rise from the top of the brick wall to the roof. Above the first story, each of the vertical beams has a projecting H-section, to which horizontal metal spandrels are welded. The clerestory windows of the first floor are below the spandrels while the second-floor windows are above. The second floor windows are about 10 feet (3.0 m) tall. Heavy drapes were mounted inside the second floor, and identical drapes on the first floor gave the impression that the windows spanned a single floor. The roof of the guest house has a metal fence, which runs from west to east and is slightly set behind the roofline on 52nd Street. There are also pipes, a ventilation unit, and a chimney on the roof.

=== Interior ===
Johnson placed a living and dining room on 52nd Street and a bedroom in the rear. These are separated by an outdoor atrium garden, separated from either room by fully glazed walls. The guest house was equipped with a heating system in the floors and ceiling, and the furniture was designed to match the character of the house. Johnson designed many of the original pieces of furniture. The interior was minimalist in design, with linoleum floors and plain brick walls. The plaster was removed from the existing brick walls, which were then painted white, serving as a background for the collection of the house's patron, Blanchette Ferry Rockefeller. The black-and-white color scheme was intended to complement the owner's art collection rather than compete with it. The lack of plastering on the walls, though unusual when the house was constructed, subsequently became commonplace in Manhattan townhouses. Recessed lighting fixtures, designed by lighting consultant Richard Kelly, were installed in the ceiling.

The living room is designed as a 36-by-23-foot (11.0 by 7.0 m) space with a large fireplace. A walnut storage cabinet was placed in the front of the main entrance, and a stair to the second floor was to the right. The house originally had a kitchenette in the living room, immediately right of the main doorway, behind a screen that could be folded shut when the kitchenette was not being used. The kitchen was subsequently moved to the basement. Outside the living room, facing the garden, is a patio underneath a glass awning. Two smaller bedrooms and two bathrooms are placed above the living/dining room. The second-floor bedrooms are positioned to face the garden. The rear of the house contains the master bedroom, dressing room, and bathroom. The front rooms and rear bedroom are both separated from the garden by full-height sheets of glass.

The garden between the living/dining area and the bedroom consists of an outdoor pond, which occupies the lot's full width. Three rectangular travertine "stones" in the pond serve as a walkway. This walkway, lit by underwater fixtures during the night, was meant to inspire "a sense of adventure". A waterfall in the garden served to screen the living/dining area and the bedroom. The waterfall was fed by a pipe over the patio, and a lotus tree was also planted in the pool. The garden was patterned after Mies's "court houses", as well as George Nelson's design of the Sherman M. Fairchild residence on 17 East 65th Street, but differed from both Mies's "court houses" and the Fairchild residence in that the garden was outdoors. Johnson's design also drew from ancient Roman motifs.

== History ==
Blanchette Ferry Hooker was born in 1909 to Elon Huntington Hooker and Blanche Ferry, and she became part of the Rockefeller family in 1932 after marrying John D. Rockefeller III. Blanchette then became a patron of the Museum of Modern Art (MoMA), which had been cofounded by Abby Aldrich Rockefeller, her mother-in-law. By the 1940s, Blanchette and John III lived at One Beekman Place in Turtle Bay, several blocks from the Rockefeller Guest House. Toward the end of that decade, Blanchette began collecting modern art for her house. Abby's and Blanchette's enthusiasm for modern art was not shared by either John III or his father John D. Rockefeller Jr. While Abby had converted the top floor at her house at 10 West 54th Street (Note: The house at 10 West 54th Street was demolished in 1938 and replaced with an extension of MoMA.) into a private salon, Blanchette wanted a standalone structure for displaying artwork and receiving guests. Philip Johnson, who was the unofficial architect for MoMA during his career, also happened to live in Turtle Bay, having resided there for over three decades since at least 1930.

=== Construction ===
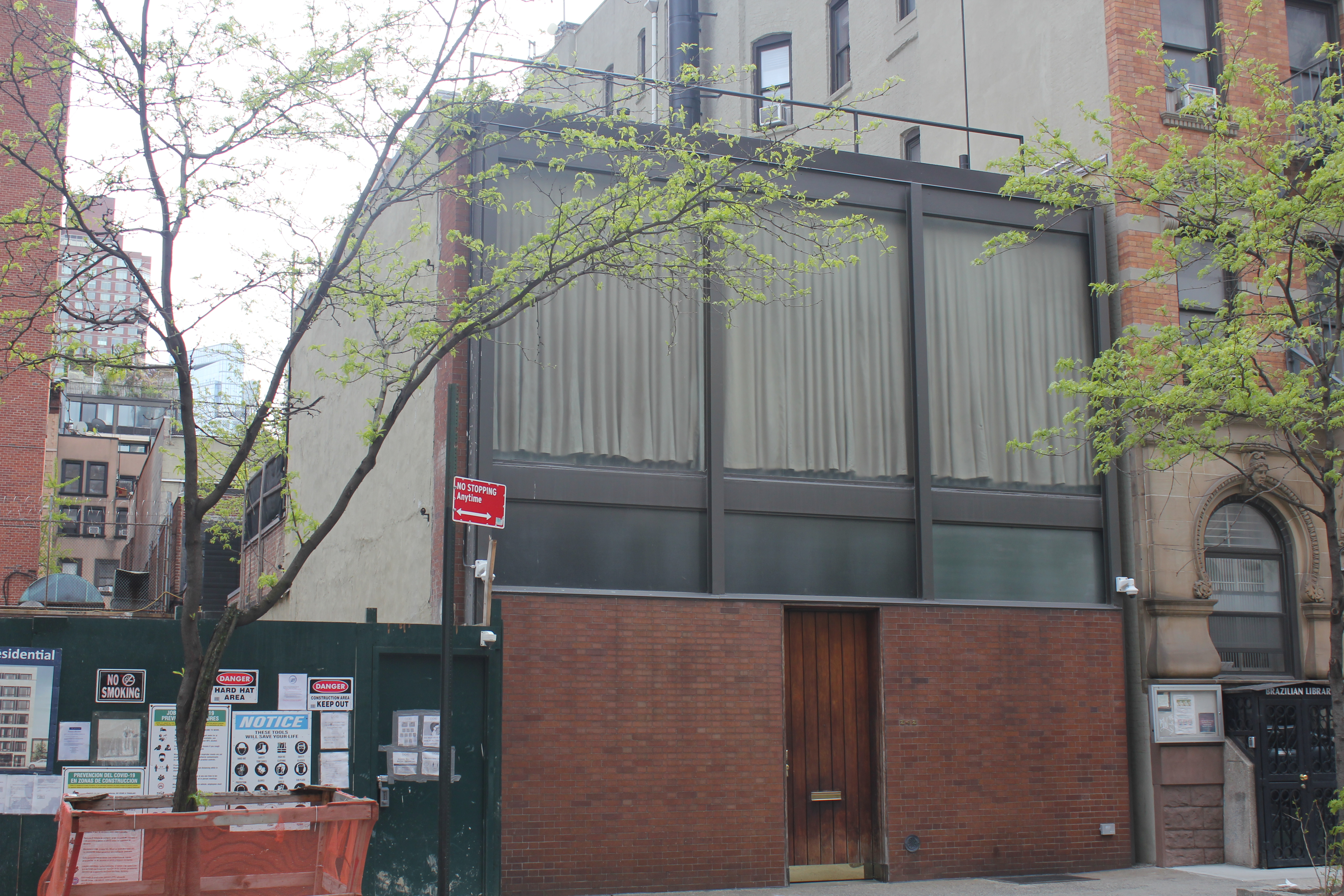
Seen in April 2021

The Empire Mortgage Company, agent for the Rockefeller family, purchased the 25-by-100-foot lot at 242 East 52nd Street in June 1948. The lot was about halfway between Blanchette Rockefeller's house and MoMA. Blanchette commissioned Johnson to build the Rockefeller Guest House on the site. At the time, the lot was occupied by a four-story house. Johnson demolished most of the existing structure except for the brick walls on either side of the lot. In December 1948, plans for an alteration to the existing building were filed with the New York City Department of Buildings. Frederick C. Genz was listed as the architect for the renovation, which was to cost $64,000. The project was labeled as an alteration because the outer walls of the existing structure were to remain.

Work started on the Rockefeller Guest House in early 1949. In its design and construction process, the project was referred to as the O'Hare House. By September of that year, The New York Times reported the guest house was almost completed. Blanchette and John III intended to continue residing at One Beekman Place and, according to a Rockefeller family spokesperson, they wished to call the structure an "adjunct" rather than a guesthouse. According to the North American Newspaper Alliance, the guest house "precludes any Elks' convention type of invasion by the 47 Hookers and 48 Rockefellers who were listed as attending the couple's wedding in 1932". The Rockefeller Guest House was completed in 1950.

=== 1950s to 1970s ===
The public was first invited to enter the house in 1954, when an exhibition of young artists' work was displayed to benefit MoMA's Junior Council. Afterward, the house became a popular destination among the public. The guest house was informally used as an extension of MoMA's operations, hosting parties as well as staff and trustee committees. The house was maintained by "a butler named Charles", who organized the MoMA's events. John Rockefeller III attended several of the parties and once stayed overnight with the couple's children, (Note: The couple's children were Jay, Hope, Sandra, and Alida.) even though he did not like modern art. John III came to express remorse over letting Blanchette spend so much time operating the guest house. The Rockefellers agreed to donate the guest house to MoMA in 1955. The house was donated by 1958, and the original furniture was donated to MoMA. Under MoMA's operation, the Rockefeller Guest House hosted events such as a selection from the collection of Walter Bareiss in 1958 and a showing of the James Thrall Soby collection in 1961.

In April 1962, MoMA agreed to sell the Rockefeller Guest House to Robert C. Leonhardt and his family for $100,000. The sale was not publicized until February 1964, when The New York Times reported that the Leonhardt family planned to move into the house in May. The completion of the Founders Room at MoMA's main campus had, by then, made the Rockefeller Guest House unnecessary for MoMA functions. The Leonhardt family used the guest house as a pied-à-terre, with their main house on Long Island.

Robert Leonhardt died in 1971, and his wife Lee Sherrod wished to find a tenant for the house. The same year, Johnson and his partner David Whitney leased the house. Johnson and Whitney moved into the house the same year, residing there until 1979. Johnson repainted the walls from green to white, removed the original goat's hair curtains, and bought movable furniture. In addition, the couple put up contemporary works by artists like John Chamberlain, Roy Lichtenstein, and Frank Stella. Whitney's friend Andy Warhol described the couple's dwelling as being akin to "loft living".

=== 1980s to present ===
Robin Symes, an antiquities dealer from London, bought the house in 1979. According to Symes's partner Christo Michailidis, they had "fallen in love" with the house and found it to be a good place for storing their Art Deco furniture collection. Symes furnished the guest house with works by Pierre Legrain, Eileen Gray, and Émile-Jacques Ruhlmann. By March 1989, Symes was only living in the house for twenty days a year, and he sought to sell the house. Auctioneer Sotheby's was assigned to sell the house, even though it had never previously sold a house at an art auction. The Rockefeller Guest House was also the first to be sold at an art auction in New York City. Sotheby's agreed to sell the house because, according to Sotheby's president Diana D. Brooks, "it is a Philip Johnson redesigned town house". Symes also wanted to sell the furnishings in the house, which were expected to sell for $2–3 million, compared to the house itself, which had a projected price of $1.5–2 million.

The house was ultimately sold for $3.5 million to a "foreign buyer", while the collection netted $4.3 million. The auction drew nine bidders, including one who was crossing the Holland Tunnel while placing his bid and found that the house was already sold when he emerged. The buyer was subsequently revealed as MoMA trustee Ronald Lauder. By 1996, architect Robert A. M. Stern had suggested that the Rockefeller Guest House was a viable candidate for official landmark status. The New York City Landmarks Preservation Commission (LPC) had held hearings in 1993 for designating the guest house as a landmark, but the designation was not accorded at that time.

In the mid-1990s, the building was purchased by Anthony d'Offay. When he owned the house, d'Offay mounted some Warhol pieces on the walls. D'Offay was planning to sell the building by May 2000. The next month, auctioneer Christie's sold the house to a high bidder who paid $10.1 million. The LPC designated the Rockefeller Guest House as a city landmark on December 5, 2000. Simultaneously, the buyer closed on the house for $11.16 million, or $3,985 per square foot ($42,890/m^{2}), making it the most expensive real estate transaction per square foot in New York City history. The anonymous buyer supported the landmark designation, regarding the house as a "work of art", according to his lawyer. Lauder was reported in The New Yorker to be the buyer of the house. Lauder sold the house in December 2023 for an estimated $20 million to Ludo USA, a limited liability company.

== Reception ==
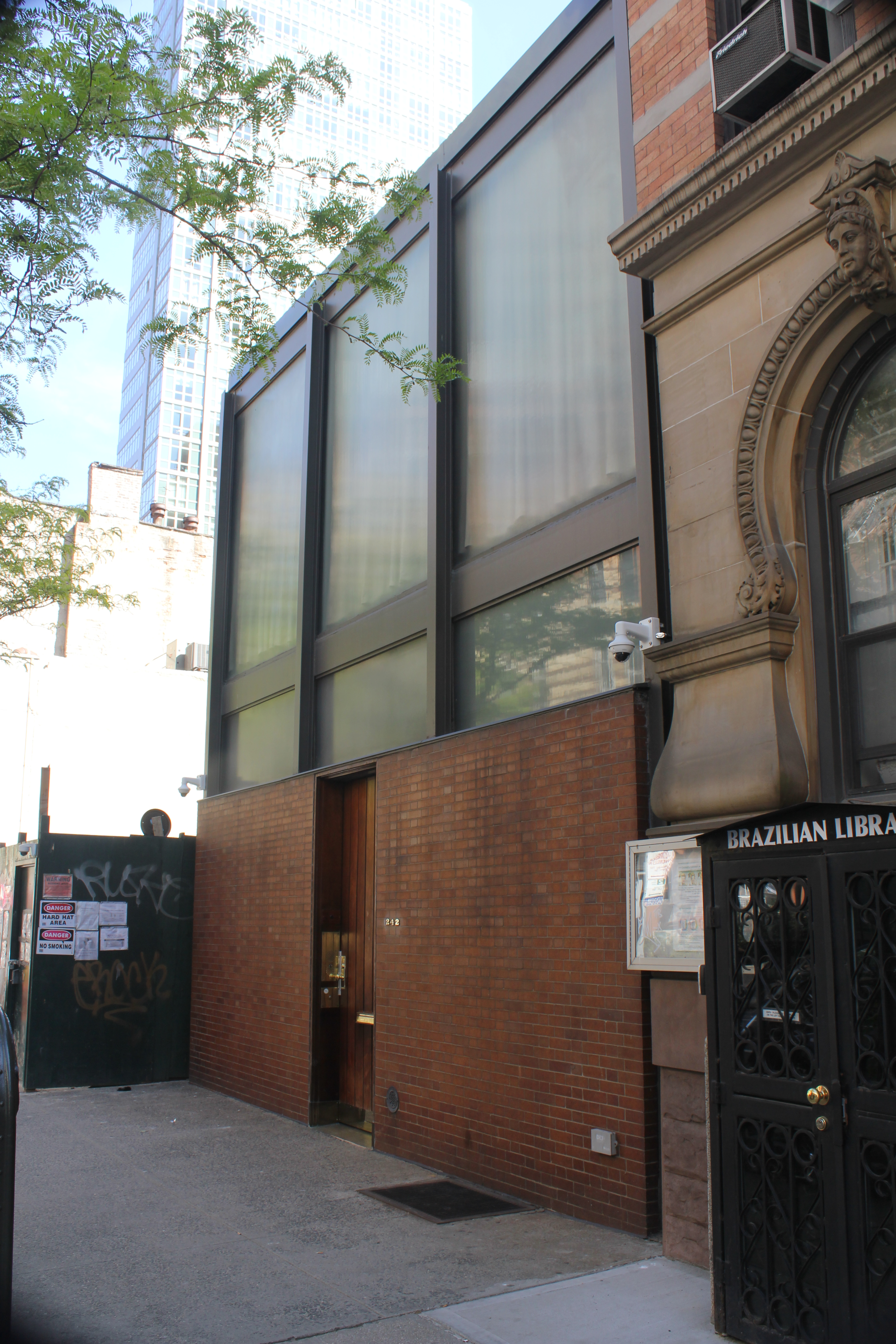
Seen at right

The Rockefeller Guest House was covered extensively in media such as Architectural Review, Interiors, and The New York Times when it was completed. House and Home magazine, in 1955, described the living room as a "masterpiece of restraint", which in its understated form helped to show off John III's wealth. In a 1961 guide published by MoMA, the house was characterized by Ada Louise Huxtable as "a handsome, unconventional house designed within the limitations of the conventional narrow city lot", whose materials remained "familiar and urban" in contrast to other modernist structures like the Lescaze House. When the house was sold in 1964, the Times described it as "one of Mr. Johnson's most striking designs". Despite this, the Rockefeller Guest House was relatively nondescript; in 2017, the New York Times Magazine described it as "the best preserved—and yet least known—of Johnson's New York works".

Some observers described the design as having East Asian design motifs. Architectural Forum described the garden as a design feature "that might have appealed to Lao Tse the philosopher". According to Russell Lynes, a historian for MoMA, the garden may have been included to cater to the "Rockefellers' taste for things Japanese". Though John III had not liked modern art, he had founded the Asia Society in 1956 (after the Rockefeller Guest House was completed) and amassed 300 works of Asian art in his lifetime. Conversely, the house was described by Robert A. M. Stern as "distinctly Classical in inspiration" but reflective of Mies's style.

== See also ==
- List of New York City Designated Landmarks in Manhattan from 14th to 59th Streets
- List of works by Philip Johnson
