= Jean Mauzé =

American banker (1903–1974)

Jean Mauzé (January 15, 1903 – January 7, 1974) was a Manhattan banker, senior vice president of United States Trust Company and married Abby Rockefeller on April 23, 1953. After his wife created the Greenacre Foundation in 1968, he donated Greenacre Park to City of New York in 1971.

== Early life ==
Mauzé was a son of Rev. Dr. J. Layton Mauzé. His brother was the Rev. Dr. George Mauzé. Mauzé graduated from Davidson College in 1923. He was later awarded an honorary Doctor of Laws degree in 1972.

During World War II, he served in Navy in the Pacific and was a commander in the Reserve.

== Career ==
In 1941, he joined the United States Trust Company in New York and by 1961, was Senior Vice President. Although he retired from U.S. Trust in 1968, he continued to serve the bank as a consultant.

Mauzé was a member of the investment advisory group of Commercial Union Insurance Company of New York, a director of the Freeport Minerals Company, the Brooklyn Savings Bank, One William Street Fund, Inc., and a member of the finance committee of the Rockefeller Brothers Fund. He also served as a governor, financial vice president and chairman of the finance committee of New York Hospital.

== Personal life ==
On April 23, 1953, he married Abby Rockefeller (1903–1976), the eldest child and only daughter of John D. Rockefeller Jr. and Abby Aldrich. The ceremony took place at the home of Abby's brother, Laurance Rockefeller in New York, with Jean's brother, Rev. Dr. George Mauzé, a Presbyterian minister, officiating. Abby had been widowed in 1949, after the death of her second husband, Dr. Irving Hotchkiss Pardee.

He was a member of the University Club of New York and the Piping Rock Club in Locust Valley, NY. Mauzé died from cancer on January 7, 1974 at age 70.

== See also ==
- Rockefeller family
