= Abby Rockefeller Mauzé =

American philanthropist (1903–1976)

- Born: Abigail Aldrich Rockefeller; November 9, 1903
- Died: May 27, 1976 (aged 72); New York City, U.S.
- Occupation: Philanthropist
- Spouses: David M. Milton (m. 1925; div. 1943) Irving H. Pardee (m. 1946; died 1949) Jean Mauzé (m. 1953; died 1974)
- Children: 2
- Parents: John Davison Rockefeller Jr.; Abigail Greene Aldrich
- Relatives: Rockefeller family

Abigail Aldrich Rockefeller Mauzé (November 9, 1903 – May 27, 1976) was an American philanthropist. She was the daughter of American philanthropists John D. Rockefeller Jr. and Abby Aldrich Rockefeller as well as a granddaughter of Standard Oil co-founder John D. Rockefeller.

== Family background ==
Abigail was the first child and only daughter of philanthropists John D. Rockefeller Jr. and Abigail Greene "Abby" Aldrich. She was commonly referred to as "Babs" to avoid confusion with her mother. She attended both the Chapin School and the Brearley School in New York City.

== Philanthropy ==
She and her five brothers carried on the Rockefeller family tradition of philanthropy stemming back to their paternal grandparents, Standard Oil co-founder John Davison Rockefeller Sr. and schoolteacher Laura Celestia "Cettie" Spelman.

Unlike her famed brothers, she remained out of the public eye. Throughout her life, Rockefeller held many positions: membership of the Board of Trustees of the Rockefeller Brothers Fund, set up by her and her brothers in 1940, advisory member of the Memorial Sloan-Kettering Cancer Center board of trustees, (a chief benefactor of the center along with her brother, Laurance, she received its Medal of Appreciation in 1965), and honorary trustee of the Rockefeller Family Fund, founded by various family members in 1967.

She was a benefactor of several organizations, including the Metropolitan Museum of Art, the YWCA, the New York Hospital, the Museum of Modern Art, (founded by her mother, and affairs her brother's Nelson and David played major roles in), the New York Zoological Society, (a major interest of her brother Laurance), and the Asia Society, which was established by an other brother, John D. Rockefeller III.

In 1968, she created the Greenacre Foundation, of which she was president, to maintain and operate parks in New York State for the benefit of the public. In 1971, Rockefeller gifted Greenacre Park in Manhattan to the Foundation. She also made cash and stock contributions to East Woods School, the Rockefeller Brothers Fund, the Population Council, the Planned Parenthood Federation of America, and the American Red Cross.

== Personal life ==
Rockefeller married three times and had two children. Her first marriage took place on May 14, 1925, to David M. Milton (1900–1976), a lawyer and banker. Before their divorce in 1943, they had two daughters:

- Abigail Rockefeller Milton (1928–2017), who married George Dorr O'Neill
- Marilyn Ellen Milton (1931–1980), who married William Kelly Simpson (1928–2017), son of Kenneth F. Simpson, a Republican member of the United States House of Representatives from New York. Together, they had two daughters:
  - Laura Knickerbacker Simpson (1954–2012), who married Grover O'Neill III in 1974.
  - Abigail Rockefeller Simpson (b. 1958), who married Todd Mydland.

In 1946, she began her second marriage, to Dr. Irving H. Pardee (1892–1949), a neurologist and brother of cardiologist Harold E. B. Pardee. After his death in 1949, she married Jean Mauzé (1903–1974), a banker, on April 23, 1953. They remained married until his death on January 7, 1974.

Rockefeller owned property in Bermuda, the Roman Corporation at One Beekman Place in New York City, and the Pocantico family estate, Kykuit, in Westchester County, New York.

She died on May 27, 1976, due to cancer, at her apartment in New York City.

== See also ==
- Rockefeller family
