= Hope Aldrich Rockefeller =

American newspaper publisher

- Born: Hope Aldrich Rockefeller; May 17, 1938 (age 88); New York City, New York, U.S.
- Spouse: John Spencer (m. 1959, divorced)
- Children: 3
- Parent(s): John Davison Rockefeller III; Blanchette Ferry Rockefeller
- Relatives: See Rockefeller family

Hope Aldrich Rockefeller (born May 17, 1938) is a retired American newspaper publisher and businesswoman. Rockefeller was born on May 17, 1938, the second daughter of philanthropist John Davison Rockefeller III and his wife Blanchette Ferry Hooker. Her paternal grandparents were John Davison Rockefeller Jr. and Abby Aldrich Rockefeller and her maternal grandfather was Elon Huntington Hooker.

In 1996, Rockefeller was New Mexico's third wealthiest resident, with an approximate net worth of $250 million ($475 million adjusted to inflation in 2022).

== Family ==
She was the third of four children:

- Sandra Ferry Rockefeller (October 14, 1935 – October 25, 2024)
- John Davison "Jay" Rockefeller IV (June 18, 1937 – November 6, 2026)
- Hope Aldrich Rockefeller (born May 17, 1938)
- Alida Ferry Rockefeller (born 1948)

== Early life and career ==
She grew up in New York City and Mount Pleasant, New York. Hope pursued a career in journalism and has worked for Long Island's Newsday, Beijing's China Daily, New York City's The Village Voice, and the Washington Monthly. In 1978, she joined Santa Fe Reporter in Santa Fe, New Mexico to work for Richard McCord as a news reporter. In 1988, she acquired the newspaper from him, and became a publisher.

== Personal life ==
Rockefeller married John Spencer (born February 3, 1930) on July 5, 1959, in Irvington, New York. They resided in Santa Fe, New Mexico where she published her weekly newspaper until their divorce. They had three sons;

- David "Dave" Hooker Spencer (born December 1, 1961), a Republican advocate
- Benjamin Murray Spencer (December 11, 1964 – June 24, 1989)
- Theodore Spencer (born August 3, 1966), a trustee of the Rockefeller Brothers Fund

== See also ==
- Rockefeller family
