= Bareiss =

Bareiss or Bareiß is a surname. Notable people with the surname include:

- Thomas Bareiß (born 1975), German politician
- Walter Bareiss (1919–2007), German-American businessman and art collector

== Others ==
- Bareiss Prüfgerätebau GmbH, a German materials testing company founded in 1954

== See also ==
- Bareiss algorithm
