= Rockefeller Archive Center =

Organization in New York, US

The Rockefeller Archive Center is an independently operated foundation that was initially established to serve as a repository for the records of Rockefeller University and various Rockefeller family philanthropy projects. Until 2008, it was a division of Rockefeller University.

== Founding and history ==
The Rockefeller Archive Center was initially established in 1974 as a division of Rockefeller University. It is located in the Hillcrest house, in Pocantico Hills, North Tarrytown, NY, adjacent to the Kykuit estate. Hillcrest was initially constructed in 1963 for Martha Baird Rockefeller, wife of John D. Rockefeller, Jr., although she never stayed in the house. Martha played a key role in collaborating with architect Mott Schmidt for the design of the house, as evidenced by sketches and letters. The 32-room mansion is situated on 24 acres, and the property was given to the Rockefeller Brothers Fund at Martha's death in 1971.

Lower-level storage vaults with temperature and humidity control were constructed in 1974 as the beginnings of the Rockefeller Archive Center, which opened its doors in 1975. Construction was done to create 2.5 floors of archival storage below the existing residence. The house continues to contain other family artwork and artifacts, including John D. Rockefeller Jr.’s oak-paneled office from 26 Broadway, relocated to Hillcrest in its original configuration.

== Collections ==
While the Rockefeller Archive Center was initially conceived as a repository for records of Rockefeller University and Rockefeller Family philanthropic projects, it now more broadly contains the records of over 40 organizations and more than 100 individuals, including the Social Science Research Council, Asia Society, the Ford Foundation, Trilateral Commission, Russell Sage Foundation, Rockefeller Foundation, Laura Spelman Rockefeller Memorial, Rockefeller Brothers Fund, Rockefeller University, the Commonwealth Fund, and the Henry Luce Foundation. Rockefeller family records contain material dating back to 1857 and include letters, records of Nelson Rockefeller's governorship of New York, photographs of Rockefeller properties, and more.

The archives collection includes documents, personal records and correspondence, films, photographs, audio, and video. In 2018, collections included 55,000 cubic feet of records, approximately 1 million photographs, 25,000 audiovisual items, 18,000 microfilm reels, and 45 terabytes of digital data. A large portion of these audiovisual materials have been digitized.

Collections are cataloged and available for research; over 400 researchers from around the world visit the archives each year, archives staff respond to approximately 2000 email reference requests, and the Center manages a grant program which funds researchers to visit for on-site research. Only the expurgated records of deceased family members are publicly available to scholars and researchers; all records pertaining to living members are closed to historians. However, as Nelson Rockefeller's researcher, Cary Reich, discovered, in the case of Nelson's voluminous 3,247 cubic feet (91.9 m^{3}) of papers, only about one-third of these files had been processed and released to researchers up to 1996. He reports that it will be many years before all the papers will be open to the public, despite Nelson's having died in 1979.

In addition to working with a wealth of archival records in print format, archivists at the Rockefeller Archives Center work to promote the preservation of digital records of non-profit organizations, and work directly with foundations to help them care for their own records – including digital records – which can eventually be transferred to the Rockefeller Archives Center for safekeeping. The effort has been developed as Project Electron, and it includes a repository for digital records and their metadata, as well as an API that helps other organizations share records with the repository. Created in partnership with Marist College, Project Electron is an open source system designed to help non-profit organizations keep abreast of digital record management and archiving.

Major subject areas represented in the collection include:

- Agriculture
- The Arts
- African-American history
- Education
- International Relations
- Economic Development
- Labor
- Medicine
- Philanthropy
- Politics
- Population
- Religion
- Social Sciences
- Social Welfare
- Women's history

== Educational programming ==
The Center provides educational programming for local schools which supports students and teachers in doing research projects on various aspects of American history by giving access to primary source material from the Rockefeller Archives Center collections. Students are given the opportunity to create projects with the help of staff and archivists, to visit the Archives, and to present final research projects in a public forum.
