= Rockefeller Family Fund =

- Formation: 1967
- Founders: Martha, John, Laurance, Nelson, and David Rockefeller
- Type: Nonprofit
- Tax ID no.: 13-6257658
- Legal status: 501(c)(3) organization
- Purpose: Philanthropy
- Headquarters: New York, New York
- President: Miranda Kaiser
- Website: rffund.org

The Rockefeller Family Fund (RFF) is a philanthropic foundation created by members of the Rockefeller family, that “initiates, cultivates, and funds strategic efforts to promote a sustainable, just, free, and participatory society.” The president of the RFF is Miranda Kaiser, a great-granddaughter of David Rockefeller. The RFF is active in areas such as environmental protection, promoting economic equality for women, and supporting socially disadvantaged citizens and refugees.

== History ==
The Rockefeller Family Fund was established in 1967 by Martha, John, Laurance, Nelson, and David Rockefeller. The “Cousins,” as the grandchildren of John D. Rockefeller Jr. were called, were already important supporters of the left-wing counterculture in the 1960s. When John D. Rockefeller Jr.'s widow, Martha Baird Rockefeller, died in 1971, she left $72 million to charity, including $10 million to the RFF. This new foundation asset sparked heated discussions among the cousins about what the money should be used for. Laurance Rockefeller's daughter Marion wrote in an internal memo to her cousins: “We believe that the fund has a duty to support organizations such as the American Friends Service Committee, Friends of the Earth, Pacifica Radio, American Documentary Films [...] regardless of their tax status.” The Rockefeller Family Fund has since become a left-wing foundation, according to the conservative Capital Research Center.

On March 23, 2016, the fund announced that it would divest its interests in fossil fuels, eliminating its Exxon stake.

== Activities ==
Today, the RFF primarily supports three areas:

- Environment, in the area of climate change and the decommissioning of coal-fired power plants.
- Economic equality for women, whose main focus is to lobby for an increase in the number of paid sick days for working women.
- Democracy work, with a focus on the “adoption of laws for the automatic and permanent registration of all voters.”

== Criticism ==
RFF has been accused of astroturfing in order to achieve its goals.

== See also ==
- Rockefeller Foundation
- Rockefeller Brothers Fund
- Rockefeller family
