= Stephen B. Heintz =

American nonprofit executive and public policy expert

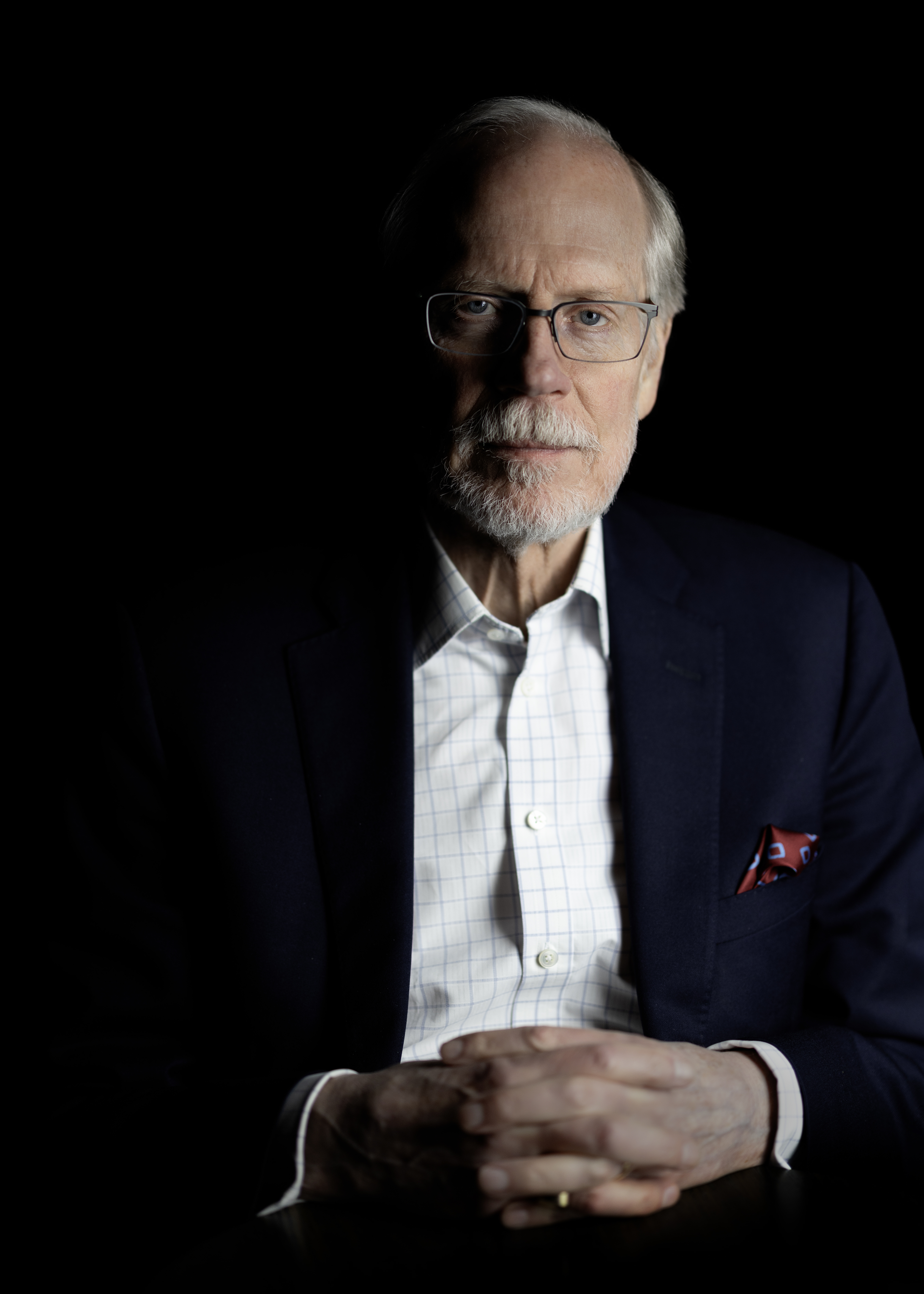
- Stephen Heintz in 2025.
- Education: Yale University (BA)
- Office: President and CEO of Rockefeller Brothers Fund
- Predecessor: Colin Campbell

Stephen B. Heintz is an American nonprofit executive. Since 2001, he has served as president of the Rockefeller Brothers Fund, a family foundation with an endowment of approximately $1.2 billion that advances social change for a more just, sustainable, and peaceful world. Heintz coined the term "acupuncture philanthropy" to describe his philanthropic approach of leveraging modest financial assets to trigger larger systemic change on critical issues.

== Early life and education ==
In 1974, Heintz graduated magna cum laude from Yale University with a B.A. in American Studies.

== Career ==
Heintz began his professional life working for the state of Connecticut, starting as the chief of staff to then-senate majority leader Joseph Lieberman in 1974. From 1982 to 1988, he served as Connecticut's Commissioner of the Department of Income Maintenance, responsible for managing the social services programs for low income residents of the state. For the next two years, he was Connecticut's Commissioner of Economic Development.

Heintz served as executive vice president and chief operating officer for the EastWest Institute from 1990-1997. Based in Prague, he managed programs throughout Central and Eastern Europe and the former Soviet Union to help propel civil society development, economic reform, and international security as the bedrock of these burgeoning democracies. In 2012, President Bronisław Komorowski of Poland granted him the Officer’s Cross of the Order of Merit of the Republic of Poland for his contributions to building civil society and democratic institutions in Poland. The award was presented at the Polish Embassy in 2014.

After returning the United States, Heintz co-founded Dēmos, a public policy organization that works to reduce political and economic inequality and to broaden citizen engagement in American democracy, and served as its president until 2001.

Heintz was appointed president of the Rockefeller Brothers Fund in 2001. In 2002, he led the RBF's joint initiative with the UN Association of the USA to open a Track II dialogue that helped lay the groundwork for the Iran nuclear deal. The Iran Project, which he co-founded, keeps alive the possibility of a peaceful relationship with Iran despite the U.S. withdrawal from this historic agreement. In 2007, Heintz convened a meeting of the Kosovo Unity Team and prominent global diplomatic figures at the Fund’s Pocantico Center, resulting in the Pocantico Declaration that set a path for the Kosovo independence process. In 2010, he set an ambitious path to align investment of the Fund’s financial assets with its mission, resulting in its 2014 decision to divest from fossil fuels and establishing the RBF as a leader in the DivestInvest movement.

He is a member of the American Academy of Arts and Sciences and a member of the Council on Foreign Relations and of the China Council for International Cooperation on Environment and Development. He also serves on the boards of the David Rockefeller Fund and the Rockefeller Archive Center. Heintz is the recipient of the Council on Foundations 2018 Distinguished Service Award.

Together with Danielle Allen and Eric Liu, Heintz chaired the bipartisan Commission on the Practice of Democratic Citizenship of the American Academy of Arts and Sciences. The commission, which was launched "to explore how best to respond to the weaknesses and vulnerabilities in our political and civic life and to enable more Americans to participate as effective citizens in a diverse 21st-century democracy", issued a report, titled Our Common Purpose: Reinventing American Democracy for the 21st Century, in June 2020. The report included strategies and policy recommendations "to help the nation emerge as a more resilient democracy by 2026."
