= Harold E. B. Pardee =

American cardiologist (1886–1973)

- Born: Harold Ensign Bennet Pardee; December 11, 1886
- Died: February 28, 1973 (aged 86); Manhattan, New York
- Education: Columbia College; Columbia Medical School
- Occupations: Physician, cardiologist
- Relatives: Irving H. Pardee (brother)
- Medical career
- Institutions: The New York Hospital; Cornell University Medical College

Harold Ensign Bennet Pardee (December 11, 1886 – February 28, 1973) was an American cardiologist and pioneer in electrocardiogram research.

== Biography ==
Pardee was born on December 11, 1886, to Ensign Bennet Pardee, a physician. He was a grandnephew of Charles Inslee Pardee, former dean of the New York Medical College, and a direct descendant of William Brewster and William Bradford of the Plymouth Colony.

He received his A.B. from Columbia College at age 18 and then received a M.D. from the Columbia University College of Physicians and Surgeons. While completing his internship at New York Hospital, Pardee began research on heart disease using Willem Einthoven's prototype electrocardiograph. In 1912, he started working at Medical Clinic of New York Hospital, which is now Weill Cornell Medical Center.

During World War I, Pardee served as a captain in the United States Army Medical Corps. He worked with British cardiologist Thomas Lewis to determine the symptoms of feigned or true heart seizure among patients.

Pardee was known for his research on the electrocardiographic recognition and characterization of myocardial infarction and ischemia. He was the first to describe the constant changes in electrocardiograms in coronary diseases in 1920, and he was the namesake of Pardee's sign, which is a takeoff of the T wave from the descending R wave that is above the electrocardiographic baseline, and Pardee's wave.

Pardee taught at Cornell University Medical College and the New York Polyclinic Medical School and Hospital. He was also a fellow of the American Medical Association.

== Personal life ==
Pardee married Dorothy Dwight Porter, daughter of Henry Hobart Porter, former president of American Water Works. She was a niece of Seton Porter, founder and chairman of National Distillers. Porter served as a nurse at the American Ambulance Hospital in Neuilly, France, and at a French hospital in Cogny, France, in 1916-17.

Pardee died on February 28, 1973, at his 770 Park Avenue apartment at age 86. His brother, Irving Hotchkiss Pardee, married Abby Rockefeller Mauzé until his death in 1949.
