= Irving H. Pardee =

American neurologist (1892–1949)

- Born: Irving Hotchkiss Pardee; January 26, 1892
- Died: April 10, 1949 (aged 57)
- Education: Columbia College; Columbia Medical School
- Occupation: Neurologist
- Spouses: Margaret E. Trevor (m. 1917, divorced) Abby Rockefeller (m. 1946)
- Children: 3
- Relatives: Harold E. B. Pardee (brother)
- Medical career
- Institutions: St. Luke's Hospital; New York Neurological Institute; Columbia Medical School

Irving Hotchkiss Pardee (January 26, 1892 – April 10, 1949) was an American neurologist.

== Biography ==
Pardee came from a long line of physicians. He was born to Dr. Ensign Bennet Pardee on January 26, 1892, and his brother was the cardiologist Harold E. B. Pardee. His granduncle Charles Inslee Pardee was dean of the New York Medical College. He was also a descendant of William Brewster and William Bradford of the Plymouth Colony.

Pardee received his A.B. from Columbia College in 1912 and M.D. from the Columbia University College of Physicians & Surgeons in 1915. He interned at the St. Luke's Hospital, then the Neurological Institute of New York.

During World War I, Pardee entered the United States Medical Corps as a first lieutenant. Upon returning to the United States, Pardee carried out research in neurology and endocrinology and served in thee endocrine clinic at the Neurological Institute for a number of years and served as chief of clinic. He was also attending neurologist at St. Luke's and secretary of the hospital's medical board.

He helped found the Association for Research in Nervous and Mental Disease, of which he was vice president, and was also a member and vice president of the American Neurological Association in 1942. He was also president of the New York Neurological Society.

Pardee later became professor of neurology and executive officer of the department of neurology at Columbia University.

== Personal life ==
Pardee married Margaret E. Trevor, daughter of sportsman Henry Graff Trevor, a founder the Shinnecock Hills Golf Club. She was also a granddaughter of businessman John Bond Trevor, a great-granddaughter of Congressman Isaac C. Delaplaine, as well as niece of John B. Trevor Sr. and grand-niece of Lispenard Stewart. The couple had three children before divorcing. One of his daughters was Peggy Bates, a Monterey, California-based philanthropist who was married to Dr. Talcott Bates, a grandson of James Talcott and descendant of John Talcott and Thomas Hooker, founder of the Connecticut Colony.

Pardee then married Abby Rockefeller, daughter of John D. Rockefeller Jr. and granddaughter of the John D. Rockefeller, in 1946. They remained married until his death of leukemia on April 10, 1949.

He was a member of the Union Club of the City of New York and the Piping Rock Club.
