= Blanchette Ferry Rockefeller =

American art sponsor (1909–1992)

- Born: Blanchette Ferry Hooker; October 2, 1909; New York City, New York, U.S.
- Died: November 29, 1992 (aged 83); Briarcliff Manor, New York, U.S.
- Burial place: Rockefeller Family Cemetery, Sleepy Hollow, New York, U.S.
- Spouse: John Davison Rockefeller III (m. 1932; died 1978)
- Children: 4, including John IV, Hope, and Alida
- Parent(s): Elon Huntington Hooker; Blanche Ferry

Blanchette Ferry Rockefeller (née Hooker; October 2, 1909 – November 29, 1992) was an American art sponsor who served twice as president of the Museum of Modern Art. She was also the wife of John D. Rockefeller III and mother of Jay Rockefeller.

== Biography ==
Blanchette Ferry Hooker was born in Manhattan in New York City on October 2, 1909. She was the daughter of Elon Huntington Hooker, founder of Hooker Chemical Company, and his wife, Blanche Ferry.

She graduated from Miss Chapin's School in 1927, where she was president of the student government. She graduated from Vassar College in 1931 with an A.B. in music. On November 11, 1932, she married John D. Rockefeller III, a scion of the prominent Rockefeller family, at Riverside Church in New York City. They had four children, three daughters and one son:

- Sandra Ferry Rockefeller (1935–2024)
- John Davison "Jay" Rockefeller IV (1937–2026)
- Hope Aldrich Rockefeller (born 1938)
- Alida Ferry Rockefeller (born 1948)

Blanchette devoted her time to community service, education, and the arts - in particular the collection of Asian and American art. "She had been active in the affairs of the Museum of Modern Art since 1949 and was elected a member of the Board of Trustees in December 1952. In 1958, at a time when many Americans derided modern art or thought it communist and subversive, Rockefeller lent her support to the International Program that helped send The New American Painting, the first major exhibition of Abstract Expressionism, to eight European cities."

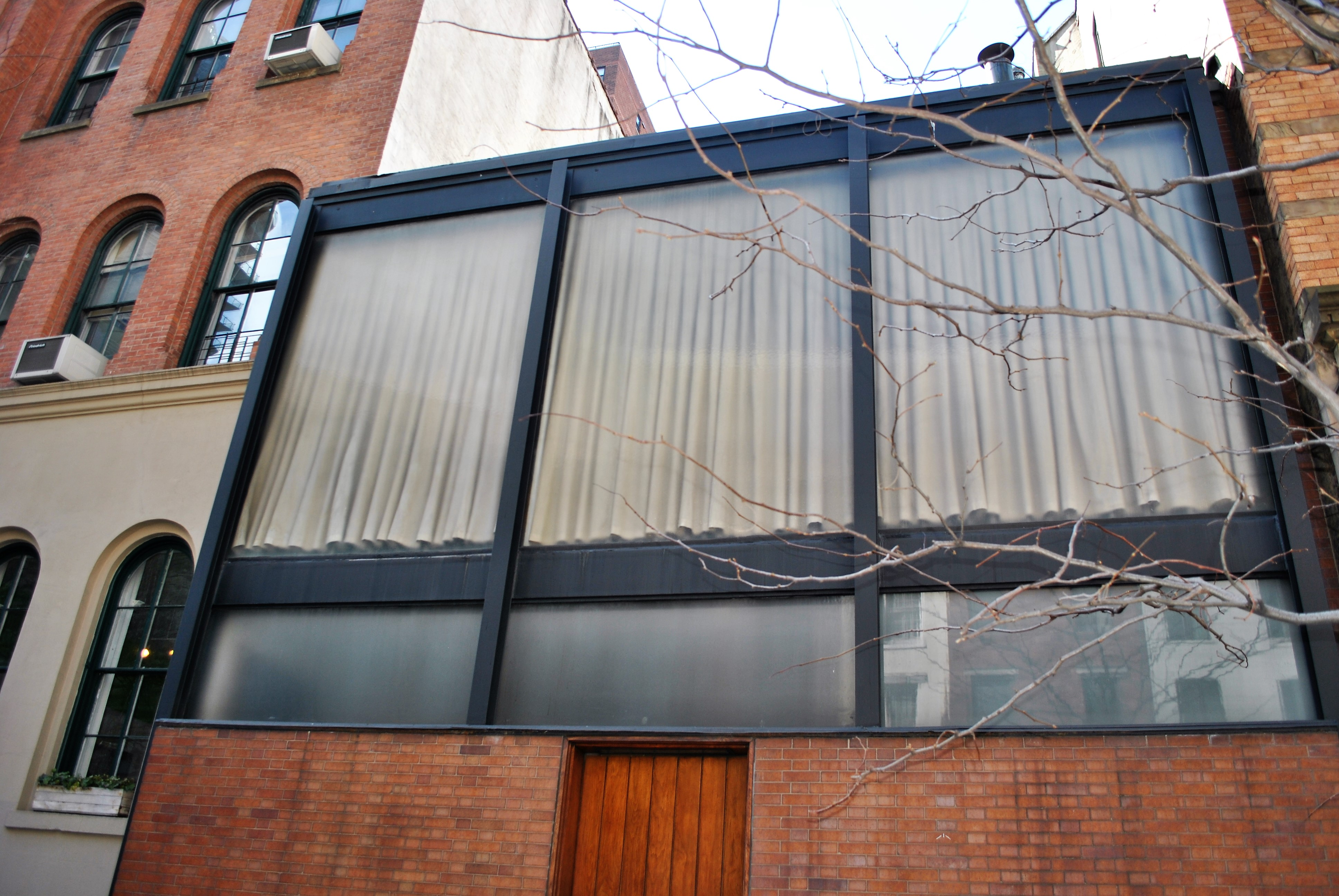
Blanchette Hooker Rockefeller Guest House, New York City

In 1948, Blanchette Rockefeller commissioned the Rockefeller Guest House by architect Philip Johnson. Located at 242 East 52nd Street next to the Turtle Bay Music School, it was one of the first residential buildings in New York City to reflect the influence of the Modern movement. The 1950 guest house was a place in which she could display her modern art collection and entertain friends. The Rockefellers donated the house (historically landmarked in 2000) to the Museum of Modern Art in 1955.

"Blanchette Rockefeller provided enlightened leadership to MoMA as president of the museum from 1972 through 1985. Two of her most important gifts were Willem de Kooning’s Woman II (1952) and Clyfford Still’s Painting (1951), an Abstract-Expressionist landscape. The Abstract Expressionist galleries on the second floor are named in her honor. In 1979 Rockefeller accepted an Oscar on behalf of MoMA's work in film."

The Rockefellers maintained homes in New York City and at "Fieldwood Farm" in the expansive Rockefeller family estate of Pocantico (see Kykuit in Westchester County, New York.

She died in her home near Briarcliff Manor, New York, of pneumonia, a complication of Alzheimer's disease, on November 29, 1992, at the age of 83. Blanchette was buried at the Rockefeller Family Cemetery, Sleepy Hollow, New York. The Blanchette Rockefeller Neurosciences Institute (BRNI) at West Virginia University in Morgantown, West Virginia is named in her honor.

== See also ==
- Rockefeller family
- John D. Rockefeller III
- Kykuit
