= Alida Rockefeller Messinger =

American philanthropist

- Born: Alida Ferry Rockefeller; 1948 (age 77–78); New York, U.S.
- Political party: Democratic
- Spouses: Mark Dayton (m. 1978; div. 1986): William Messinger
- Children: 3
- Parent(s): John D. Rockefeller III; Blanchette Ferry Hooker
- Relatives: Rockefeller family

Alida Rockefeller Messinger (born 1948) is an American philanthropist. Messinger is also a member of the Rockefeller family fortune. A donor to Democratic candidates and environmentalist causes, she is the former wife of former Minnesota governor and former U.S. Senator Mark Dayton, and also sister to former West Virginia governor and former U.S. Senator Jay Rockefeller. She has been a major donor to progressive political causes in her home state of Minnesota.

Outside of activism, she is a former trustee of the Rockefeller Family Fund, a public charity started by her father and his siblings. Her patrilineal great-grandfather is John D. Rockefeller, the founder of the Standard Oil Company and widely considered to be the wealthiest American of all time and the richest person in history.

== Early life and family ==
Alida Rockefeller was born in 1948. She is the youngest daughter of John Davison Rockefeller III (1906–1978) and Blanchette Ferry Hooker (1909–1992), and a fourth-generation member of the Rockefeller family.

She was the youngest of four children:

- Sandra Ferry Rockefeller (October 14, 1935 – October 25, 2024)
- John Davison "Jay" Rockefeller IV (June 18, 1937 – November 6, 2026)
- Hope Aldrich Rockefeller (born May 17, 1938)
- Alida Ferry Rockefeller (born 1948)

Messinger's father began to teach her about philanthropy when she was five years old. She has said, "My father and mother's greatest fear was that their four children might take their wealth for granted and grow up spoiled and arrogant ... They wanted us to learn early that with wealth comes responsibility."

== Philanthropy ==
Messinger is a major donor to conservation and environmental organizations. Her Alida R. Messinger Charitable Trust also funds conservation and environmental groups, as does the Rockefeller Family Fund, founded in 1967, of which she is a trustee.

Messinger also contributes financially to the Center for Public Integrity. She is a significant political donor to progressive and Democratic causes, donating millions of dollars.

== Personal life ==
From 1978 to 1986, she was married to Mark Dayton (b. 1947), a son of Bruce Dayton, who was part of a family that started the retail store that eventually became Target. Dayton later served as a United States senator for Minnesota from 2001 until 2007 and as Governor of Minnesota from 2011 to 2019. Before divorcing in 1986, Messinger and Dayton had two sons together, Eric and Andrew Dayton.

After the divorce, she married William Messinger, president of Aureus, an addiction recovery organization. They have one daughter.

== See also ==
- Rockefeller family
