= Martha Baird Rockefeller =

American pianist and philanthropist (1895–1971)

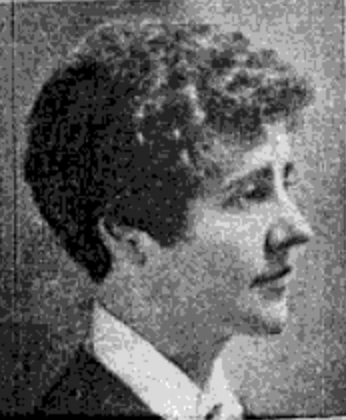
- Martha Baird in 1929
- Born: Martha Baird; March 15, 1895; Madera, California, U.S.
- Died: January 24, 1971 (aged 75); New York City, U.S.
- Occupations: Concert pianist, arts advocate, and philanthropist
- Known for: Martha Baird Rockefeller Fund for Music (1957–1982)
- Spouses: Adrian van Laar (m. 1920; div. 1925) Arthur Moulton Allen (m. 1930; died 1950) John D. Rockefeller Jr. (m. 1951; died 1960)

Martha Baird Rockefeller (March 15, 1895 – January 24, 1971) was an American pianist, philanthropist, and advocate for the arts.

== Formative years ==
Born in Madera, California on March 15, 1895, Martha Baird was the second-oldest child of merchant William F. Baird (1862–1916) and his wife Almina Abby Smith (1860–1903), a piano and organ instructor at the University of Southern California's College of Music.

Her mother, who was known to family and friends as "Mina", was her first piano instructor. Her initial classroom experiences were undertaken at the Westside School on what is now the site of Madera High School.

At the age of eight, her world was transformed dramatically by two major events – her first public performance as a pianist in June 1903 and the untimely death of her mother later that year. During the recital, which was held at the university where her mother taught, she performed "In the Gypsies' Camp."

Following her mother's death at the age of 43, she endured further upheaval when her banker father made the decision to leave Madera behind following a failed land deal that had made headlines statewide. After relocating with her father to Pittsburgh, she continued to study the piano while completing her high school education at the Blairsville School for Girls in Indiana County, Pennsylvania, and undergraduate training at Occidental College in Los Angeles.

By 1915, she was enrolled in the New England Conservatory of Music in Boston, Massachusetts, where she placed first in the conservatory's annual piano competition in 1917 and then graduated summa cum laude from the conservatory's soloist program. Also in 1917, she made her debut in recital at Jordan Hall in Boston on November 17, garnering solid reviews from the arts sections of major newspapers, including The Boston Globe. She then pursued advanced studies in Berlin with the pianist Artur Schnabel.

== Performance career and philanthropy ==
In 1918, she toured with Australian soprano Nellie Melba. Three years after her Boston success, Martha Baird performed before New York City audiences for the first time, appearing at the Princess Theater on March 22, 1920. On August 4 of that same year, she wed importer Adrian van Laar, but the union was not a lasting one; the couple divorced in 1925.

It was during this time, however, that her performing career began to succeed, led by a busy touring schedule across Europe and the United States. According to The New York Times, "she made her London debut at the Royal Albert Hall with Sir Thomas Beecham and the London Symphony Orchestra" in 1926, and then also "appeared with the Boston Symphony Orchestra under the late Serge Koussevitzky."

Her second marriage — to lawyer Arthur Moulton Allen — was a far more successful one. They remained a couple from the time of their wedding day (May 20, 1930) until her husband's death on May 6, 1950. Although she concertized periodically during this phase of her life, her greatest contributions to the arts came in the form of advocacy and philanthropy. In addition to her longtime service as the president of the Providence Community Concert Association in Rhode Island, she also was actively involved in fostering the outreach by the Providence Symphony Orchestra to area youth through concerts and other initiatives, and served on the board of trustees for her alma mater, the New England Conservatory.

Her third and final marriage – to John D. Rockefeller Jr. – enabled her to take her philanthropic work to even greater heights. On the day of her marriage (August 15, 1951) to the longtime friend of her late husband and fellow widower, she was given a sizeable trust fund by Rockefeller, which she used to establish the Martha Baird Rockefeller Fund for Music in 1957. When her third husband died in 1960, she then redirected a significant portion of her $48 million inheritance to that fund. In operation until 1982, the Martha Baird Rockefeller Fund for Music provided critical scholarship and grant support to solo artists and ensembles for a quarter of a century before it was dissolved.

Among her beneficiaries, according to The New York Times, were the: "Boston Symphony Orchestra, the City Center of Music and Drama, Lincoln Center for the Performing Arts, the Manhattan School of Music, the Metropolitan Opera Association, the Symphony of the New World, and the New England Conservatory of Music. During the 1969–1970 season, she made gifts for the City Center's new production of Rigoletto and for the Metropolitan's new mountings of Norma and Der Freischütz.'"

A governor of the American Red Cross, she also "supported organizations of special interest to her late husband", including "Colonial Williamsburg, Harvard Divinity School, the Riverside Church, Brown University, the Metropolitan Museum of Art, the National Council of Churches and the Sealantic Fund."

== Death and interment ==
Martha Baird Rockefeller died from a coronary occlusion at the age of 75 on January 24, 1971, at her home at 740 Park Avenue in Manhattan, New York. Following private funeral services, she was laid to rest at the Rockefeller Family Cemetery in Sleepy Hollow, Westchester County, New York.

Although she bore no children of her own, she had six stepchildren, including John D. Rockefeller III, Nelson Rockefeller, Laurance Rockefeller, Winthrop Rockefeller and David Rockefeller.
