= Elon Huntington Hooker =

Founder of Hooker Electrochemical company

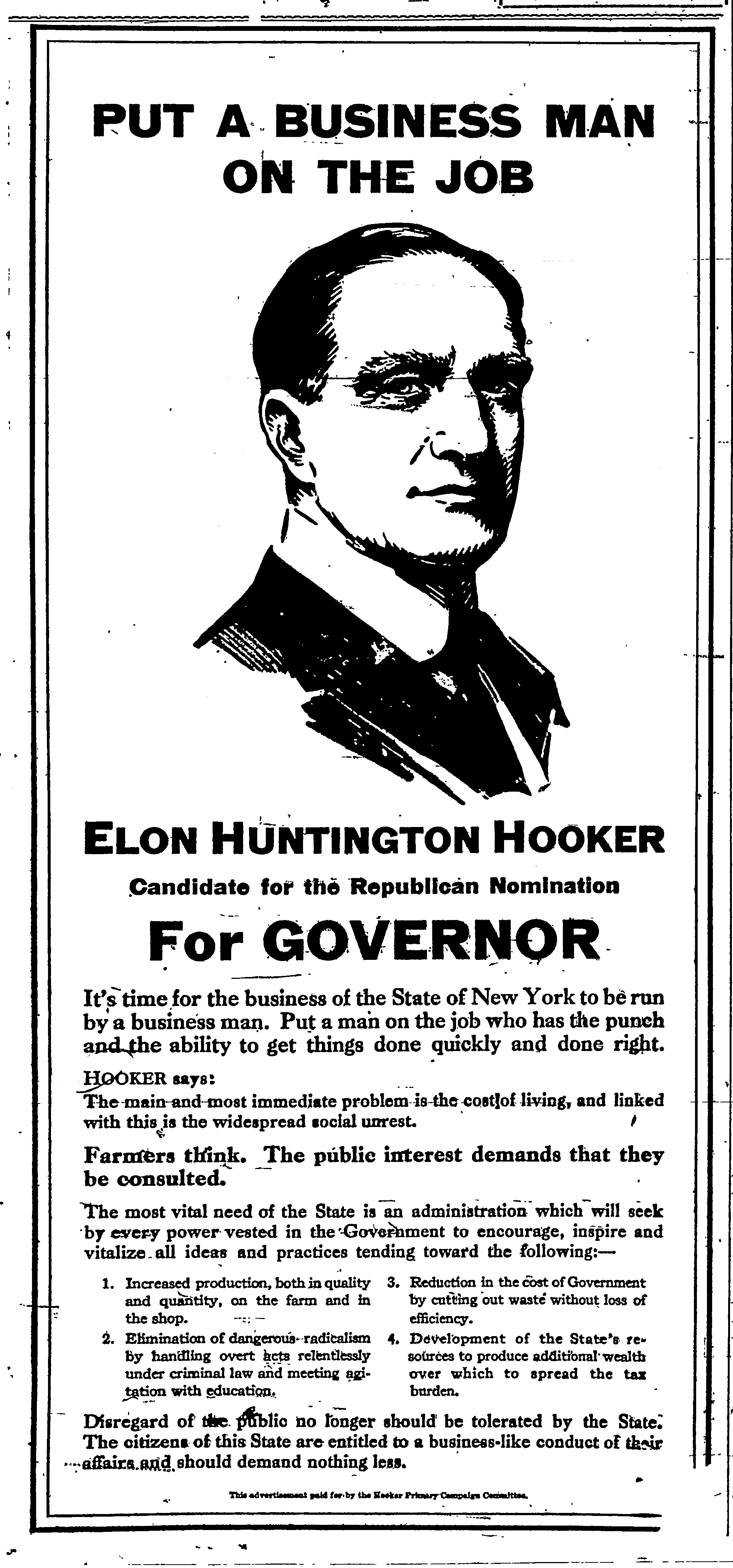
- Born: December 23, 1869; Rochester, New York, U.S.
- Died: May 10, 1938 (aged 68)
- Spouse: Blanche Ferry
- Children: Blanchette Ferry Rockefeller; Helen Hooker

Elon Huntington Hooker (December 23, 1869 – May 10, 1938) was the founder of Hooker Electrochemical Company.

== Biography ==
From a New England family, Elon Hooker obtained degrees in civil engineering from the University of Rochester and Cornell University. In 1912, he was named treasurer of the Progressive Party. In 1920, he unsuccessfully sought the Republican Party nomination for Governor of New York.

== Hooker Electrochemical Company ==
The company was opened in 1905 and produced chlor-alkali chemicals by electrolysis of salt with the Townsend cell using the hydro electric power of the nearby power plants. The company was located on Buffalo Avenue, Niagara Falls, New York. In 1968 it was bought by Occidental Petroleum Corporation.
