= Walter Bareiss =

Walter Bareiss (1919 – 23 April 2007) was a German-American businessman and art collector known for classical, African and contemporary art.

Bareiss (pronounced BAH-rice) was born in Tübingen, (Germany), in 1919. A lifelong collector, he bought his first Picasso etching in Zurich at age 13. He came to the United States in 1937 and graduated with a bachelor's degree in business science from Yale University in 1940. The family's textile manufacturing business was sold in 1984.

He began collecting African art in 1948, when he bid on behalf of the Museum of Modern Art for several pieces auctioned in Stuttgart, Germany. He and his wife Molly Stimson Bareiss compiled over 9,000 pieces for the Walter and Molly Bareiss Collection and created the traveling exhibition Kilengi: African Art from the Bareiss Family Collection.

Many of the artworks that passed through Bareiss are now in major museums. Examples include Annunciation by Maurice Denis and Landscape with Water Mill by Cézanne at the Yale University Art Gallery, The Laundress by Edgar Degas at the Norton Simon Museum, Streetlife in Dresden by Ernst Ludwig Kirchner at the MoMa, Bull Skull, Fruit, Pitcher by Picasso at the Cleveland Museum of Art and Man with a Lollipop by Pablo Picasso at the Metropolitan Museum of Art among many others.

Over the years, he assembled a collection of about 1,800 limited-edition artist's books, which he donated to the Toledo Museum of Art in Ohio. His collection of classical Greek ceramics was bought by the J. Paul Getty Museum in 1984 and includes a black figure vase whose painter was nicknamed "the Bareiss Painter."

Bareiss died of congestive heart failure in Stamford, Connecticut.
