= John D. Rockefeller III =

American philanthropist (1906–1978)

- Born: John Davison Rockefeller III; March 21, 1906; New York City, New York, U.S.
- Died: July 10, 1978 (aged 72); Mount Pleasant, New York, U.S.
- Burial place: Rockefeller Family Cemetery; Sleepy Hollow, New York, U.S.
- Education: Princeton University (B.S.)
- Spouse: Blanchette Ferry Hooker (m. 1932)
- Children: Sandra; John IV; Hope; Alida
- Parent(s): John Davison Rockefeller Jr. Abigail Greene Aldrich
- Relatives: See Rockefeller family

John Davison Rockefeller III (March 21, 1906 – July 10, 1978) was an American philanthropist. Rockefeller was the eldest son and second child of John D. Rockefeller Jr. and Abby Aldrich Rockefeller as well as a grandson of Standard Oil co-founder John D. Rockefeller. He was engaged in a wide range of philanthropic projects, many of which his family had launched, as well as supporting organizations related to East Asian affairs. Rockefeller was also a major supporter of the Population Council, and the committee that created the Lincoln Center in Manhattan.

== Early life ==
On March 21, 1906, John Davison Rockefeller III was born in New York City, New York. His parents were John Davison Rockefeller Jr. (1874–1960) and Abigail Greene "Abby" Aldrich (1874–1948), philanthropists. He had four younger brothers, Nelson, Winthrop, Laurance and David, and an elder sister, Abby. Through his father, he was a grandson of Standard Oil co-founder John Davison Rockefeller Sr. and schoolteacher Laura Celestia "Cettie" Spelman. Through his mother, he was a grandson of Senator Nelson Wilmarth Aldrich and Abigail Pearce Truman "Abby" Chapman.

He received his preparatory education at the Browning School in New York City and the Loomis Chaffee School, Windsor, Connecticut, in 1925. He went to Princeton University where he received high honors in economics and graduated in 1929 with the degree of Bachelor of Science, choosing industrial relations as the subject of his senior thesis. His interest in industrial relations stemmed from the family's role in the Ludlow Massacre, in which strikebreakers and security guards killed women and children of miners striking against the Rockefeller-controlled Colorado Fuel and Iron Company. Rockefeller's father worked to restore the family's public reputation by championing industrial relations and the work of William Lyon Mackenzie King, a pioneer in the field.

Commencing a lifelong commitment to international relations, he undertook a world tour after graduating from college, which concluded with assignments for the Institute of Pacific Relations conference in Japan.

== Institutional positions/activities ==
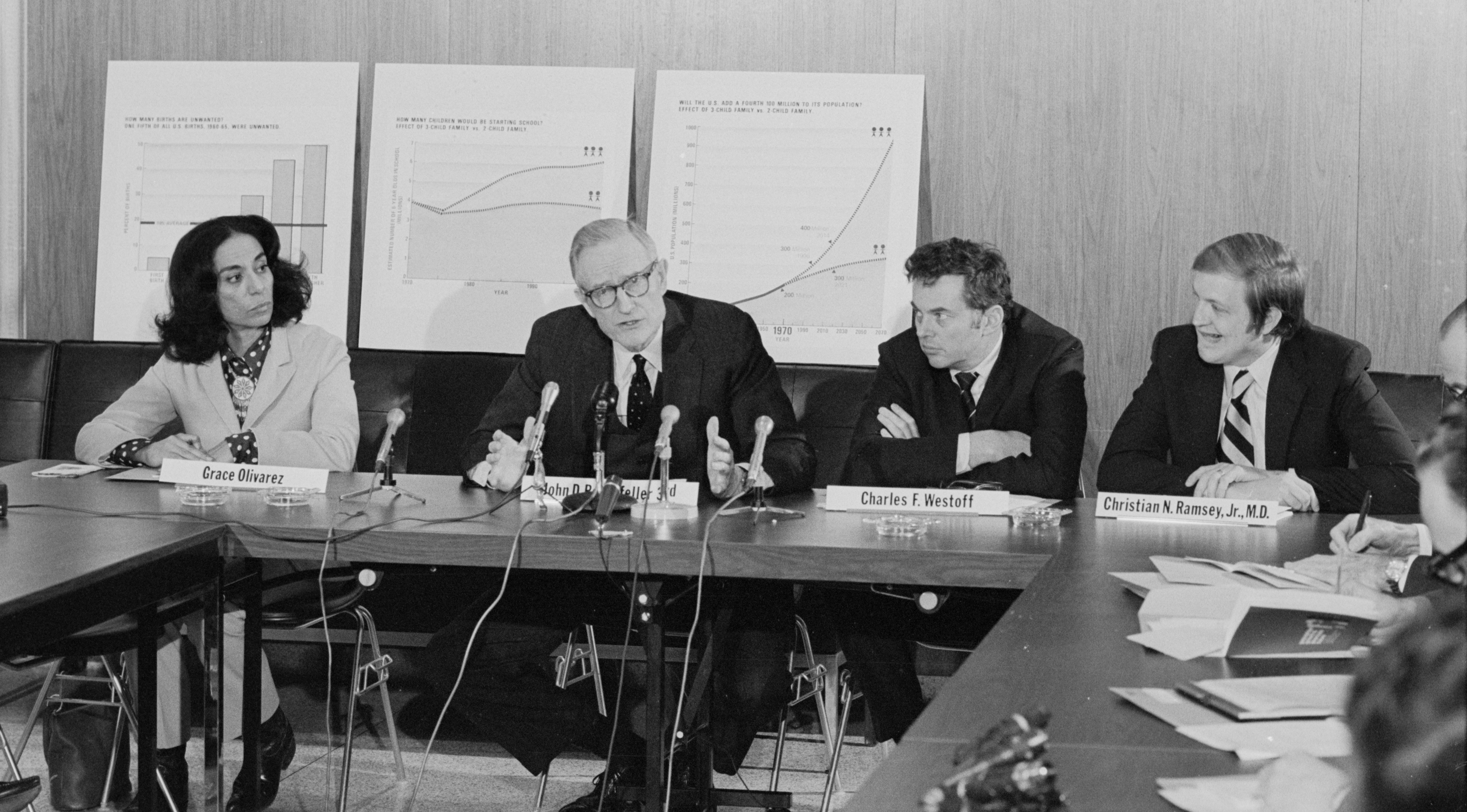
Rockefeller speaking at a Commission on Population Growth press conference in 1971

John III was the next Rockefeller manager for all family undertakings of social relevance. Since 1929, in total he sat on twenty boards of various institutions, most of which were family-related. The more notable of these were:

- Rockefeller University – then the Rockefeller Institute for Medical Research (established by Senior);
- Colonial Williamsburg (John Jr., Abby);
- Riverside Church (John Jr.);
- International House of New York (John Jr.);
- General Education Board – later the International Education Board (Senior);
- China Medical Board (John Sr., John Jr.);
- Bureau of Social Hygiene (John Jr.);
- Industrial Relations Counselors (John Jr.).

John III was at one time a member of the Council on Foreign Relations, the Foreign Policy Association and the Institute of Pacific Relations, as well as being on the board of directors of Princeton University. In late 1950, he accompanied secretary of state John Foster Dulles and Douglas MacArthur on a trip to Japan to conclude a peace treaty, during which time he consulted with many Japanese leaders in practically every important sphere of that country's life.

He was a prominent third-generation family philanthropist in his own right and founder of the Asia Society, the major institution he established in 1956 to foster greater cooperation between Asia and the United States. He also founded the Population Council in 1952, and a reconstituted Japan Society. In addition, he set up the United Negro College Fund for the ongoing education of African Americans, carrying on the family tradition in this area with his grandfather's funding of the education of black women at Spelman College in Atlanta.

He was on his father's Advisory Committee in the family office, Room 5600. He was also president of the family's principal philanthropy run by family members, the Rockefeller Brothers Fund, from its inception in 1940 to 1956. In 1929, he joined the family's renowned Rockefeller Foundation; elected to the board in 1931 he subsequently became chairman of this major philanthropic organization for twenty years and was responsible for changing the focus of the institution.

The principal philanthropic institution he created was the JDR III Fund in 1963, its major program being the Asian Cultural Program, created in 1967 to encourage East-West cultural exchange. The Fund was wound-up upon his death in 1979, but the Cultural Program continued as the Asian Cultural Council, which has provided grant assistance to more than 4,000 Asians and Americans in the area of the arts. Funding for its programs is derived from a combination of endowment income and contributions from individuals, foundations and corporations in the United States and Asia.

In the mid-1950s, John III assumed the leadership of the Exploratory Committee for a Musical Arts Center, a committee of civic leaders who were working to create what would become Lincoln Center. He was the key figure in the fund-raising efforts and in forging a consensus among the civic leaders and others who were essential to its success. The Center itself was built over a period from 1959 to 1969. He was its second president, commencing in 1956, and he became its chairman in 1961. He was chairman until 1970 when he was duly elected honorary chairman.

In the late 1960s, Rockefeller III was responsible for the creation of the Commission on Foundations and Private Philanthropy (usually known as the Peterson Commission, headed by Peter G. Peterson) and the Commission on Private Philanthropy and Public Needs (usually known as the Filer Commission). He established the Rockefeller Public Service Awards in 1958. In 1959, he received The Hundred Year Association of New York's Gold Medal Award "in recognition of outstanding contributions to the City of New York". In 1976, he received the S. Roger Horchow Award for Greatest Public Service by a Private Citizen, an award given out annually by Jefferson Awards.

Rockefeller III was chairman of the Commission on Population Growth and the American Future, which was created to provide recommendations to the United States government regarding population growth and its social consequences. The Commission was established by Congress in 1970 and submitted its final recommendations in 1972.

== Posthumous honors ==
Rockefeller College at Princeton University was named in his honor in 1982.

The John D. Rockefeller III National Tournament of Elementary School State Champions, an annual national-championship chess tournament run by US Chess, was named in his honor in 2020.

== Personal life ==
On November 11, 1932, he married the socially connected Blanchette Ferry Hooker (1909–1992), who was to serve as chairman of the Asian Cultural Council from 1980 to 1990, and who established the Blanchette H. Rockefeller Fellowship Fund, in Japan. They had 4 children, three daughters and one son:

- Sandra Ferry Rockefeller (1935–2024)
- John Davison "Jay" Rockefeller IV – a former U.S. Senator from West Virginia and a former two-term governor of that state (1937–2026)
- Hope Aldrich Rockefeller (b. 1938)
- Alida Ferry Rockefeller (b. 1948)

=== Death ===
Rockefeller was killed in an automobile accident in Mount Pleasant, New York (near the Rockefeller family estate in Pocantico), on July 10, 1978, at the age of 72. He is buried at the Rockefeller Family Cemetery in Sleepy Hollow, New York.

== See also ==
- Rockefeller family
- Rockefeller Foundation
- Rockefeller University
- Rockefeller Brothers Fund

Non-profit organization positions
New title	President of the Population Council; 1952–1956	Succeeded by Frederick Osborn
Preceded by John Foster Dulles	Chairman of the Rockefeller Foundation; 1952–1971	Succeeded by C. Douglas Dillon
New title	President of the Asia Society; 1956–1964	Succeeded by Kenneth T. Young
Preceded by Grayson L. Kirk	Chairman of the Asia Society; 1964–1974	Succeeded by George W. Ball
