= Rockefeller Brothers Fund =

American philanthropic organization

Rockefeller Brothers Fund, Inc.
- Formation: 28 December 1940; 85 years ago
- Founders: John, Nelson, Laurance, Winthrop and David Rockefeller
- Type: Nonprofit
- Tax ID no.: 13-1760106
- Legal status: 501(c)(3) organization
- Purpose: Philanthropy
- Headquarters: New York, New York
- Methods: Grantmaking
- Key people: Stephen B. Heintz
- Endowment: $1.27 billion (2020)
- Website: www.rbf.org

The Rockefeller Brothers Fund (RBF) is a philanthropic foundation created and run by members of the Rockefeller family. It was founded in New York City in 1940 as the primary philanthropic vehicle for the five third-generation Rockefeller brothers: John, Nelson, Laurance, Winthrop and David. It is distinct from the Rockefeller Foundation. The Rockefellers are an industrial, political and banking family that made one of the world's largest fortunes in the oil business during the late 19th and early 20th centuries.

The Fund's stated mission is to "advance social change that contributes to a more just, sustainable, and peaceful world." The current president of RBF is Stephen Heintz, who was appointed to the post in 2000. Valerie Rockefeller serves as RBF's chairwoman. She succeeded Richard Rockefeller, the fifth child of David Rockefeller, who served as RBF's chairman until 2013.

The Rockefeller Brothers Fund is part of the Steering Group of the Foundations Platform F20, an international network of foundations and philanthropic organizations.

== History ==
The Rockefeller Brothers Fund was established in 1940 by the five sons of John D. Rockefeller Jr. The five Rockefeller brothers served as the Fund's first five trustees. In 1951, the Fund grew substantially when it received a $58 million endowment from John D. Rockefeller Jr.

Initially, the Rockefeller Brothers Fund pursued largely philanthropic interests. Laurance continued his father John D. Rockefeller II's interest in nature conservation, so that the fund's money expanded the family's Wyoming land trusts, which formed the basis of the Grand Teton National Park. Nelson continued his mother Abby Aldrich Rockefeller's interest in contemporary art, and the Rockefeller Brothers Fund became one of the largest supporters of the Museum of Modern Art. John D. Rockefeller was one of the pioneers of population policy, and the fund was one of the most important supporters of the Population Council.

In 1999, the Fund merged with the Charles E. Culpeper Foundation.

In November 2006, David Rockefeller pledged $225 million to the Fund that would create the David Rockefeller Global Development Fund after his death.

On September 30, 2014, the Rockefeller Brothers Fund announced that it planned to divest its assets from fossil fuels. On disinvesting from fossil fuels, the president of the Rockefeller Brothers Fund, Stephen Heintz, said: "We see this as both a moral imperative and an economic opportunity". Two years later, the Rockefeller Family Fund— a distinct, independent institution, as is the Rockefeller Brothers Fund—announced its pending divestment from fossil fuels, on March 23, 2016.

== Special Studies Project ==
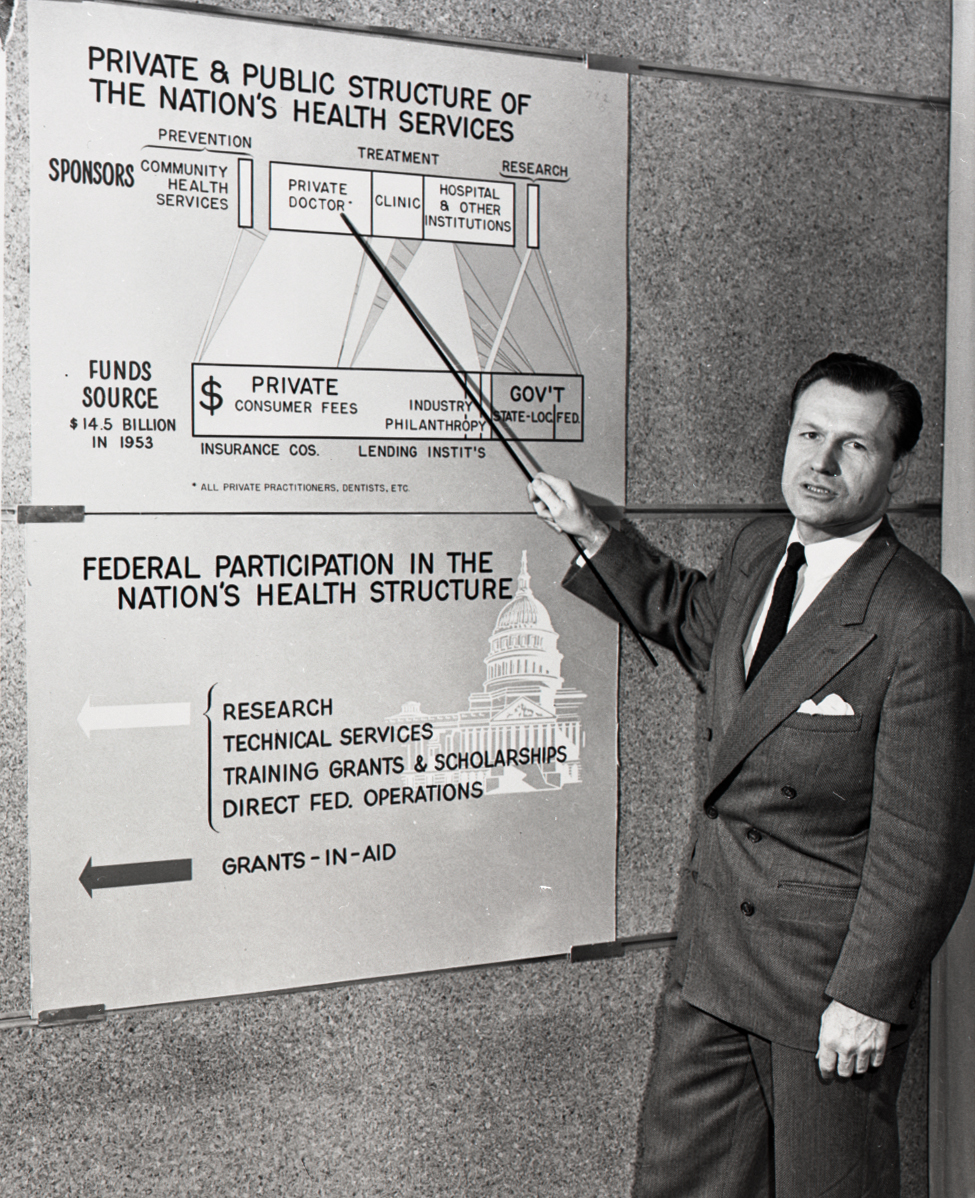
Nelson Rockefeller, 1954

From 1956 to 1960, the Fund financed a study conceived by its then president, Nelson Rockefeller, to analyze the challenges facing the United States. Henry Kissinger was recruited to direct the project. Seven panels were constituted that looked at issues including military strategy, foreign policy, international economic strategy, governmental reorganization, and the nuclear arms race.

The military subpanel's report was rush-released about two months after the USSR launched Sputnik in October 1957. Rockefeller urged the Republican Party to adopt the finding of the Special Studies Project as its platform. The findings of the project formed the framework of Nelson Rockefeller's 1960 presidential election platform. The project was published in its entirety in 1961 as Prospect for America: The Rockefeller Panel Reports. The archival study papers are stored in the Rockefeller Archive Center in Sleepy Hollow, New York.

== Funding of anti-Israel and pro-Palestinian organizations ==
Since 2011 the RBF has donated significant funds to support anti-Israel and pro-Palestinian organizations and protests. It has become the most important source of funding for the Boycott, Divestment and Sanctions (BDS) political campaign. Since 2013, RBF has donated at least $880,000 to groups such as Jewish Voice for Peace, Zochrot, and the U.S. Campaign for Palestinian Rights, which support BDS. Stephen B. Heintz, wrote in an email that such grants were needed to “end the fifty-year long occupation in order to bring justice, dignity, and freedom to all Israelis and Palestinians.”

Since 2018, the Rockefeller Brothers Fund has donated more than $3.4 million to groups such as Defense for Children International-Palestine, (DCI-P) which was designated a terrorist organization by the Israeli government in October 2021 for acting as an extension of the terrorist group Popular Front for the Liberation of Palestine (PFLP) with established ties to leading PFLP members. DCI-P general assembly president Nasser Ibrahim was the former editor of PFLP’s propaganda publication and has advocated for a Palestinian “right of resistance” including armed conflict. DCI-P director Rifat Odeh Kassis spoke at the funeral of a former DCI-P employee who had also fought as a PFLP insurgent. 16 From 2018 through 2023, the Rockefeller Brothers Fund reportedly donated $165,000 to DCI-P.

Since 2018, the Rockefeller Brothers Fund also donated $580,000 to Education for Just Peace in the Middle East, which, according to the Washington Free Beacon, has been accused of using its charity status to donate to terror group Hamas as well as similar Palestinian Liberation Organization (PLO)-linked organizations.

The Rockefeller Brothers Fund has also donated $490,000 to Jewish Voice for Peace since 2019, an anti-Israel advocacy group that claimed the Hamas attack on Israel on October 7 was due to “75 years of Israeli occupation and apartheid.” Roughly $2.2 million has been donated by the Fund towards several other organizations that have either justifying Hamas or blaming Israel for the terrorist attacks.

In 2023, the Rockefeller Brothers Fund awarded $50,000 grants to 7amleh-Arab Center for the Advancement of Social Media, Jewish Voice for Peace, and Adalah-The Legal Center for Arab Minority Rights In Israel; a $100,000 grant to Breaking the Silence, an Israel human rights group made up of ex-Israeli soldiers who allege the Israeli Defense Forces deliberately killed Palestinian civilians; $50,000 to the Common Defense Education Fund for anti-Israel activism; $75,000 for Education for Just Peace in the Middle East which is the parent organization of the US Campaign for Palestinian Rights; $60,000 to the Foundation for Middle East Peace, an anti-Israel group that has given grants to groups that support the BDS campaign against Israel; $75,000 to Grassroots Jerusalem, a Palestinian group operating in Jerusalem; $200,000 to the Middle East Policy Network, a Palestinian advocacy group; $68,500 to the New Israel Fund, a left-of-center grant maker; $74,823 to 972-Advancement of Citizen Journalism which is a joint Israeli-Palestinian independent media outlet; $30,000 to Nonviolence International for its project Center for Jewish Nonviolence; $60,000 to Playgrounds for Palestine; $45,000 to Israeli Democratic Bloc Ltd; and $100,000 to the Project on Middle East Democracy.

== Quincy Institute ==
In 2023, the Rockefeller Brothers Fund gave $100,000 to the Quincy Institute for Responsible Statecraft, a non-interventionist foreign policy think tank. Rockefeller Brothers Fund president Stephen Heintz also sits as chairman of the board of directors at the Quincy Institute. The Washington Free Beacon reported that the Quincy Institute has ties to the pro-Islamic Republic of Iran lobbying group National Iranian American Council (NIAC) through its former president Trita Parsi, who works as the Quincy Institute’s executive vice president and is backed by Francis Najafi, who is a donor to both groups and to numerous anti-Israel groups.

== Presidents ==
- Nelson Rockefeller (1956–1958)
- Laurance Rockefeller (1958–1968)
- Dana S. Creel (1968–1975)
- William M. Dietel (1975–1987)
- Colin G. Campbell (1987–2000)
- Stephen B. Heintz (2001-2026)
- Ian H. Solomon (since 2026)
