= John D. Rockefeller Jr. =

American financier and philanthropist (1874–1960)

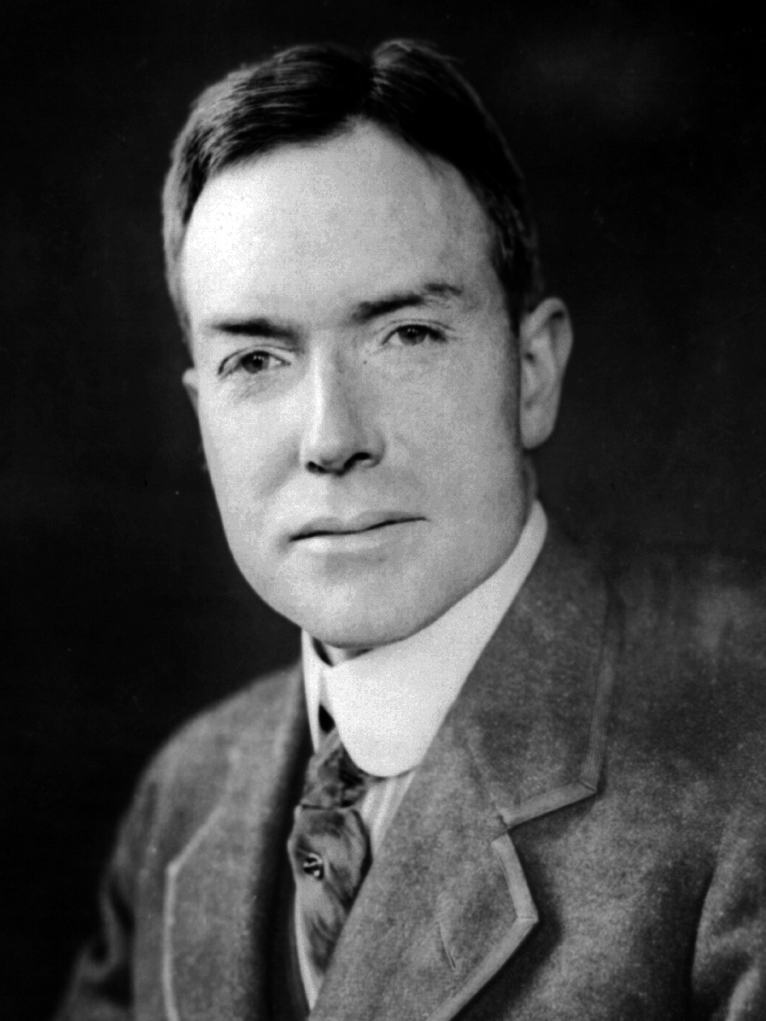
- Rockefeller in 1920
- Born: John Davison Rockefeller Jr. January 29, 1874; Cleveland, Ohio, U.S.
- Died: May 11, 1960 (aged 86); Tucson, Arizona, U.S.
- Education: Brown University (AB)
- Occupations: Financier; philanthropist
- Years active: 1897−1959
- Spouses: Abigail Greene Aldrich (m. 1901; died 1948) Martha Baird (m. 1951)
- Children: Abigail; John III; Nelson; Laurance; Winthrop; David
- Parents: John D. Rockefeller; Laura Spelman Rockefeller
- Relatives: Rockefeller family
- Awards: Public Welfare Medal (1943)

John Davison Rockefeller Jr. (January 29, 1874 – May 11, 1960) was an American financier and philanthropist. Rockefeller was the fifth child and only son of Standard Oil co-founder John D. Rockefeller. He was involved in the development of the vast office complex in Midtown Manhattan known as Rockefeller Center, making him one of the largest real estate holders in the city at that time. Towards the end of his life, he was famous for his philanthropy, donating over $500 million to a wide variety of different causes, including educational establishments. Among his projects was the reconstruction of Colonial Williamsburg in Virginia. He was widely blamed for having orchestrated the Ludlow Massacre and other offenses during the Colorado Coalfield War. Rockefeller was the father of six children: Abby, John III, Nelson, Laurance, Winthrop, and David.

== Early life and education ==
John Davison Rockefeller Jr. was born on January 29, 1874, in Cleveland, Ohio, the fifth and youngest child of Standard Oil co-founder John Davison Rockefeller Sr. and schoolteacher Laura Celestia "Cettie" Spelman. His four older sisters were Elizabeth (Bessie), Alice (who died an infant), Alta, and Edith. Living in his father's mansion at 4 West 54th Street, he attended Park Avenue Baptist Church at 64th Street (now Central Presbyterian Church) and the Browning School, a tutorial establishment set up for him and other children of associates of the family; it was located in a brownstone owned by the Rockefellers, on West 55th Street. His father John Sr. and uncle William Rockefeller Jr. co-founded Standard Oil together.

He initially intended to attend Yale University but was encouraged by William Rainey Harper, president of the University of Chicago, to instead attend Brown University, then a Baptist-oriented university. Nicknamed "Johnny Rock" by his roommates, Rockefeller joined both the Glee and the Mandolin clubs at Brown, taught a Bible class, and was elected junior class president. Scrupulously careful with money, he stood out as different from other rich men's sons. He joined the Alpha Delta Phi fraternity and was elected to Phi Beta Kappa. In 1897, after completing nearly a dozen social sciences courses, including one on Karl Marx's Das Kapital, Rockefeller graduated with a Bachelor of Arts from Brown University.

== Career ==
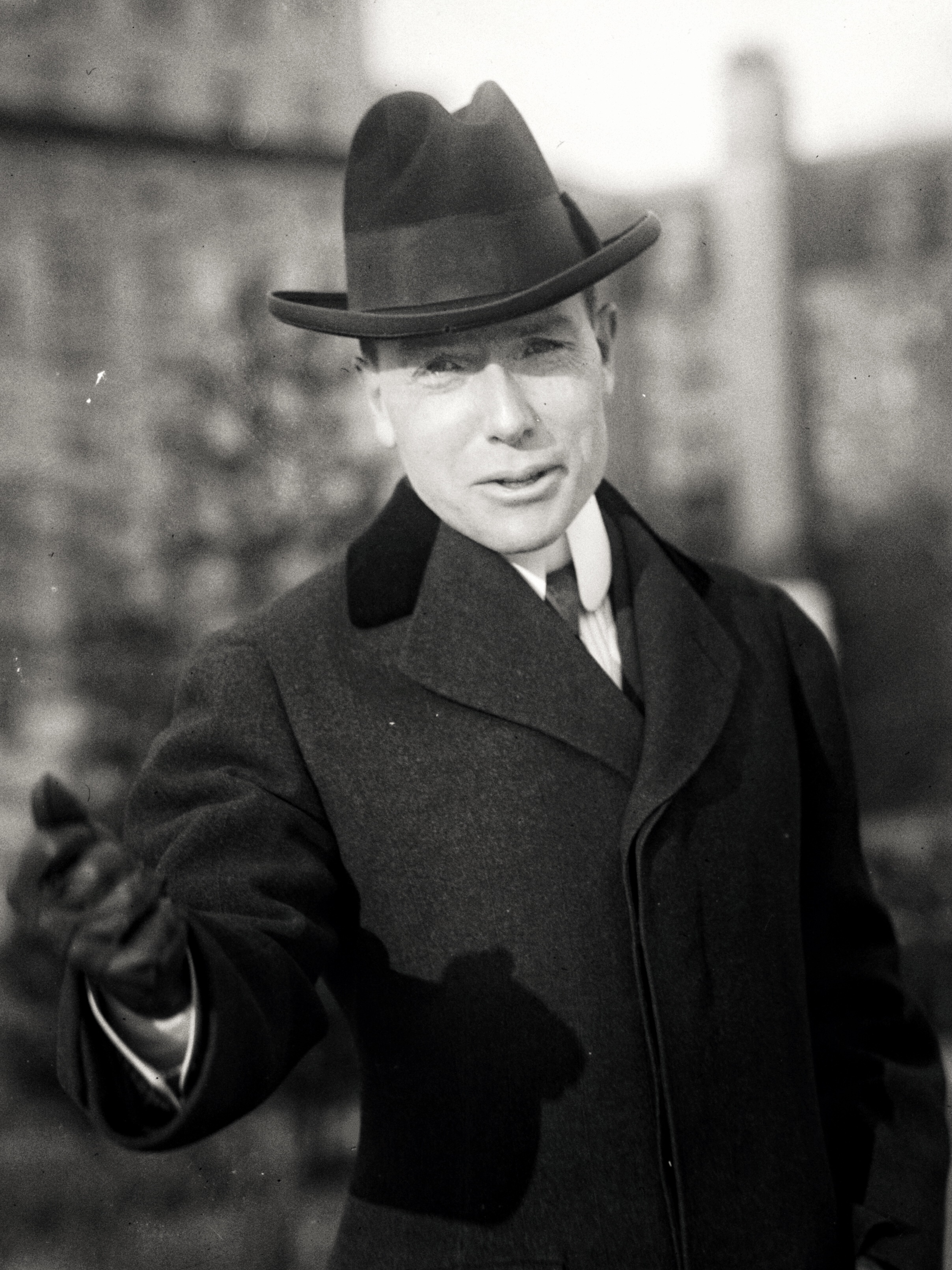
Rockefeller in 1920

After graduating from Brown, Rockefeller joined his father's business in October 1897, setting up operations in the newly formed family office at 26 Broadway in Manhattan, where he became a director of Standard Oil. He later also became a director at J. P. Morgan's U.S. Steel company, which had been formed in 1901. Junior resigned from both companies in 1910 in an attempt to "purify" his ongoing philanthropy from commercial and financial interests after the Hearst media empire unearthed a bribery scandal involving John Dustin Archbold (the successor to Senior as head of Standard Oil) and two prominent members of Congress.

In September 1913, the United Mine Workers of America declared a strike against the Colorado Fuel and Iron (CF&I) company in what would become the Colorado Coalfield War. Junior owned a controlling interest in CF&I (40% of its stock) and sat on the board as an absentee director. In April 1914, after a long period of industrial unrest, the Ludlow Massacre occurred at a tent camp occupied by striking miners. At least 20 men, women, and children died in the attack. This was followed by nine days of violence between miners, strikebreakers, and the Colorado National Guard. Although he did not order the attack that began this unrest, there are accounts to suggest Junior was mostly to blame for the violence, with the awful working conditions, death ratio, and no paid dead work which included securing unstable ceilings, workers were forced into working in unsafe conditions just to make ends meet. In January 1915, Junior was called to testify before the Commission on Industrial Relations. Many critics blamed Rockefeller for ordering the massacre. Margaret Sanger wrote an attack piece in her magazine The Woman Rebel, declaring, "But remember Ludlow! Remember the men and women and children who were sacrificed in order that John D. Rockefeller Jr., might continue his noble career of charity and philanthropy as a supporter of the Christian faith."

He was at the time being advised by the pioneer public relations expert, Ivy Lee, and William Lyon Mackenzie King. Lee warned that the Rockefellers were losing public support and developed a strategy that Junior followed to repair it. It was necessary for Junior to overcome his shyness, go personally to Colorado to meet with the miners and their families, inspect the conditions of the homes and the factories, attend social events, and especially to listen closely to the grievances. This was novel advice and attracted widespread media attention, which opened the way to resolve the conflict, and present a more humanized version of the Rockefellers. Mackenzie King said Rockefeller's testimony was the turning point in Junior's life, restoring the reputation of the family name; it also heralded a new era of industrial relations in the country.

During the Great Depression, he was involved in the financing, development, and construction of the Rockefeller Center, a vast office complex in midtown Manhattan, and as a result, became one of the largest real estate holders in New York City. He was influential in attracting leading blue-chip corporations as tenants in the complex, including GE and its then affiliates RCA, NBC and RKO, as well as Standard Oil of New Jersey (now ExxonMobil), Associated Press, Time Inc, and branches of Chase National Bank (now JP Morgan Chase).

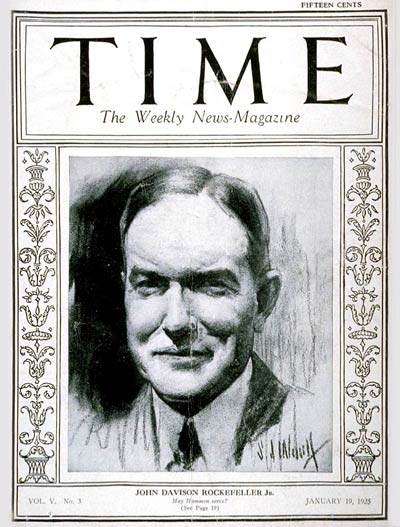
Rockefeller on the cover of Time magazine on January 19, 1925

The family office, of which he was in charge, shifted from 26 Broadway to the 56th floor of the landmark 30 Rockefeller Plaza upon its completion in 1933. The office formally became "Rockefeller Family and Associates" (and informally, "Room 5600").

In 1921, Junior received about 10% of the shares of the Equitable Trust Company from his father, making him the bank's largest shareholder. Subsequently, in 1930, Equitable merged with Chase National Bank, making Chase the largest bank in the world at the time. Although his stockholding was reduced to about 4% following this merger, he was still the largest shareholder in what became known as "the Rockefeller bank". As late as the 1960s, the family still retained about 1% of the bank's shares, by which time his son David had become the bank's president.

In the late 1920s, Rockefeller founded the Dunbar National Bank in Harlem. The financial institution was located within the Paul Laurence Dunbar Apartments at 2824 Eighth Avenue near 150th Street, servicing a primarily African-American clientele. It was unique among New York City financial institutions in that it employed African Americans as tellers, clerks and bookkeepers as well as in key management positions. However, the bank folded after only a few years of operation.

== Philanthropy and social causes ==
In a celebrated letter to Nicholas Murray Butler in June 1932, subsequently printed on the front page of The New York Times, Rockefeller, a lifelong teetotaler, argued against the continuation of the Eighteenth Amendment on the principal grounds of an increase in disrespect for the law. This letter became an important event in pushing the nation to repeal Prohibition.

Rockefeller was known for his philanthropy, giving over $537 million to a myriad of causes over his lifetimecompared to $240 million to his own family. He created the Sealantic Fund in 1938 to channel gifts to his favorite causes; previously his main philanthropic organization had been the Davison Fund. He had become the Rockefeller Foundation's inaugural president in May 1913 and proceeded to dramatically expand the scope of this institution, founded by his father. Later he would become involved in other organizations set up by Senior: Rockefeller University and the International Education Board.

In the social sciences, he founded the Laura Spelman Rockefeller Memorial in 1918, which was subsequently folded into the Rockefeller Foundation in 1929. A committed internationalist, he financially supported programs of the League of Nations and crucially funded the formation and ongoing expenses of the Council on Foreign Relations and its initial headquarters building in New York in 1921.

He established the Bureau of Social Hygiene in 1913, a major initiative that investigated such social issues as prostitution and venereal disease, as well as studies in police administration and support for birth control clinics and research. In 1924, at the instigation of his wife, he provided crucial funding for Margaret Sanger–who earlier had personally opposed him for his treatment of workers–in her work on birth control and involvement in population issues. He donated $5,000 to her American Birth Control League in 1924 and a second time in 1925.

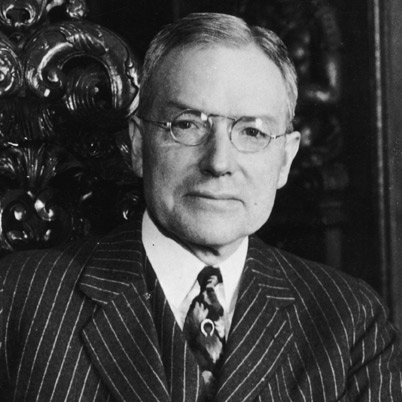
John D. Rockefeller Jr., financier

As part of his philanthropy for the arts, he gave extensive property he owned on West 54th Street in Manhattan for the site of the Museum of Modern Art, which had been co-founded by his wife in 1929.

In 1925, he purchased the George Grey Barnard collection of medieval art and cloister fragments for the Metropolitan Museum of Art. He also purchased land north of the original site, now Fort Tryon Park, for a new building, The Cloisters.

In November 1926, Rockefeller came to the College of William and Mary for the dedication of an auditorium built in memory of the organizers of Phi Beta Kappa, the honorary scholastic fraternity founded in Williamsburg in 1776. Rockefeller was a member of the society and had helped pay for the auditorium. He had visited Williamsburg the previous March, when the Reverend Dr. W. A. R. Goodwin escorted him—along with his wife Abby, and their sons, David, Laurance, and Winthrop—on a quick tour of the city. The outcome of his visit was that he approved the plans already developed by Goodwin and launched the massive historical restoration of Colonial Williamsburg on November 22, 1927. Amongst many other buildings restored through his largesse was The College of William & Mary's Wren Building and the Episcopalian Bruton Parish Church.

In 1940, Rockefeller hosted Bill Wilson, one of the original founders of Alcoholics Anonymous, and others at a dinner to tell their stories. "News of this got out on the world wires; inquiries poured in again and many people went to the bookstores to get the book, Alcoholics Anonymous." Rockefeller offered to pay for the publication of the book, but in keeping with AA traditions of being self-supporting, AA rejected the money.

Through negotiations by his son Nelson, in 1946 he bought for $8.5 million—from the major New York real estate developer William Zeckendorf—the land along the East River in Manhattan which he later donated for the United Nations headquarters. This was after he had vetoed the family estate at Pocantico as a prospective site for the headquarters (see Kykuit). Another UN connection was his early financial support for its predecessor, the League of Nations; this included a gift to endow a major library for the League in Geneva which today still remains a resource for the UN.

A confirmed ecumenicist, over the years he gave substantial sums to Protestant institutions, ranging from the Interchurch World Movement, the Federal Council of Churches, the Union Theological Seminary, the Cathedral of St. John the Divine, New York's Riverside Church, and the World Council of Churches. He was also instrumental in the development of the research that led to Robert and Helen Lynd's famous Middletown studies work that was conducted in the city of Muncie, Indiana, that arose out of the financially supported Institute of Social and Religious Research.

Following his involvement in the Ludlow Massacre, Rockefeller was a major initiator with his close friend and advisor William Lyon Mackenzie King of the nascent industrial relations movement; along with major chief executives of the time, he incorporated Industrial Relations Counselors (IRC) in 1926, a consulting firm whose main goal was to establish industrial relations as a recognized academic discipline at Princeton University and other institutions. It succeeded through the support of prominent corporate chieftains of the time, such as Owen D. Young and Gerard Swope of General Electric.

== Overseas philanthropy ==
In the 1920s, Rockefeller donated a substantial amount of money for the restoration and rehabilitation of major buildings in France that had been damaged in World War I, such as the Reims Cathedral, the Château de Fontainebleau and the Château de Versailles, for which in 1936 he was awarded France's highest decoration, the Grand-Croix de la Legion d'honneur, an honor also awarded decades later to his son David.

He also liberally funded the notable early excavations at Luxor in Egypt, and the American School of Classical Studies for excavation of the Agora and the reconstruction of the Stoa of Attalos, both in Athens; the American Academy in Rome; Lingnan University in China; St. Luke's International Hospital in Tokyo; the library of the Imperial University in Tokyo; and the Shakespeare Memorial Endowment at Stratford-on-Avon.

In addition, he provided the funding for the construction of the Palestine Archaeological Museum in East Jerusalem – the Rockefeller Museum – which today houses many antiquities and was the home of many of the Dead Sea Scrolls until they were moved to the Shrine of the Book at the Israel Museum.

== Conservation ==
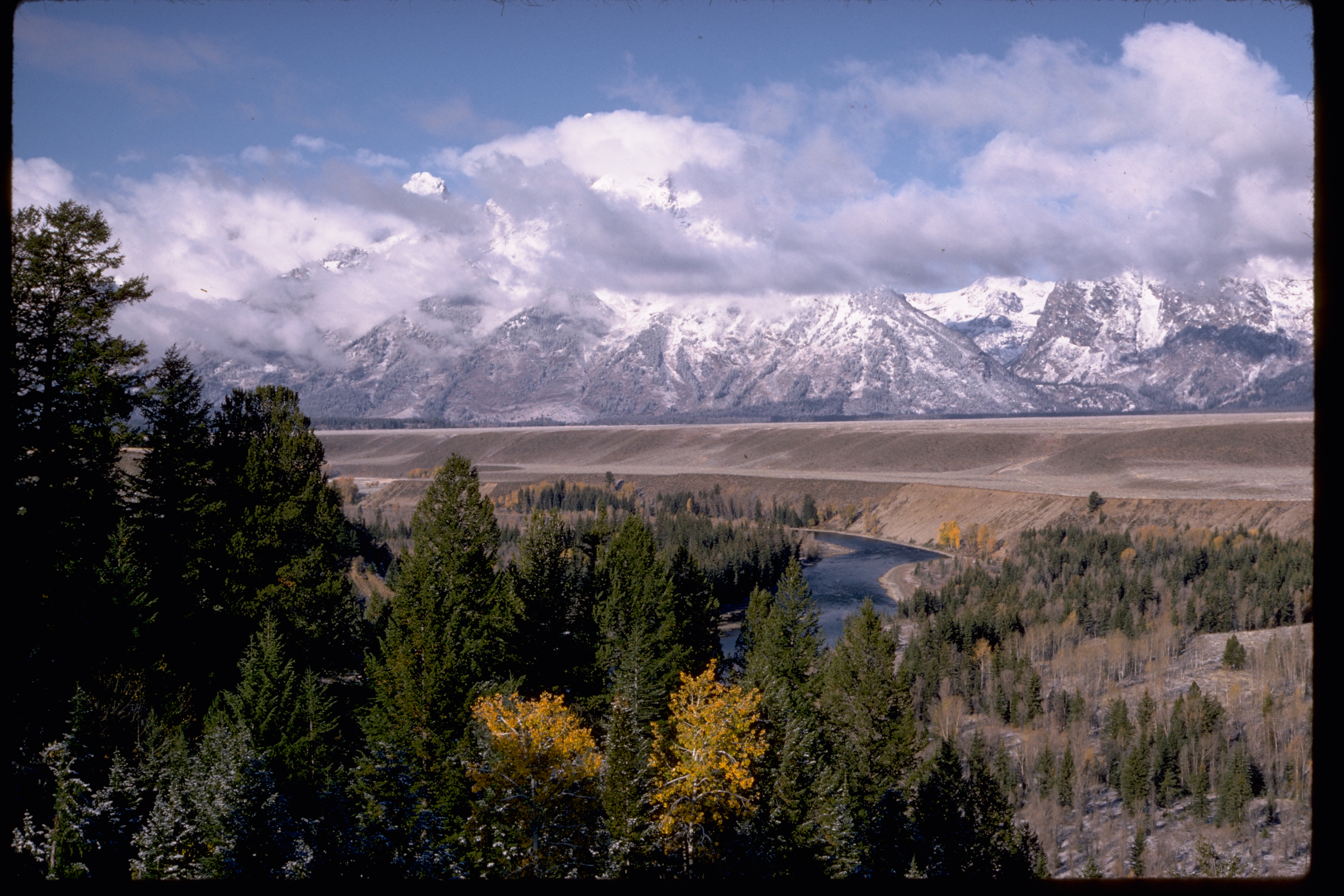
Teton Range and Snake River

Rockefeller had a special interest in conservation, and purchased and donated land for many American National Parks, including Grand Teton (hiding his involvement and intentions behind the Snake River Land Company), Mesa Verde National Park, Acadia, Great Smoky Mountains, Yosemite, and Shenandoah. In the case of Acadia National Park, he financed and engineered an extensive Carriage Road network throughout the park. Both the John D. Rockefeller Jr. Memorial Parkway that connects Yellowstone National Park to the Grand Teton National Park and the Rockefeller Memorial in the Great Smoky Mountains National Park were named after him. He was also active in the movement to save redwood trees, making a significant contribution to Save the Redwoods League in the 1920s to enable the purchase of what would become the Rockefeller Forest in Humboldt Redwoods State Park. In 1930, Rockefeller helped the federal government extend Yosemite National Park's boundary 15,570 acres (63.0 km^{2}) by purchasing tracts held by timber companies for about $3.3 million, covering half the cost.

In 1951, he established Sleepy Hollow Restorations, which brought together under one administrative body the management and operation of two historic sites he had acquired: Philipsburg Manor House in North Tarrytown, now called Sleepy Hollow (acquired in 1940 and donated to the Tarrytown Historical Society), and Sunnyside, Washington Irving's home, acquired in 1945. He bought Van Cortland Manor in Croton-on-Hudson in 1953 and in 1959 donated it to Sleepy Hollow Restorations. In all, he invested more than $12 million in the acquisition and restoration of the three properties that were the core of the organization's holdings. In 1986, Sleepy Hollow Restorations became Historic Hudson Valley, which also operates the current guided tours of the Rockefeller family estate of Kykuit in Pocantico Hills.

He is the author of the noted life principle, among others, inscribed on a tablet facing his famed Rockefeller Center: "I believe that every right implies a responsibility; every opportunity, an obligation; every possession, a duty".

In 1935, Rockefeller received The Hundred Year Association of New York's Gold Medal Award, "in recognition of outstanding contributions to the City of New York." He was awarded the Public Welfare Medal from the National Academy of Sciences in 1943.

== Family ==
In August 1900, Rockefeller was invited by the powerful senator Nelson Wilmarth Aldrich of Rhode Island to join a party aboard President William McKinley's yacht, the USS Dolphin, on a cruise to Cuba. Although the outing was of a political nature, Rockefeller's future wife, philanthropist and socialite Abigail Greene "Abby" Aldrich, was included in the large party. The two had first met in the fall of 1894 and had been courting for over four years.

Rockefeller married Abby on October 9, 1901, in what was seen at the time as the consummate marriage of capitalism and politics. She was a daughter of Senator Aldrich and Abigail Pearce Truman "Abby" Chapman. Moreover, their wedding was the major social event of its time – one of the most lavish of the Gilded Age. It was held at the Aldrich Mansion at Warwick Neck, Rhode Island, and attended by executives of Standard Oil and other companies.

The couple had six children: Abby in 1903, John III in 1906, Nelson in 1908, Laurance in 1910, Winthrop in 1912, and David in 1915.

Abby died of a heart attack at the family apartment at 740 Park Avenue in April 1948. Junior remarried in 1951, to Martha Baird, the widow of his old college classmate Arthur Allen.

His sons, the five Rockefeller brothers, established an extensive network of social connections and institutional power over time, based on the foundations that Junior – and before him Senior – had laid down. David became a prominent banker, philanthropist and world statesman. Abby and John III became philanthropists. Laurance became a venture capitalist and conservationist. Nelson and Winthrop Rockefeller later became state governors; Nelson went on to serve as Vice President of the United States under President Gerald Ford.

== Death ==
Rockefeller died of pneumonia on May 11, 1960, at the age of 86 in Tucson, Arizona, during one of his frequent visits there, where he stayed at the Arizona Inn. He was interred in the private Rockefeller cemetery at the family estate in Pocantico Hills, New York, with numerous family members present.

== Personal life ==
He became a member of the Park Avenue Baptist Church in New York City (American Baptist Churches USA), where he financed the construction of a new building in 1926.

== Residences ==
From 1901 to 1913, Junior lived at 13 West 54th Street in New York. Afterward, Junior's principal residence in New York was the 9-story mansion at 10 West 54th Street, but he owned a group of properties in this vicinity, including Nos. 4, 12, 14 and 16 (some of these properties had been previously acquired by his father, John D. Rockefeller). After he vacated No. 10 in 1936, these properties were razed and subsequently all the land was gifted to his wife's Museum of Modern Art. In that year he moved into a luxurious 40-room triplex apartment at 740 Park Avenue. In 1953, the real estate developer William Zeckendorf bought the 740 Park Avenue apartment complex and then sold it to Rockefeller, who quickly turned the building into a cooperative, selling it on to his rich neighbors in the building.

Years later, just after his son Nelson become Governor of New York, Rockefeller helped foil a bid by greenmailer Saul Steinberg to take over Chemical Bank. Steinberg bought Junior's apartment for $225,000, $25,000 less than it had cost new in 1929. It has since been called the greatest trophy apartment in New York, in the world's richest apartment building.

== Honors and legacy ==
In 1929, Junior was elected an honorary member of the Georgia Society of the Cincinnati. In 1935, he received The Hundred Year Association of New York's Gold Medal Award "in recognition of outstanding contributions to the City of New York." In 1939, he was elected Fellow of the Royal Society under statute 12.

The John D. Rockefeller Jr. Library at Brown University, completed in 1964, is named in his honor.

== See also ==
- Forest Hill, Ohio
- Rockefeller Brothers Fund
- Rockefeller family
- List of richest Americans in history

== Citations ==
Non-profit organization positions
| New title | President of the Rockefeller Foundation; February 11, 1913 – November 6, 1917 | Succeeded by George E. Vincent |
| New title | Chairman of the Rockefeller Foundation; 1917–1939 | Succeeded by Walter W. Stewart |
Awards and achievements
| Preceded by Prince Albert, Duke of York | Cover of Time magazine January 19, 1925 | Succeeded by Charles B. Warren |
