= Hanover Township Public Schools =

School district in New Jersey, United States

Address
- 61 Highland Avenue Hanover Township, Morris County, New Jersey, 07981; United States
- Coordinates: 40.825539°N 74.411885°W

District information
- Grades: PreK-8
- Superintendent: Justin Toomey
- Business administrator: Marci Krasny
- Schools: 4

Students and staff
- Enrollment: 1,240 (as of 2024–25)
- Faculty: 126.5 FTEs
- Student–teacher ratio: 9.8:1

Other information
- District Factor Group: I
- Website: www.hanovertwpschools.com
Ind.	Per pupil	District spending	Rank (*)	K-8 average	%± vs. average
1A	Total Spending	$17,594	48	$18,891	−6.9%
1	Budgetary Cost	15,704	75	14,159	10.9%
2	Classroom Instruction	9,037	61	8,659	4.4%
6	Support Services	2,656	75	2,167	22.6%
8	Administrative Cost	1,759	69	1,547	13.7%
10	Operations & Maintenance	2,004	77	1,612	24.3%
13	Extracurricular Activities	120	66	104	15.4%
16	Median Teacher Salary	65,418	67	61,136
Data from NJDoE 2014 Taxpayers' Guide to Education Spending. *Of K-8 districts with more than 750 students. Lowest spending=1; Highest=84

The Hanover Township Public Schools is a comprehensive community public school district that serves students in pre-kindergarten through eighth grade from Hanover Township (including its Cedar Knolls and Whippany neighborhoods), in Morris County, in the U.S. state of New Jersey.

As of the 2024–25 school year, the district, comprised of four schools, had an enrollment of 1,240 students and 126.5 classroom teachers (on an FTE basis), for a student–teacher ratio of 9.8:1.

The district had been classified by the New Jersey Department of Education as being in District Factor Group "I", the second-highest of eight groupings. District Factor Groups organize districts statewide to allow comparison by common socioeconomic characteristics of the local districts. From lowest socioeconomic status to highest, the categories are A, B, CD, DE, FG, GH, I and J.

Students in public school for ninth through twelfth grades attend Whippany Park High School in the Whippany section of Hanover Township, as part of the Hanover Park Regional High School District, which also serves students from the neighboring communities of East Hanover Township and Florham Park, who attend Hanover Park High School in East Hanover. As of the 2024–25 school year, the high school had an enrollment of 584 students and 60.9 classroom teachers (on an FTE basis), for a student–teacher ratio of 9.6:1.

== Policies ==
In May 2023, the district adopted a policy requiring teachers to notify parents regarding the gender identity and sexual orientation of LGBTQIA+ students. The New Jersey Attorney General immediately filed a civil rights complaint about the policy, which also requires teachers to notify parents about "preoccupation with anti-social music" and "transitioning".

== Awards and recognition ==
During the 1998-99 school year, Bee Meadow Elementary School was awarded the Blue Ribbon School Award of Excellence by the United States Department of Education, the highest award an American school can receive.

== Schools ==
Schools in the district (with 2024–25 enrollment data from the National Center for Education Statistics) are:

Elementary schools

- Bee Meadow School with 294 students in grades PreK-5
  - Darrin Stark, principal
- Mountview Road School with 276 students in grades K-5
  - Carmen Camean, principal
- Salem Drive School with 245 students in grades K-5
  - Roberto Camean, principal

Middle school

- Memorial Junior School with 419 students in grades 6-8
  - Michael Anderson, principal

== Administration ==
Core members of the district's administration are:

- Justin Toomey, superintendent
- Marci Krasny, business administrator and board secretary

== Board of education ==
The district's board of education, composed of nine members, sets policy and oversees the fiscal and educational operation of the district through its administration. As a Type II school district, the board's trustees are elected directly by voters to serve three-year terms of office on a staggered basis, with three seats up for election each year held (since 2013) as part of the November general election. The board appoints a superintendent to oversee the district's day-to-day operations and a business administrator to supervise the business functions of the district.
