= Harry Fanok =

American baseball player (born 1940)

- Pitcher
- Born: May 11, 1940 (age 85); Whippany, New Jersey, U.S.
- Batted: Switch Threw: Right

MLB debut
- April 16, 1963, for the St. Louis Cardinals

Last MLB appearance
- May 3, 1964, for the St. Louis Cardinals

MLB statistics
- Win–loss record: 2–1
- Earned run average: 5.40
- Innings: 33 1/3
- Stats at Baseball Reference

Teams
- St. Louis Cardinals (1963–1964)

Harry Michael Fanok Jr. (born May 11, 1940) is an American former professional baseball player, a right-handed pitcher who was nicknamed "the Flame Thrower" for his blazing fastball. Fanok made 16 appearances, all in relief, for the 1963–64 St. Louis Cardinals of Major League Baseball, but he sustained a career-shortening injury to his throwing arm in August 1963 while pitching for the Triple-A Atlanta Crackers. He was born in the Whippany section of Hanover Township, New Jersey to a Ukrainian-American family.

The 6 ft (1.8 m), 180 lb (82 kg) Fanok signed with St. Louis in 1959 after attending what is now the Morristown-Beard School and Hanover Park High School, where he was a baseball standout. After four seasons in minor league baseball, originally as a third baseman before converting to pitching, he began the 1963 season as a member of the MLB Cardinals' pitching staff. He stayed with them for almost two months and 12 games played, fashioning a 2–1 record and recording one save, with 25 strikeouts in 25 2/3 innings pitched.

But Fanok allowed 21 bases on balls and 24 hits, and was told to change his customary three-quarters throwing motion to a straight overhand delivery by Cardinal manager Johnny Keane. Sent back to Triple-A Atlanta to find his rhythm, Fanok pitched well — striking out 146 batters in 127 innings — and was overpowering in an exhibition game against the New York Yankees. A week later, he suffered his sudden shoulder injury.

Fanok would make only four more appearances in the majors, for the 1964 Cardinals. All told, he struck out 35 batters in 33 1/3 major league innings, allowing 29 hits and 24 walks.

In trying to come back from his injury, Fanok developed a mental block. He had always been wild, but his control completely deserted him. He retired from baseball after the 1967 campaign.

He returned to New Jersey after his playing days but eventually settled in Chardon, Ohio.
