= Hanover Township, New Jersey =

Township in Morris County, New Jersey, US

- Township
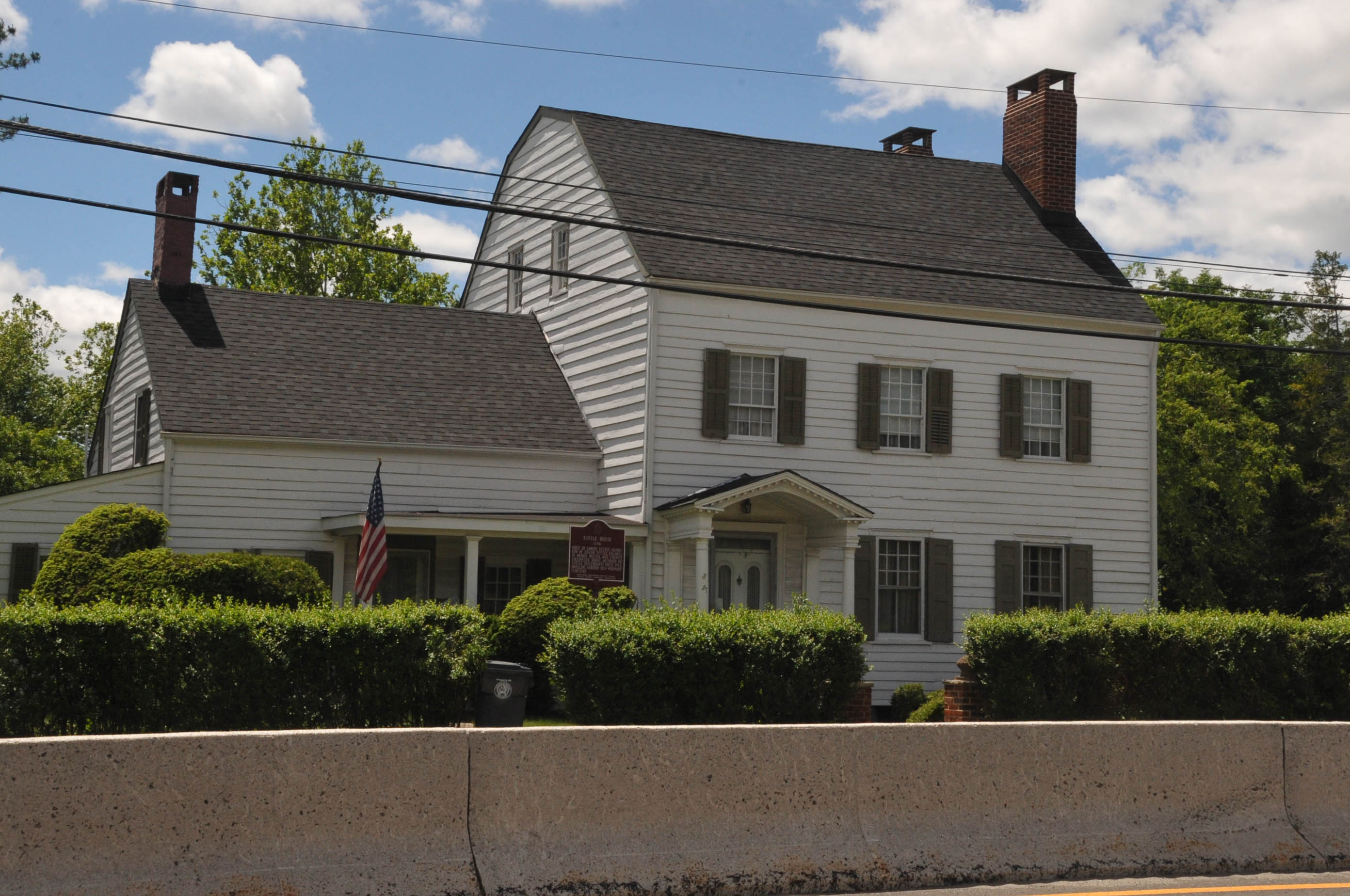
- Tuttle House

- Seal

- Location of Hanover Township in Morris County highlighted in red (right). Inset map: Location of Morris County in New Jersey highlighted in orange (left).

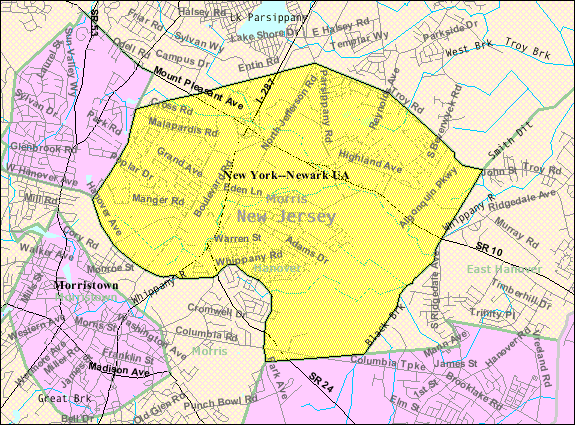
- Census Bureau map of Hanover Township, New Jersey

- Location in Morris County Location in New Jersey Location in the United States
- Coordinates: 40.81995°N 74.427986°W
- Country: United States
- State: New Jersey
- County: Morris
- European settlement: 1676
- Formed: December 7, 1720
- Incorporated: March 25, 1740
- Named for: House of Hanover

Government
  - Type: Township
  - Body: Township Committee
  - Mayor: Thomas "Ace" Gallagher (R, term ends December 31, 2027)
  - Administrator / Municipal clerk: Joseph A. Giorgio

Area
  - Total: 10.75 sq mi (27.83 km^{2})
  - Land: 10.51 sq mi (27.23 km^{2})
  - Water: 0.23 sq mi (0.59 km^{2}) 2.14%
  - Rank: 204th of 565 in state 16th of 39 in county
- Elevation: 279 ft (85 m)

Population (2020)
  - Total: 14,677
  - Estimate (2024): 15,093
  - Rank: 180th of 565 in state 15th of 39 in county
  - Density: 1,396.1/sq mi (539.0/km^{2})
  - Rank: 346th of 565 in state 22nd of 39 in county
- Time zone: UTC−05:00 (Eastern (EST))
  - Summer (DST): UTC−04:00 (Eastern (EDT))
- ZIP Codes: 07927 – Cedar Knolls; 07981 – Whippany
- Area codes: 862/973
- FIPS code: 3402729550
- GNIS feature ID: 0882187
- Website: www.hanovertownship.com

Hanover Township is a township in Morris County, in the U.S. state of New Jersey. As of the 2020 United States census, the township's population was 14,677, its highest decennial count ever and an increase of 965 (+7.0%) from the 13,712 recorded at the 2010 census, which in turn reflected an increase of 814 (+6.3%) from the 12,898 counted in the 2000 census. The township comprises the unincorporated communities of Whippany and Cedar Knolls.

Located just north of the historic town of Morristown (separated by a thin strip of Morris Township) and adjacent to the regional Morristown Municipal Airport, Hanover Township offers many public attractions including the Whippany Railway Museum, the Frelinghuysen Arboretum and the Morris County Library. Patriots' Path, a wilderness walkway and bike trail that stretches for 26 miles (42 km), also passes through the township along the Whippany River.

== History ==
Hanover Township is the site of the first European settlement in northwest New Jersey. New Englanders established a settlement along the Whippany River in 1685 near the current location of the old Whippany Cemetery on Route 10.

Once the Province of West Jersey purchased the land from the local Lenape Native Americans, the original County of Morris was created and comprised all of what is now Morris, Sussex and Warren Counties. The counties were partitioned into townships. Morris' original township was 'Whippenny' which itself comprised all of what is now Morris County.

The name "Hanover" was taken from the House of Hanover in Germany. This namesake was given to the Township of Hanover on December 7, 1720, as a sign of respect to George I of Great Britain who was of the House of Hanover and who ruled over the American colonies in the eighteenth century. Its size has been considerably decreased as the population of the area has increased since the creation of Hanover Township in 1720 and its incorporation on March 25, 1740, with the formation of Morris County. Originally encompassing all of Morris County and parts of Sussex and Warren County, Hanover Township became too unwieldy for a single local government to maintain. The Township was subdivided into smaller municipalities that could provide more responsive local control despite placing greater demands on the local tax base to support new facilities for each.

Portions of the township were taken to form Mendham Township on March 29, 1749. Hanover Township was established by the Township Act of 1798 of the New Jersey Legislature on February 21, 1798. Additional portions of the township were taken to form Chatham Township (February 12, 1806), Rockaway Township (April 8, 1844), Boonton Town (March 16, 1866), Mountain Lakes (April 29, 1924), Morris Plains (April 15, 1926), East Hanover Township and Parsippany-Troy Hills Township (which both split off on May 9, 1928).

During the Revolutionary War, George Washington and his troops often camped in, and marched through, Hanover Township.

The name Whippany is adapted from the Native American word Whippanong which means “place of the arrow wood".

The old settlements of Monroe and Malapardis were consumed by development and what remains are two communities—Whippany and Cedar Knolls—which are roughly separated by Interstate 287.

The Malapardis area of Cedar Knolls is primarily located around Malapardis Road. A section of Malapardis, even though it is in Hanover Township's borders, has a Morris Plains mailing zip code. Another section of Cedar Knolls is called Trailwood which has a section of its land in a Morris Plains ZIP code, the area closest to American Way.

The Monroe area of Whippany is located around Whippany Road and Cedar Knolls Road, marked by a building in the intersection named Monroe Hall.

Until the post-World War II suburbanization of New Jersey, Hanover Township was a sparsely populated industrial town known for its iron works and paper mills. This industry was driven by the ever-present power of the Whippany River. Over the second half of the twentieth century, the Township became thoroughly suburban.

Lucent Technologies had a large facility in Whippany. The first demonstration of long distance television transmission in the United States took place in 1927, with a transmission that went via wire from Washington, D.C., to New York, and from Whippany to New York using radio.

The Seeing Eye, the first guide dog school for the blind in the United States, was located in Whippany between 1931 and 1966, before moving to its current campus in nearby Morris Township.

In 2026, Hanover Township commemorated the 350th anniversary of Whippany, tracing the community's recorded history to a 1676 deed that referred to the area as "a Place Called Whippano."

== Geography ==
According to the United States Census Bureau, the township had a total area of 10.75 square miles (27.83 km^{2}), including 10.52 square miles (27.23 km^{2}) of land and 0.23 square miles (0.59 km^{2}) of water (2.14%).

Unincorporated communities, localities and place names located partially or completely within the township include Balls Mills, Black Meadows, Cedar Knolls, Eden Mill, Horse Hill, Jefferson, Lee Meadows, Malapardis, Monroe and Whippany.

Hanover Township borders the Morris County municipalities of East Hanover Township, Florham Park, Morris Plains, Morris Township and Parsippany-Troy Hills Township.

As of 2026, the township is a member of Local Leaders for Responsible Planning in order to address the township's Mount Laurel doctrine-based housing obligations.

== Demographics ==
Historical population
Census	Pop.	Note	%±
1810	3,843	*	—
1820	3,503		−8.8%
1830	3,718		6.1%
1840	3,909		5.1%
1850	3,614	*	−7.5%
1860	3,476		−3.8%
1870	3,623	*	4.2%
1880	4,138		14.2%
1890	4,481		8.3%
1900	5,366		19.8%
1910	6,228		16.1%
1920	8,531		37.0%
1930	2,516	*	−70.5%
1940	2,812		11.8%
1950	3,756		33.6%
1960	9,329		148.4%
1970	10,700		14.7%
1980	11,846		10.7%
1990	11,538		−2.6%
2000	12,898		11.8%
2010	13,712		6.3%
2020	14,677		7.0%
2024 (est.)	15,093		2.8%
Population sources: 1810–1920 1840 1850–1870; 1850 1870 1880–1890; 1890–1910 1910–1930; 1940–2000 2000; 2010 2020 * = Lost territory in previous decade.

=== 2010 census ===
The 2010 United States census counted 13,712 people, 5,308 households, and 3,790 families in the township. The population density was 1,302.8 per square mile (503.0/km^{2}). There were 5,526 housing units at an average density of 525.0 per square mile (202.7/km^{2}). The racial makeup was 85.53% (11,728) White, 1.01% (138) Black or African American, 0.04% (6) Native American, 10.80% (1,481) Asian, 0.01% (1) Pacific Islander, 1.26% (173) from other races, and 1.35% (185) from two or more races. Hispanic or Latino of any race were 4.59% (630) of the population.

Of the 5,308 households, 30.9% had children under the age of 18; 61.1% were married couples living together; 8.0% had a female householder with no husband present and 28.6% were non-families. Of all households, 25.1% were made up of individuals and 12.9% had someone living alone who was 65 years of age or older. The average household size was 2.58 and the average family size was 3.12.

22.2% of the population were under the age of 18, 5.5% from 18 to 24, 24.2% from 25 to 44, 30.0% from 45 to 64, and 18.1% who were 65 years of age or older. The median age was 43.9 years. For every 100 females, the population had 91.8 males. For every 100 females ages 18 and older there were 88.1 males.

The Census Bureau's 2006–2010 American Community Survey showed that (in 2010 inflation-adjusted dollars) median household income was $100,962 (with a margin of error of +/− $6,654) and the median family income was $115,341 (+/− $10,572). Males had a median income of $76,766 (+/− $2,263) versus $61,441 (+/− $5,321) for females. The per capita income for the borough was $44,123 (+/− $2,675). About 1.5% of families and 2.2% of the population were below the poverty line, including 1.5% of those under age 18 and 1.9% of those age 65 or over.

=== 2000 census ===
At the 2000 United States census there were 12,898 people, 4,745 households and 3,620 families residing in the township. The population density was 1,209.6 inhabitants per square mile (467.0/km^{2}). There were 4,818 housing units at an average density of 451.8 per square mile (174.4/km^{2}). The racial makeup of the township was 88.79% White, 1.09% African American, 0.05% Native American, 8.71% Asian, 0.01% Pacific Islander, 0.59% from other races, and 0.77% from two or more races. Hispanic or Latino of any race were 3.50% of the population.

There were 4,745 households, of which 32.8% had children under the age of 18 living with them, 65.8% were married couples living together, 8.0% had a female householder with no husband present, and 23.7% were non-families. 19.6% of all households were made up of individuals, and 7.7% had someone living alone who was 65 years of age or older. The average household size was 2.71 and the average family size was 3.13.

Age distribution was 22.8% under the age of 18, 5.6% from 18 to 24, 30.1% from 25 to 44, 26.6% from 45 to 64, and 14.9% who were 65 years of age or older. The median age was 40 years. For every 100 females, there were 94.7 males. For every 100 females age 18 and over, there were 91.1 males.

The median household income was $84,115, and the median family income was $93,937. Males had a median income of $59,278 versus $40,799 for females. The per capita income for the township was $37,661. About 0.7% of families and 1.2% of the population were below the poverty line, including 1.0% of those under age 18 and 1.4% of those age 65 or over.

== Arts and culture ==
The township is home to the Whippany-based Hanover Wind Symphony, which was established in 1985.

== Sports ==
Home of the 2017 Junior Pee Wee Division Youth Football National Champions sponsored by the NFL Hall of Fame.

The New York Red Bulls U23, a development team for the New York Red Bulls, play at the team's 15-acre (6.1 ha) development facility in the township.

== Parks and recreation ==
Municipal parks and recreational facilities include:

- Bee Meadow Park / Brickyard Field
- Bee Meadow Pool
- Blackbrook Park
- Central Park
- Malapardis Park
- Monroe Hall and Park
- Township Community Center
- New York Red Bulls training facility

== Government ==
=== Local government ===
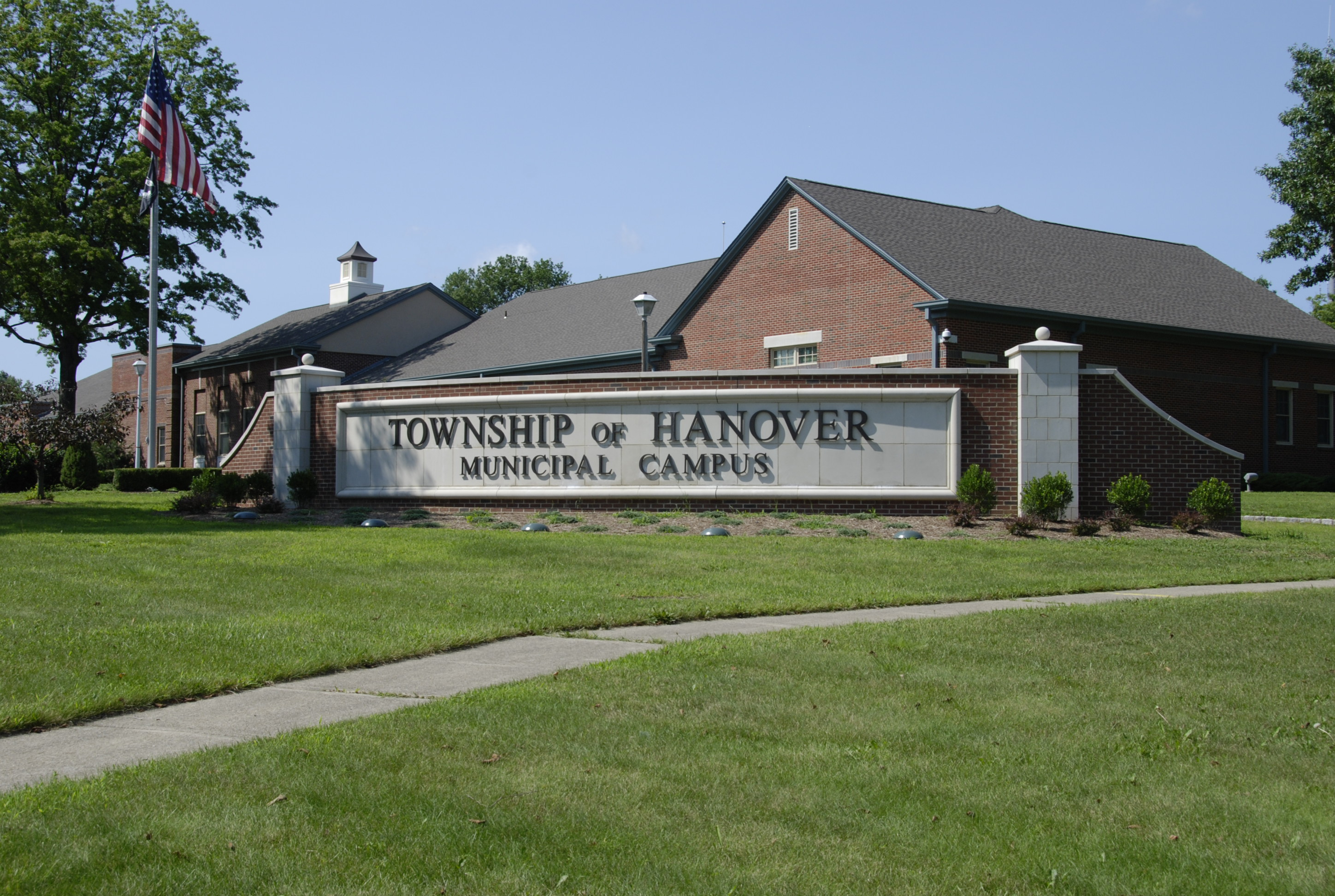
Hanover Township Hall at Jefferson Road and Route 10 in August 2007

Hanover Township is governed under the Township form of New Jersey municipal government, one of 141 municipalities (of the 564) statewide that use this form, the second-most commonly used form of government in the state. The Township Committee is comprised of five members, who are elected directly by the voters at-large in partisan elections to serve three-year terms of office on a staggered basis, with either one or two seats coming up for election each year as part of the November general election in a three-year cycle. A mayor and deputy mayor are selected at the annual reorganization meeting by the committeemen from among the members of the Township Committee.

As of 2023, members of the Township Committee are Mayor Thomas A. "Ace" Gallagher (R, term on committee ends December 31, 2025; term as mayor ends 2023), Deputy Mayor Michael A. Mihalko (R, term on committee and as deputy mayor ends 2023), Brian J. Cahill (R, 2023), John L. Ferramosca (R, 2024) and Ronald F. Francioli (R, 2025).

In July 2020, Ronald F. Francioli stepped down as mayor, while retaining his committee seat. John L. Ferramosca moved from deputy mayor and took over as mayor while Thomas A. "Ace" Gallagher was chosen as deputy mayor.

Township Hall, which was renovated and enlarged in 2003, is located at the corner of Jefferson Road and Route 10. It contains all Township offices, the Township Municipal Court, the Police Department and the Whippanong Public Library.

The 2014 township budget was $24,927,191.79, with a combined property tax rate in Cedar Knolls of $1.705 per $100 in assessed value and $1.670 for Whippany, reflecting differences in fire district assessments. The Township's NJ Treasury/Taxation code is 1412.

=== Township services ===
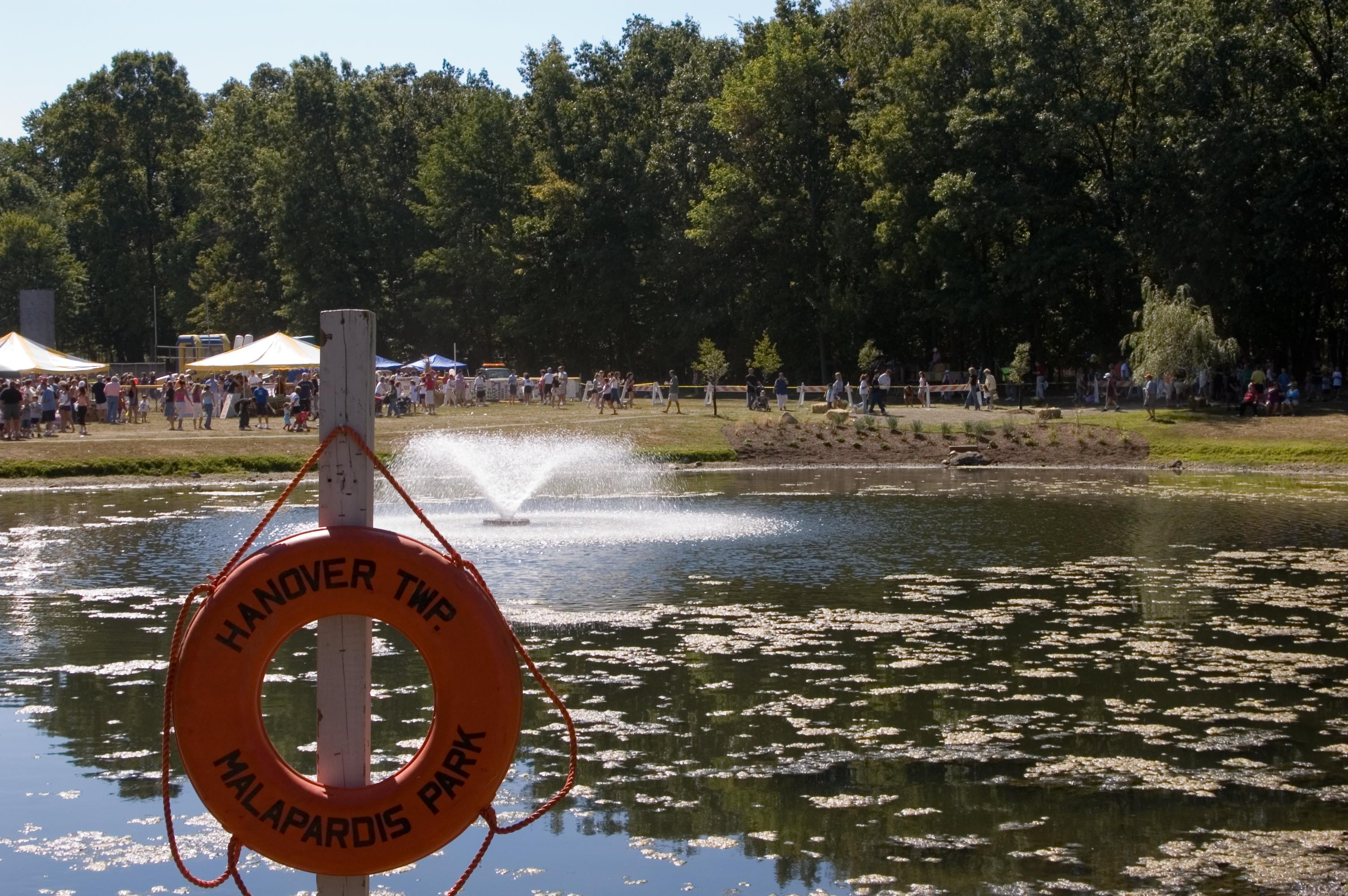
Malapardis Park in the Cedar Knolls section of Hanover Township

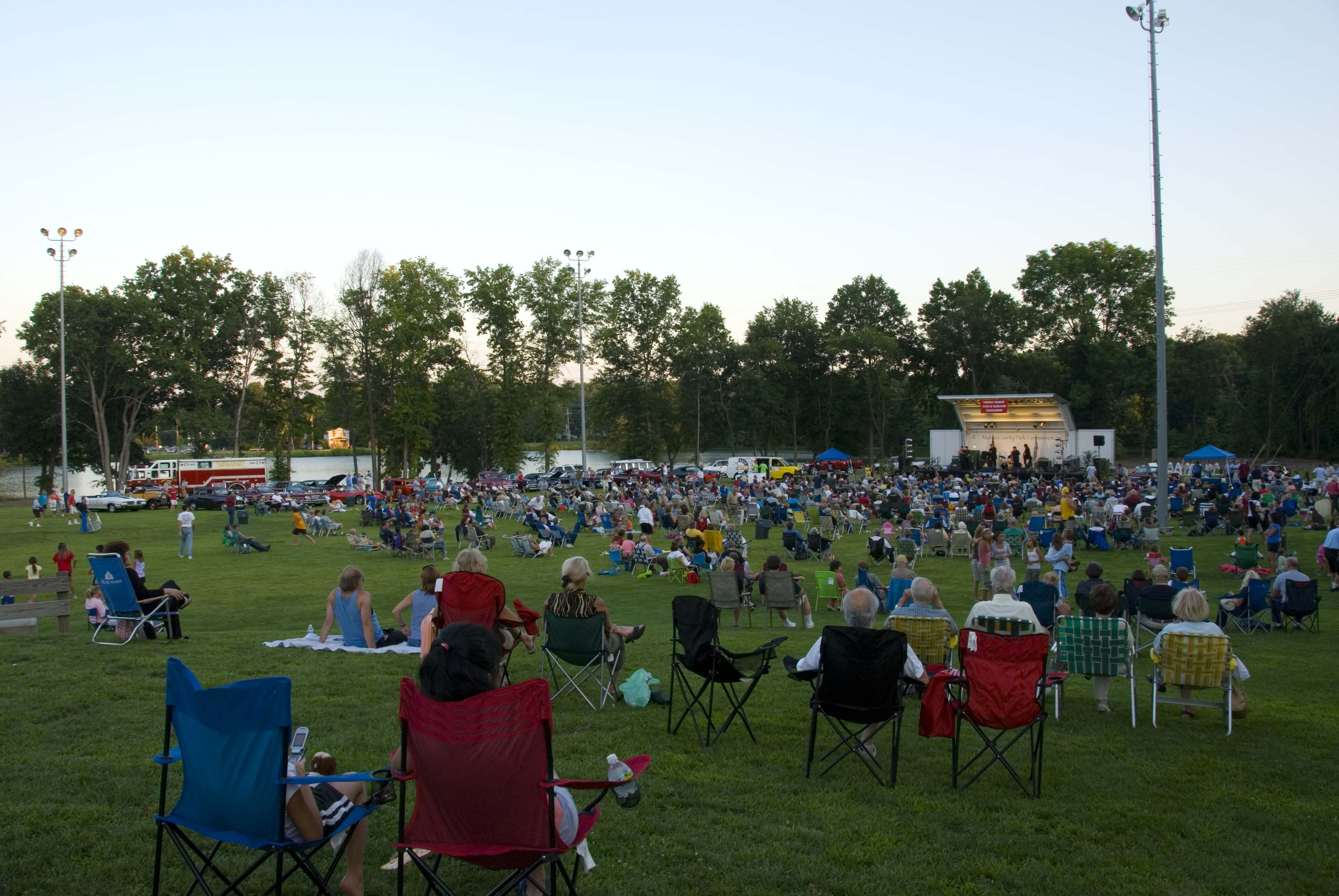
Bee Meadow Park in the Whippany section of Hanover Township during the Summer Concert Series

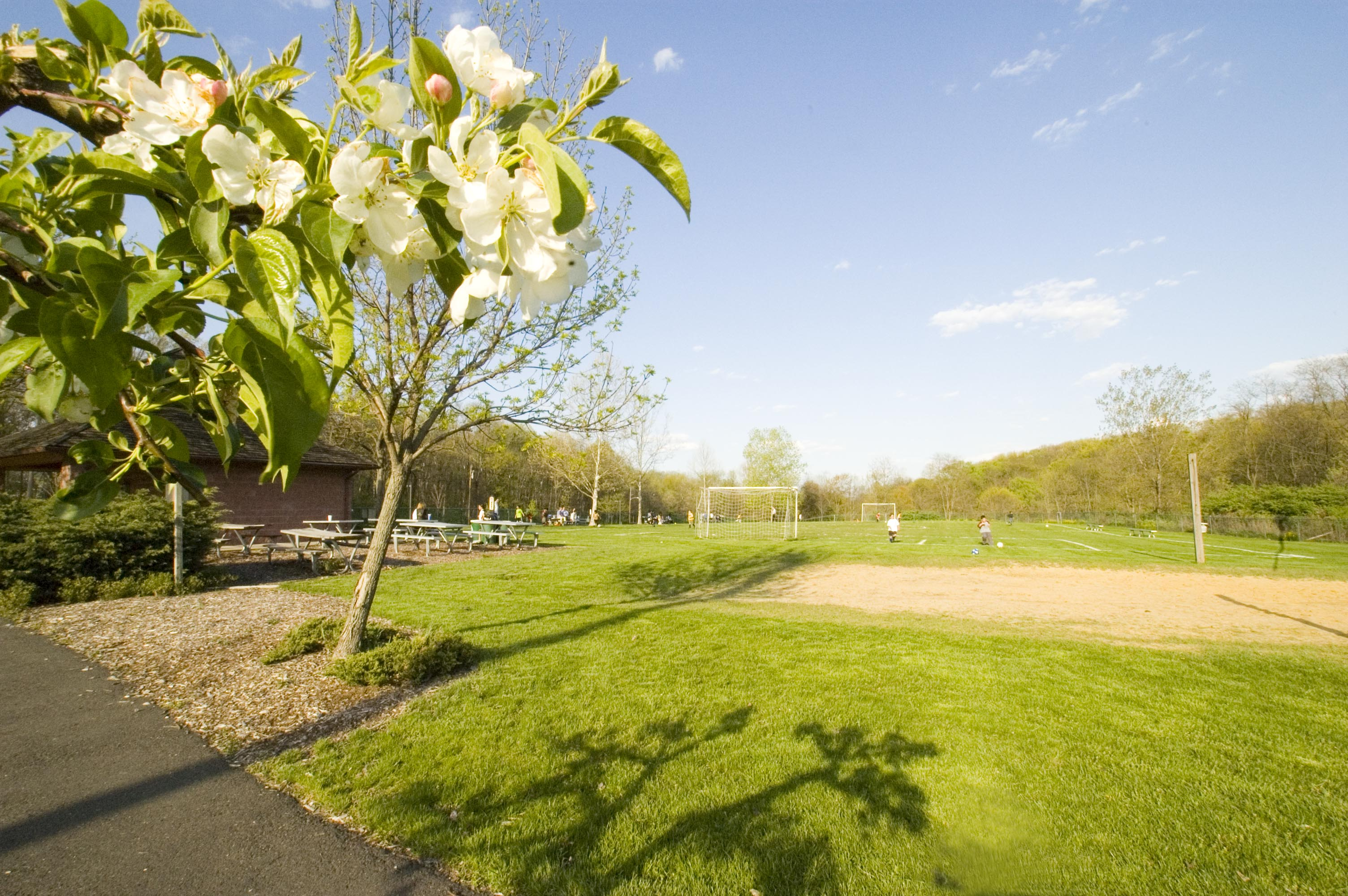
Central Park in the Whippany section of Hanover Township

The Township has its own Police Department consisting of about 30 officers in addition to a Public Works Department which handles the Township's sanitation and recycling needs. The Cedar Knolls First Aid Squad provides emergency medical coverage for the entire township. Morristown Medical Center, a level-2 regional trauma center, is about three miles away.

There are two combination volunteer/career fire districts in the Township:

- Whippany Fire District #2 is located on the corner of Troy Hills Road and Route 10. They maintain two engines, aerial ladder, swift water rescue team vehicle and a hazardous materials response (hazmat) team truck.
- Cedar Knolls Fire District #3 is located at the corner of Ridgedale and Mountain Avenues. They maintain two engines, and the Township's emergency medical services (EMS) ambulance.

The Hanover Sewerage Authority provides sewerage service for the Township. It has a treatment plant located on Troy Road.

=== Federal, state and county representation ===
Hanover Township is located in the 11th Congressional District and is part of New Jersey's 26th state legislative district.

For the 119th United States Congress, New Jersey's 11th congressional district is represented by Analilia Mejia (D, Glen Ridge) who was elected in a 2026 special election to serve for the remainder of the Congress following the resignation Mikie Sherrill (D, Montclair), who was elected Governor of New Jersey in 2025. New Jersey is represented in the United States Senate by Democrats Cory Booker (Newark, term ends 2027) and Andy Kim (Moorestown, term ends 2031).

For the 2026–2027 session, the 26th legislative district of the New Jersey Legislature is represented in the State Senate by Joseph Pennacchio (R, Rockaway Township) and in the General Assembly by Brian Bergen (R, Denville Township) and Jay Webber (R, Morris Plains).

Morris County is governed by a Board of County Commissioners comprised of seven members who are elected at-large in partisan elections to three-year terms on a staggered basis, with either one or three seats up for election each year as part of the November general election. Actual day-to-day operation of departments is supervised by County Administrator Deena Leary.

As of 2026, Morris County's Commissioners (with all terms ending December 31) are Director Stephen H. Shaw (R, Mountain Lakes, 2027), Deputy Director John Krickus (R, Washington Township, 2027), Douglas Cabana (R, Boonton Township, 2028), Thomas J. Mastrangelo (R, Montville, 2028), Christine Myers (R, Harding Township, 2028), Tayfun Selen (R, Chatham Township, 2026), and Deborah Smith (R, Denville Township, 2027).

The county's constitutional officers are County Clerk Ann F. Grossi (R, Parsippany–Troy Hills, 2028), Sheriff James M. Gannon (R, Boonton Township, 2025) and Surrogate Heather Darling (R, Roxbury, 2029).

=== Politics ===
United States presidential election results for Hanover Township 2024 2020 2016 2012 2008 2004
Year	Republican		Democratic		Third party(ies)	
Year	No.	%	No.	%	No.	%
2024	5,282	57.44%	3,777	41.07%	137	1.49%
2020	5,239	55.19%	4,143	43.64%	111	1.17%
2016	4,627	58.36%	3,071	38.73%	231	2.91%
2012	4,384	60.97%	2,740	38.10%	67	0.93%
2008	4,544	60.46%	2,894	38.50%	78	1.04%
2004	4,474	61.43%	2,740	37.62%	69	0.95%

As of March 2011, there were a total of 9,317 registered voters in Hanover Township, of which 4,356 (46.8%) were registered as Republicans, 1,606 (17.2%) were registered as Democrats, and 3,350 (36.0%) were registered as Unaffiliated. There were 5 voters registered as Libertarians or Greens.

In the 2012 presidential election, Republican Mitt Romney received 61.0% of the vote (4,384 cast), ahead of Democrat Barack Obama with 38.1% (2,740 votes), and other candidates with 0.9% (67 votes), among the 7,243 ballots cast by the township's 9,782 registered voters (52 ballots were spoiled), for a turnout of 74.0%. In the 2008 presidential election, Republican John McCain received 60.2% of the vote (4,544 cast), ahead of Democrat Barack Obama with 38.3% (2,894 votes) and other candidates with 1.0% (78 votes), among the 7,553 ballots cast by the township's 9,478 registered voters, for a turnout of 79.7%. In the 2004 presidential election, Republican George W. Bush received 61.2% of the vote (4,474 ballots cast), outpolling Democrat John Kerry with 37.5% (2,740 votes) and other candidates with 0.7% (69 votes), among the 7,312 ballots cast by the township's 9,226 registered voters, for a turnout percentage of 79.3.

Gubernatorial election results for Hanover Township
Year	Republican		Democratic		Third party(ies)	
Year	No.	%	No.	%	No.	%
2025	4,232	56.01%	3,287	43.50%	37	0.49%
2021	3,806	61.56%	2,363	38.22%	14	0.23%
2017	2,723	59.40%	1,785	38.94%	76	1.66%
2013	3,337	73.29%	1,156	25.39%	60	1.32%
2009	3,314	65.16%	1,388	27.29%	384	7.55%
2005	2,618	59.49%	1,677	38.10%	106	2.41%

In the 2013 gubernatorial election, Republican Chris Christie received 73.3% of the vote (3,337 cast), ahead of Democrat Barbara Buono with 25.4% (1,156 votes), and other candidates with 1.3% (60 votes), among the 4,635 ballots cast by the township's 9,849 registered voters (82 ballots were spoiled), for a turnout of 47.1%. In the 2009 gubernatorial election, Republican Chris Christie received 64.5% of the vote (3,314 ballots cast), ahead of Democrat Jon Corzine with 27.0% (1,388 votes), Independent Chris Daggett with 7.2% (368 votes) and other candidates with 0.3% (16 votes), among the 5,138 ballots cast by the township's 9,358 registered voters, yielding a 54.9% turnout.

United States Senate election results for Hanover Township1
Year	Republican		Democratic		Third party(ies)	
Year	No.	%	No.	%	No.	%
2024	4,889	56.71%	3,606	41.83%	126	1.46%
2018	4,045	60.67%	2,458	36.87%	164	2.46%
2012	3,970	60.31%	2,546	38.68%	67	1.02%
2006	2,790	62.61%	1,598	35.86%	68	1.53%

United States Senate election results for Hanover Township2
Year	Republican		Democratic		Third party(ies)	
Year	No.	%	No.	%	No.	%
2020	5,077	55.98%	3,890	42.89%	103	1.14%
2014	2,139	60.63%	1,340	37.98%	49	1.39%
2013	2,042	64.62%	1,095	34.65%	23	0.73%
2008	4,049	61.24%	2,475	37.43%	88	1.33%

== Education ==
=== Public schools ===
For pre-kindergarten through eighth grade, public school students attend the Hanover Township Public Schools. As of the 2024–25 school year, the district, comprised of four schools, had an enrollment of 1,240 students and 126.5 classroom teachers (on an FTE basis), for a student–teacher ratio of 9.8:1. Schools in the district (with 2024–25 enrollment data from the National Center for Education Statistics) are Bee Meadow School with 294 students in grades PreK-5, Mountview Road School with 276 students in grades K-5, Salem Drive School with 245 students in grades K-5 and Memorial Junior School with 419 students in grades 6-8.

Students in public school for ninth through twelfth grades attend Whippany Park High School in the Whippany section of Hanover Township, as part of the Hanover Park Regional High School District, which also serves students from the neighboring communities of East Hanover Township and Florham Park, who attend Hanover Park High School in East Hanover. As of the 2024–25 school year, the high school had an enrollment of 584 students and 60.9 classroom teachers (on an FTE basis), for a student–teacher ratio of 9.6:1. The seats on the high school district's nine-member board of education are allocated to the constituent municipalities based on population, with Hanover Township assigned three seats.

=== Parochial and private schools ===
There are also three private special education schools: The Allegro School, The Calais School and P.G. Chambers School.

== Transportation ==
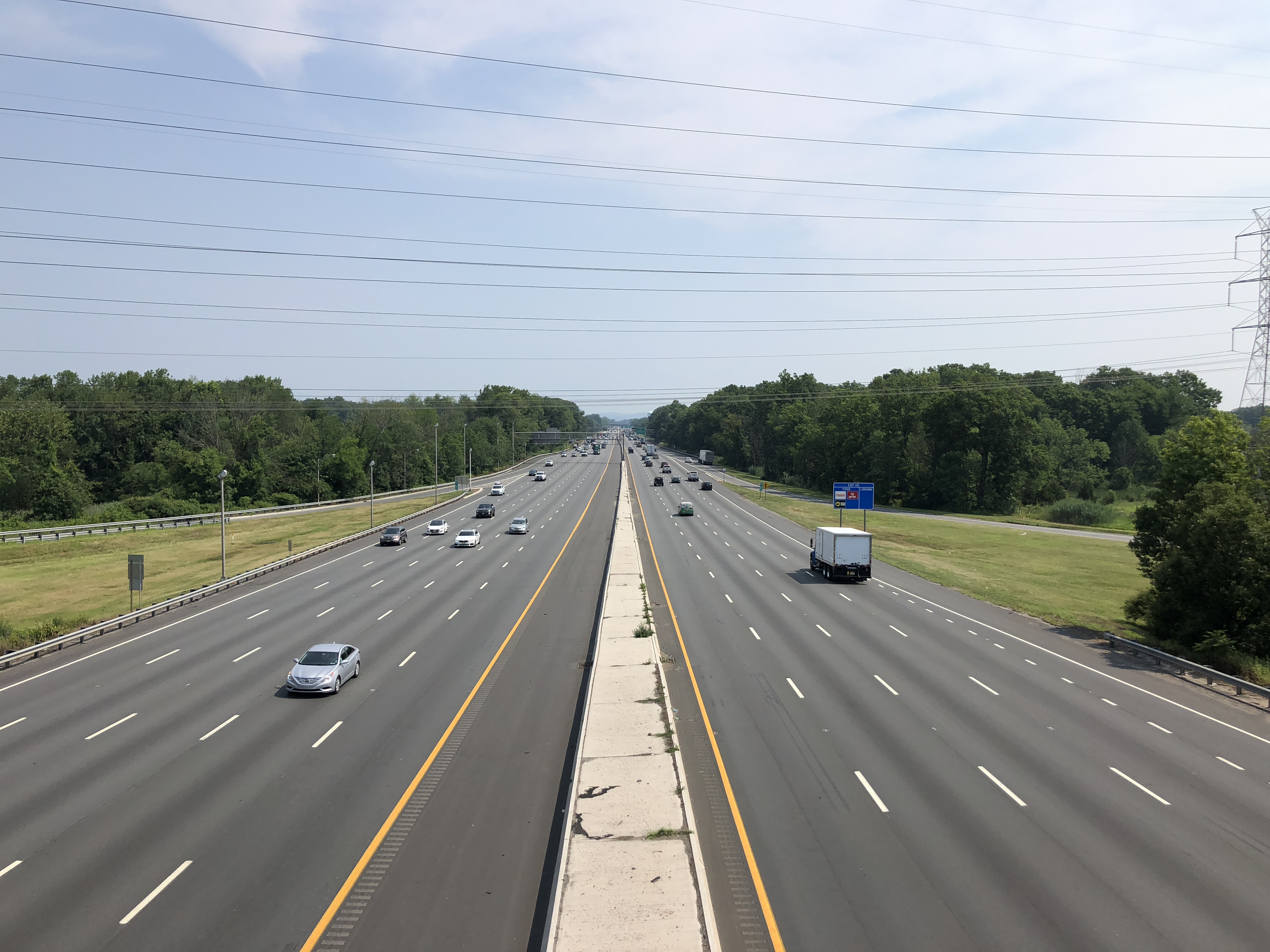
Interstate 287 northbound in Hanover Township

=== Roads and highways ===
As of May 2010, the township had a total of 77.54 miles (124.79 km) of roadways, of which 62.47 miles (100.54 km) were maintained by the municipality, 7.46 miles (12.01 km) by Morris County and 7.61 miles (12.25 km) by the New Jersey Department of Transportation.

Interstate 287, Route 10 and Route 24 pass through the Township. Interstate 80, U.S. Route 46 and U.S. Route 202 are nearby.

=== Public transportation ===
NJ Transit offers local bus service on the 871, 872 and 874 routes, with service between the township and Newark on the 73 route. Until 2010, service in the borough was offered on the MCM8 route, until subsidies offered to the local provider were eliminated by NJ Transit as part of budget cuts.

The Whippany Line of the Morristown and Erie Railway, a small freight line, traverses the township. Established in 1895, the line runs from Morristown and runs through East Hanover Township and Hanover Township to Roseland.

=== Aviation ===
Morristown Municipal Airport is a general aviation facility located within Hanover Township, though it is owned by the town of Morristown.

Newark Liberty International Airport in Newark / Elizabeth is the closest airport with scheduled passenger service. It is approximately 20 minutes away via Route 24 and Interstate 78.

== Media ==
Radio stations WMTR and WDHA have studios and offices located in the Cedar Knolls section of the township.

== Economy ==
Major employers in Hanover Township include:

- In Whippany: Bayer, Suburban Propane, Omnicare, Halo Pharma, Drew Marine, Arthur J. Gallagher & Co.
- In Cedar Knolls: Edgewell Personal Care and ShopRite

== Name confusion ==
There is some confusion over the place names in Hanover Township which results from the sometimes arcane usage of place names in New Jersey.

Whippany and Cedar Knolls are place names for unincorporated communities. They each have their own ZIP Code and fire department but are otherwise simply neighborhood names. The two each had their own post office until 2011, when flooding from Hurricane Irene destroyed the Whippany post office.

Next to Hanover Township is East Hanover Township which has a neighborhood called 'Hanover'. Also, there is a New Hanover Township and a North Hanover Township in Burlington County, and several other Hanover Townships in Pennsylvania and Michigan. Furthermore, street signs and maps often do not identify Hanover Township but instead indicate one of the place names.

Residents of Whippany and Cedar Knolls have become accustomed to indicating that they live in either Whippany or Cedar Knolls and not in Hanover Township. Some confusion comes from the difference between neighborhood boundaries, and the arbitrary ZIP Code boundaries that do not necessarily coincide with municipal boundaries resulting in township mailing addresses which use place names outside of the township. Whippany's ZIP code is 07981 and Cedar Knolls' is 07927.

== Notable events ==
On January 5, 2009, five unidentified red lights were spotted in the night sky over Hanover Township and Morris County. The event became nationally known as the Morristown UFO hoax after two residents disclosed how they had used road flares attached to balloons to create the objects seen across the area.

== Notable people ==
People who were born in, residents of, or otherwise closely associated with Hanover Township include:

- Arthur R. Albohn (1921–2008), member of the New Jersey General Assembly from 1980 to 1996
- George Hammell Cook (1818–1889), State Geologist of New Jersey and namesake of Cook College at Rutgers University
- Damon Daunno (born 1984), actor who starred in the 2019 Broadway revival of Oklahoma!
- Rosemarie DeWitt (born 1974), actress
- Mahlon Dickerson (1770–1853), Governor of New Jersey and U.S. Senator who also served as United States Secretary of the Navy
- Smith Ely Jr. (1825–1911), member of the United States House of Representatives from New York and Mayor of New York City
- Harry Fanok (born 1940), former MLB pitcher who played for the St. Louis Cardinals
- Dan Frischman (born 1959), character actor, noted for his many roles of playing socially inept "geeks" and "nerds"
- Ashbel Green (1762–1848), Chaplain of the United States House of Representatives from 1792 to 1800 and President of Princeton University from 1812 to 1822
- Aaron Kitchell (1744–1820), politician who represented New Jersey in both the United States House of Representatives and the United States Senate
- Othniel Looker (1757–1845), fifth governor of Ohio
- Thomas Millidge (c. 1735–1816), loyalist during the American Revolutionary War who later became a wealthy landowner in Canada
- William W. Phelps (1792–1892), best known for his legacy of LDS hymns, many of which appear in the current edition of the LDS Hymnal
- Brian Saxton (born 1972), tight end who played in the NFL for the New York Giants
- Linda Tripp (born 1949-2020), former U.S. civil servant who figured in the Monica Lewinsky scandal involving former U.S. President Bill Clinton.
- Enoch Cobb Wines (1806–1879), minister of the Congregational church and prison reform advocate
