= Hanover Park Regional High School District =

Public school district in Morris County, New Jersey, US

Address
- 75 Mount Pleasant Avenue East Hanover, Morris County, 07936; United States
- Coordinates: 40.80486°N 74.371489°W

District information
- Grades: 9-12
- Superintendent: Maria Carrell
- Business administrator: William F. Albert Jr.
- Schools: 2

Students and staff
- Enrollment: 1,331 (as of 2023–24)
- Faculty: 133.0 FTEs
- Student–teacher ratio: 10.0:1

Other information
- District Factor Group: GH
- Website: www.hpreg.org
Ind.	Per pupil	District spending	Rank (*)	9-12 average	%± vs. average
1A	Total Spending	$22,206	32	$18,891	17.5%
1	Budgetary Cost	15,883	21	15,592	1.9%
2	Classroom Instruction	8,613	19	8,807	−2.2%
6	Support Services	2,348	24	2,294	2.4%
8	Administrative Cost	1,769	34	1,592	11.1%
10	Operations & Maintenance	1,843	19	1,954	−5.7%
13	Extracurricular Activities	1,110	38	873	27.1%
16	Median Teacher Salary	63,525	15	71,726
Data from NJDoE 2014 Taxpayers' Guide to Education Spending. *Of 9-12 districts with any number of students. Lowest spending=1; Highest=47

The Hanover Park Regional High School District is a comprehensive regional public school district that serves students in ninth through twelfth grades from three communities in Morris County, in the U.S. state of New Jersey. Students come from East Hanover Township, Florham Park and Hanover Township.

As of the 2023–24 school year, the district, comprised of two schools, had an enrollment of 1,331 students and 133.0 classroom teachers (on an FTE basis), for a student–teacher ratio of 10.0:1.

The district had been classified by the New Jersey Department of Education as being in District Factor Group "GH", the third-highest of eight groupings. District Factor Groups organize districts statewide to allow comparison by common socioeconomic characteristics of the local districts. From lowest socioeconomic status to highest, the categories are A, B, CD, DE, FG, GH, I and J.

== History ==
Students from East Hanover and Florham Park had been informed in 1952 by the Madison Public Schools that students from the two communities could not be accommodated at Madison High School after the 1954-55 school year.

Hanover Park High School was designed to accommodate 1,000 students when complete and was estimated to cost $2.25 million (equivalent to $26 million in 2024). In 1956, the architect of the Hanover Park facility received an award for its campus-type design, the first such in the state.

== Schools ==
Schools in the district (with 2023–24 enrollment data from the National Center for Education Statistics) are:

- Hanover Park High School, which opened in 1956, serves the Township of East Hanover and the Borough of Florham Park. It had an enrollment of 801 in grades 9 through 12. The school is located in East Hanover Township.
  - Thomas J. Callanan, principal
- Whippany Park High School, whose doors opened in 1967, serves the Township of Hanover. The enrollment was 613 in grades 9 through 12. The school is located in the Whippany section of Hanover Township.
  - Christopher N. Kelly, principal

== Administration ==
Core members of the district's administration are:

- Maria Carrell, superintendent
- William F. Albert Jr., business administrator and board secretary

== Board of education ==
The district's board of education, comprised of nine members, sets policy and oversees the fiscal and educational operation of the district through its administration. As a Type II school district, the board's trustees are elected directly by voters to serve three-year terms of office on a staggered basis, with three seats up for election each year held (since 2012) as part of the November general election. The board appoints a superintendent to oversee the district's day-to-day operations and a business administrator to supervise the business functions of the district. The seats on the board of education are allocated to the constituent municipalities based on their population, with East Hanover Township, Florham Park and Hanover Township each assigned three seats.
