= East Hanover Township, New Jersey =

Township in Morris County, New Jersey, US

- Township
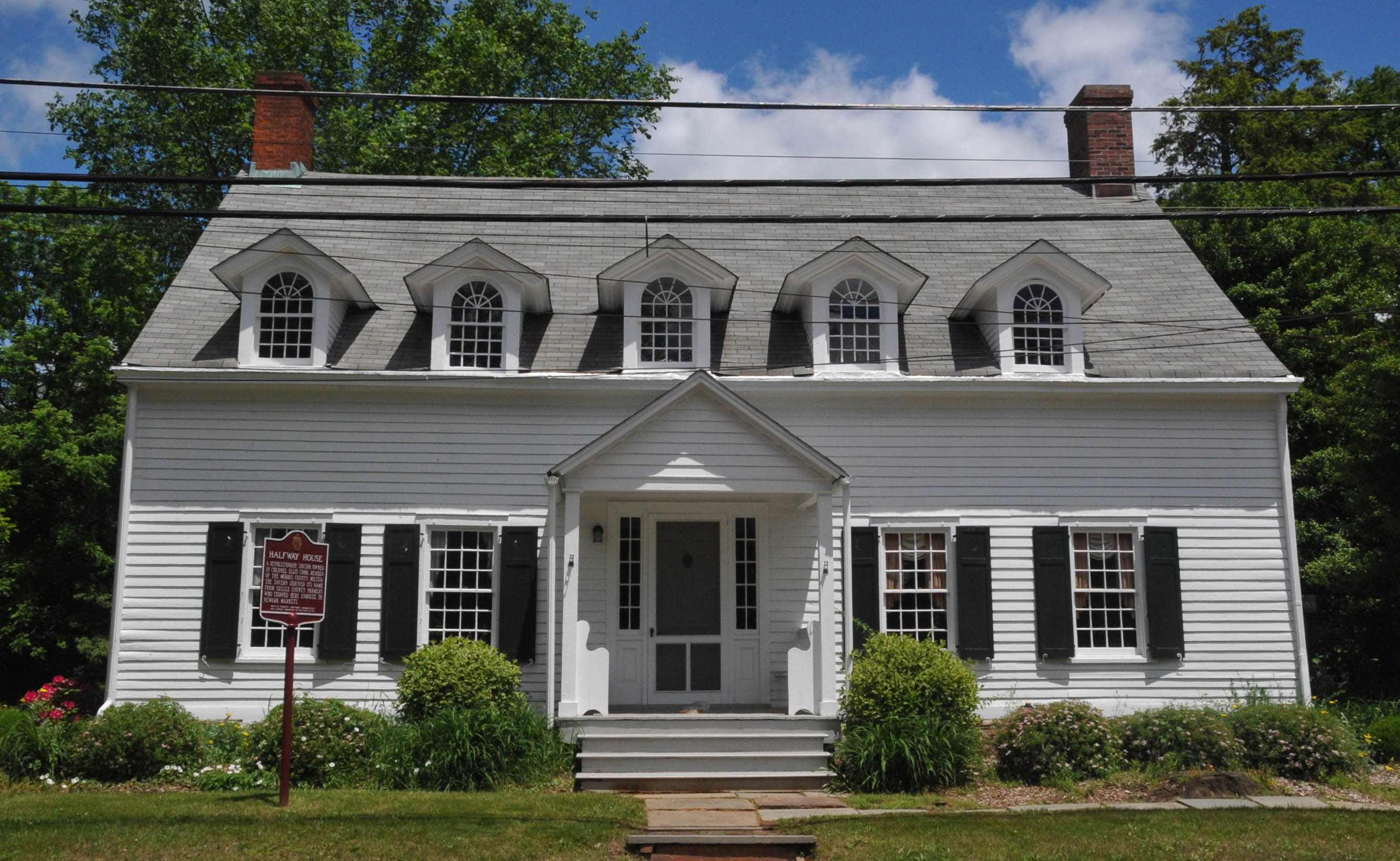
- Ellis Cook House

- Seal

- Location of Hanover Township in Morris County highlighted in red (right). Inset map: Location of Morris County in New Jersey highlighted in orange (left).

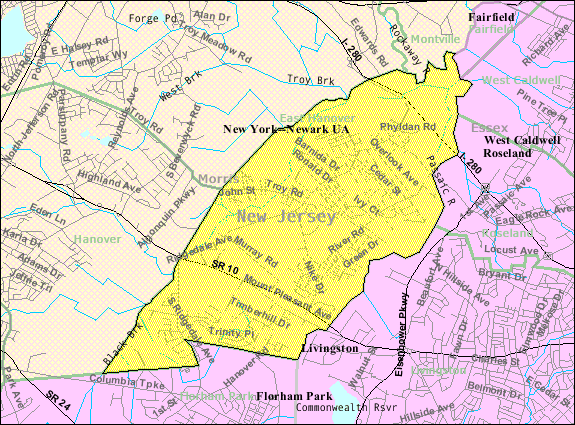
- Census Bureau map of East Hanover, New Jersey

- Location in Morris County Location in New Jersey Location in the United States
- Coordinates: 40.818553°N 74.363742°W
- Country: United States
- State: New Jersey
- County: Morris
- Incorporated: May 9, 1928

Government
  - Type: Faulkner Act (small municipality)
  - Body: Township Council
  - Mayor: Joseph Pannullo (R, term ends December 31, 2027)
  - Municipal clerk: Nicolette J. Riggi

Area
  - Total: 8.10 sq mi (20.98 km^{2})
  - Land: 7.88 sq mi (20.40 km^{2})
  - Water: 0.22 sq mi (0.58 km^{2}) 2.79%
  - Rank: 231st of 565 in state 19th of 39 in county
- Elevation: 226 ft (69 m)

Population (2020)
  - Total: 11,105
  - Estimate (2024): 11,232
  - Rank: 224th of 565 in state 17th of 39 in county
  - Density: 1,410.2/sq mi (544.5/km^{2})
  - Rank: 344th of 565 in state 21st of 39 in county
- Time zone: UTC−05:00 (Eastern (EST))
  - Summer (DST): UTC−04:00 (Eastern (EDT))
- ZIP Code: 07936
- Area code: 973
- FIPS code: 3402719210
- GNIS feature ID: 0882192
- Website: www.easthanovertownship.com

East Hanover Township is a township in Morris County, in the U.S. state of New Jersey. As of the 2020 United States census, the township's population was 11,105, a decrease of 52 (−0.5%) from the 2010 census count of 11,157, which in turn reflected a decline of 236 (−2.1%) from the 11,393 counted in the 2000 census.

Located between the Passaic and Whippany rivers, East Hanover shares a border with four Essex County municipalities; but only has roadways that connect the township with neighboring Livingston and Roseland.

East Hanover is notably home to the North American headquarters of Mondelez International (parent company of Nabisco) and the pharmaceutical company Novartis.

== History ==
The Township of Hanover was established on December 7, 1720, and named in honor of the British King George I of the German dynastic House of Hanover. The boundaries of East Hanover are defined by the joining of two rivers, the Whippany River to the west and north and the Passaic River to the east and north. This geographic effect led to the early name of East Hanover, "Hanover Neck." Since the creation of Hanover Township in 1720, its size has been considerably decreased as the population of the area has increased. Originally encompassing large portions of Morris County and parts of both Sussex and Warren County, Hanover Township became too unwieldy for a single local government and municipalities split off from the township over time.

East Hanover was incorporated as a township by an act of the New Jersey Legislature on March 12, 1928, from portions of Hanover Township, based on the results of a referendum held on May 9, 1928, that split off both East Hanover Township and Parsippany–Troy Hills from Hanover Township.

== Geography ==
According to the United States Census Bureau, the township had a total area of 8.10 square miles (20.98 km^{2}), including 7.88 square miles (20.40 km^{2}) of land and 0.23 square miles (0.58 km^{2}) of water (2.79%).

Unincorporated communities, localities and place names located partially or completely within the township include Cooks Bridge, Hanover, Hanover Neck and Swinefield Bridge.

The township borders the Morris County municipalities Florham Park, Hanover Township, Montville, Parsippany–Troy Hills; and the Essex County municipalities of Fairfield Township, Livingston, Roseland, and West Caldwell.

As of 2026, the township is a member of Local Leaders for Responsible Planning in order to address the township's Mount Laurel doctrine-based housing obligations.

== Demographics ==
Historical population
Census	Pop.	Note	%±
1930	946		—
1940	1,579		66.9%
1950	2,151		36.2%
1960	4,379		103.6%
1970	7,734		76.6%
1980	9,319		20.5%
1990	9,926		6.5%
2000	11,393		14.8%
2010	11,157		−2.1%
2020	11,105		−0.5%
2024 (est.)	11,232		1.1%
Population sources:1930 1940–2000 2000; 2010 2020

=== 2020 census ===
East Hanover township, New Jersey – Racial and ethnic composition Note: the US Census treats Hispanic/Latino as an ethnic category. This table excludes Latinos from the racial categories and assigns them to a separate category. Hispanics/Latinos may be of any race.
Race / Ethnicity (NH = Non-Hispanic)	Pop 2000	Pop 2010	Pop 2020	% 2000	% 2010	% 2020
White alone (NH)	9,921	9,042	8,450	87.08%	81.04%	76.09%
Black or African American alone (NH)	66	90	141	0.58%	0.81%	1.27%
Native American or Alaska Native alone (NH)	3	4	4	0.03%	0.04%	0.04%
Asian alone (NH)	1,269	1,322	1,425	11.14%	11.85%	12.83%
Native Hawaiian or Pacific Islander alone (NH)	0	0	0	0.00%	0.00%	0.00%
Other race alone (NH)	27	15	30	0.24%	0.27%	0.27%
Mixed race or Multiracial (NH)	107	84	179	0.94%	0.75%	1.61%
Hispanic or Latino (any race)	312	600	876	2.74%	5.38%	7.89%
Total	11,393	11,157	11,105	100.00%	100.00%	100.0%

=== 2010 census ===
The 2010 United States census counted 11,157 people, 3,893 households, and 3,149 families in the township. The population density was 1,413.7 per square mile (545.8/km^{2}). There were 3,976 housing units at an average density of 503.8 per square mile (194.5/km^{2}). The racial makeup was 85.11% (9,496) White, 0.83% (93) Black or African American, 0.08% (9) Native American, 11.92% (1,330) Asian, 0.00% (0) Pacific Islander, 0.94% (105) from other races, and 1.11% (124) from two or more races. Hispanic or Latino of any race were 5.38% (600) of the population.

Of the 3,893 households, 31.2% had children under the age of 18; 69.4% were married couples living together; 8.3% had a female householder with no husband present and 19.1% were non-families. Of all households, 16.3% were made up of individuals and 9.2% had someone living alone who was 65 years of age or older. The average household size was 2.86 and the average family size was 3.22.

21.5% of the population were under the age of 18, 6.2% from 18 to 24, 21.3% from 25 to 44, 31.8% from 45 to 64, and 19.3% who were 65 years of age or older. The median age was 45.6 years. For every 100 females, the population had 91.5 males. For every 100 females ages 18 and older there were 89.9 males.

The Census Bureau's 2006–2010 American Community Survey showed that (in 2010 inflation-adjusted dollars) median household income was $116,528 (with a margin of error of +/− $16,406) and the median family income was $122,074 (+/− $5,756). Males had a median income of $74,054 (+/− $9,723) versus $42,500 (+/− $12,460) for females. The per capita income for the township was $49,755 (+/− $5,660). About 2.5% of families and 2.6% of the population were below the poverty line, including 1.5% of those under age 18 and 7.3% of those age 65 or over.

=== 2000 census ===
As of the 2000 United States census there were 11,393 people, 3,843 households, and 3,212 families residing in the township. The population density was 1,396.6 inhabitants per square mile (539.2/km^{2}). There were 3,895 housing units at an average density of 477.5 per square mile (184.4/km^{2}). The racial makeup of the township was 87.08% White, 0.58% African American, 0.03% Native American, 11.14% Asian, 0.24% from other races, and 0.94% from two or more races. Hispanic or Latino of any race were 2.74% of the population.

As of the 2000 Census, 35.6% of East Hanover residents were of Italian ancestry, the 15th-highest percentage of any municipality in the United States, and sixth-highest in New Jersey, among all places with more than 1,000 residents identifying their ancestry.

There were 3,843 households, out of which 34.2% had children under the age of 18 living with them, 72.6% were married couples living together, 8.2% had a female householder with no husband present, and 16.4% were non-families. 13.6% of all households were made up of individuals, and 6.2% had someone living alone who was 65 years of age or older. The average household size was 2.96 and the average family size was 3.26.

In the township the population was spread out, with 22.5% under the age of 18, 6.4% from 18 to 24, 28.3% from 25 to 44, 28.2% from 45 to 64, and 14.6% who were 65 years of age or older. The median age was 41 years. For every 100 females, there were 94.0 males. For every 100 females age 18 and over, there were 91.9 males.

The median income for a household in the township was $82,133, and the median income for a family was $88,348. Males had a median income of $58,333 versus $36,069 for females. The per capita income for the township was $32,129. About 1.3% of families and 1.7% of the population were below the poverty line, including 0.2% of those under age 18 and 3.4% of those age 65 or over.

== Government ==
=== Local government ===
East Hanover operates within the Faulkner Act, formally known as the Optional Municipal Charter Law, under Small Municipality plan 3 form of New Jersey municipal government, as implemented as of January 1, 1992, based on the recommendations of a Charter Study Commission. The township is one of 18 municipalities (of the 564) statewide that use this form of government, which is only available to municipalities with fewer than 12,000 residents at the time of adoption. The governing body under the Small Municipality plan is comprised of the Mayor and the Township Council. The mayor is elected to a four-year term and four councilmembers are elected to three-year terms, all elected at-large on a partisan basis as part of the November general election. Councilmembers are elected on a staggered basis in a three-year cycle, with either one or two seats coming up for election each year.

As of 2026, East Hanover's Mayor is Republican Joseph Pannullo, whose term of office ends December 31, 2027. He has been serving as mayor since January 1, 2008. The Township Council is comprised of Council President Michael Martorelli (R, 2027), Brian T. Brokaw Sr. (R, 2025), Frank A. DeMaio Jr. (R, 2026) and Carolyn Jandoli (R, 2026).

In February 2023, the mayor and the four council members, all of whom had been elected as Democrats, changed their political affiliation and became Republicans.

=== Federal, state and county representation ===
East Hanover Township is located in the 11th Congressional District and is part of New Jersey's 26th state legislative district.

For the 119th United States Congress, New Jersey's 11th congressional district is represented by Analilia Mejia (D, Glen Ridge) who was elected in a 2026 special election to serve for the remainder of the Congress following the resignation Mikie Sherrill (D, Montclair), who was elected Governor of New Jersey in 2025. New Jersey is represented in the United States Senate by Democrats Cory Booker (Newark, term ends 2027) and Andy Kim (Moorestown, term ends 2031).

For the 2026–2027 session, the 26th legislative district of the New Jersey Legislature is represented in the State Senate by Joseph Pennacchio (R, Rockaway Township) and in the General Assembly by Brian Bergen (R, Denville Township) and Jay Webber (R, Morris Plains).

Morris County is governed by a Board of County Commissioners comprised of seven members who are elected at-large in partisan elections to three-year terms on a staggered basis, with either one or three seats up for election each year as part of the November general election. Actual day-to-day operation of departments is supervised by County Administrator Deena Leary.

As of 2026, Morris County's Commissioners (with all terms ending December 31) are Director Stephen H. Shaw (R, Mountain Lakes, 2027), Deputy Director John Krickus (R, Washington Township, 2027), Douglas Cabana (R, Boonton Township, 2028), Thomas J. Mastrangelo (R, Montville, 2028), Christine Myers (R, Harding Township, 2028), Tayfun Selen (R, Chatham Township, 2026), and Deborah Smith (R, Denville Township, 2027).

The county's constitutional officers are County Clerk Ann F. Grossi (R, Parsippany–Troy Hills, 2028), Sheriff James M. Gannon (R, Boonton Township, 2025) and Surrogate Heather Darling (R, Roxbury, 2029).

=== Politics ===
United States presidential election results for East Hanover Township 2024 2020 2016 2012 2008 2004
Year	Republican		Democratic		Third party(ies)	
Year	No.	%	No.	%	No.	%
2024	4,962	70.02%	2,033	28.69%	92	1.30%
2020	5,025	66.15%	2,510	33.04%	61	0.80%
2016	4,501	68.91%	1,886	28.87%	145	2.22%
2012	4,150	68.36%	1,888	31.10%	33	0.54%
2008	4,452	68.36%	2,017	30.97%	44	0.68%
2004	4,258	67.80%	1,988	31.66%	34	0.54%

As of June 2024, there were a total of 8,983 registered voters in East Hanover Township, of which 3,950 (44.0%) were registered as Republicans, 1,984 (22.1%) were registered as Democrats, and 3,049 (33.9%) were registered as Unaffiliated. East Hanover is considered as reliably Republican in all township, state, and federal elections, with the party historically winning the township in every presidential election since at least 2004. In the 2024 United States presidential election, Republican Donald Trump won East Hanover with 70.02% of votes cast, higher than any Republican did compared to every presidential election since at least 2004, including himself in both 2016 and 2020.

Gubernatorial election results for East Hanover Township
Year	Republican		Democratic		Third party(ies)	
Year	No.	%	No.	%	No.	%
2025	4,099	68.94%	1,828	30.74%	19	0.32%
2021	3,699	73.67%	1,304	25.97%	18	0.36%
2017	2,319	65.16%	1,197	33.63%	43	1.21%
2013	3,075	74.46%	1,017	24.62%	38	0.92%
2009	3,222	68.35%	1,189	25.22%	303	6.43%
2005	2,646	62.13%	1,541	36.18%	72	1.69%

In the 2013 gubernatorial election, Republican Chris Christie received 74.5% of the vote (3,075 cast), ahead of Democrat Barbara Buono with 24.6% (1,017 votes), and other candidates with 0.9% (38 votes), among the 4,253 ballots cast by the township's 8,193 registered voters (123 ballots were spoiled), for a turnout of 51.9%. In the 2009 gubernatorial election, Republican Chris Christie received 67.2% of the vote (3,222 ballots cast), ahead of Democrat Jon Corzine with 24.8% (1,189 votes), Independent Chris Daggett with 5.9% (282 votes) and other candidates with 0.4% (21 votes), among the 4,792 ballots cast by the township's 8,208 registered voters, yielding a 58.4% turnout.

United States Senate election results for East Hanover Township1
Year	Republican		Democratic		Third party(ies)	
Year	No.	%	No.	%	No.	%
2024	4,587	69.59%	1,929	29.27%	75	1.14%
2018	3,730	69.18%	1,563	28.99%	99	1.84%
2012	3,536	65.19%	1,859	34.27%	29	0.53%
2006	2,686	65.62%	1,354	33.08%	53	1.29%

United States Senate election results for East Hanover Township2
Year	Republican		Democratic		Third party(ies)	
Year	No.	%	No.	%	No.	%
2020	4,717	65.40%	2,436	33.77%	60	0.83%
2014	2,147	64.24%	1,156	34.59%	39	1.17%
2013	1,754	71.39%	689	28.04%	14	0.57%
2008	3,617	63.76%	2,000	35.25%	56	0.99%

== Education ==
The East Hanover School District serves public school students in pre-kindergarten through eighth grade. As of the 2023–24 school year, the district, comprised of three schools, had an enrollment of 1,003 students and 106.0 classroom teachers (on an FTE basis), for a student–teacher ratio of 9.5:1. The schools in the district (with 2023–24 enrollment data from the National Center for Education Statistics) are Frank J. Smith Elementary School with 328 students in grades PreK–2, Central Elementary School with 347 students in grades 3–5 and East Hanover Middle School with 319 students in grades 6–8.

Students in ninth through twelfth grades for public school are served by the Hanover Park Regional High School District, attending Hanover Park High School in East Hanover, together with students from Florham Park. The district also serves students from the neighboring community of Hanover Township at Whippany Park High School in the Whippany section of Hanover Township. As of the 2023–24 school year, the high school had an enrollment of 713 students and 72.3 classroom teachers (on an FTE basis), for a student–teacher ratio of 9.9:1. Seats on the high school district's nine-member board of education are allocated based on the population of the constituent municipalities, with East Hanover Township assigned three seats.

Saint Rose of Lima Academy was a Catholic school for students in preschool through eighth grade that operated under the auspices of the Roman Catholic Diocese of Paterson. The school was closed at the end of the 2015–16 school year.

== Parks and recreation ==
East Hanover contains many public parks and open space reserved for a variety of uses. Its 823 acres (333 ha) of public space are either maintained by the township itself, the Morris County Parks Commission, the non-profit Wildlife Preserves, Inc., or the State of New Jersey.

Joseph G. Lurker Memorial Park, commonly referred to as just simply Lurker Park, is an 89-acre (36 ha) municipal park located off of Ridgedale Avenue (County Route 632). The park contains the municipal pool, a large playground, an artificial turf football field, basketball courts and a seasonal ice-skating rink. Soccer fields, bocce ball courts, baseball fields, four tennis courts, and four softball fields are also provided. The township’s recreation center, Tom Rinaldi Recreation Center, which offers sports programs and other activities, is also located in the park. A paved multi-use path, paired with benches, picnic tables, and a pavilion seating area, encompasses the perimeter of the park. At the corner of Ridgedale Avenue (County Route 632) and Eagle Rock Avenue (County Route 611) is a small area consisting of a separate paved walking path, bicycle racks and a gazebo.

Scattered throughout East Hanover are smaller municipal parks, such as Town Square Park, which is located in the town center along Ridgedale Avenue (County Route 632) near the township library. It contains a small, paved multi-use path, seating area, and contains various memorials and historical monuments. Sommer Park, located at the end of Fairway Drive near Frank J. Smith Elementary School, consists of a baseball field. Dean D'ambola Park, situated off of Mount Pleasant Avenue (County Route 677), contains an artificial turf baseball field. The Whippany and Passaic River blueways, Troy Road Greenway, Fox Run Preserve, Harvest Grove and the historic Ridgedale Airport (Hanover Airport) are other public sites owned and maintained by the township.

The 3,100-acre (1,300 ha) freshwater wetlands known as Troy Meadows, owned and maintained by Wildlife Preserves, Inc., is a located within East Hanover, with 225 acres (91 ha) being within the township's borders. Troy Meadows is designated as a National Natural Landmark by the National Park Service and a Natural Heritage Priority site by the New Jersey Department of Environmental Protection (NJDEP). It contains a 2-mile (3.2 km) boardwalk. Nearby is Hatfield Swamp, a wildlife reserve with 1,000 acres (400 ha) of freshwater marshes and forested land, bordered by the Rockaway, Passaic and Whippany rivers. Much of the swamp is owned and managed by both the township and the Land Conservancy of New Jersey. It is accessible by canoe or kayak from the Essex County Environmental Center in neighboring Roseland.

Patriots' Path is a 55-mile (89 km) multi-use path with 35 miles (56 km) of spur trails owned by Morris County that begins in Washington Township. It continues through and ends in East Hanover, where it connects to the Lenape Trail in Roseland. Within the township, the trail mostly runs along Ridgedale Avenue (County Route 632) and travels through Lurker Park.

In October 2024, Morris County approved $1.3 million in trail grants as part of the county trail system. For East Hanover, it includes the construction of a multi-use path equipped with boardwalk bridges and an improved surface, beginning at two points, Lurker Park and Patriots' Path, and culminating at River Road.

== Transportation ==
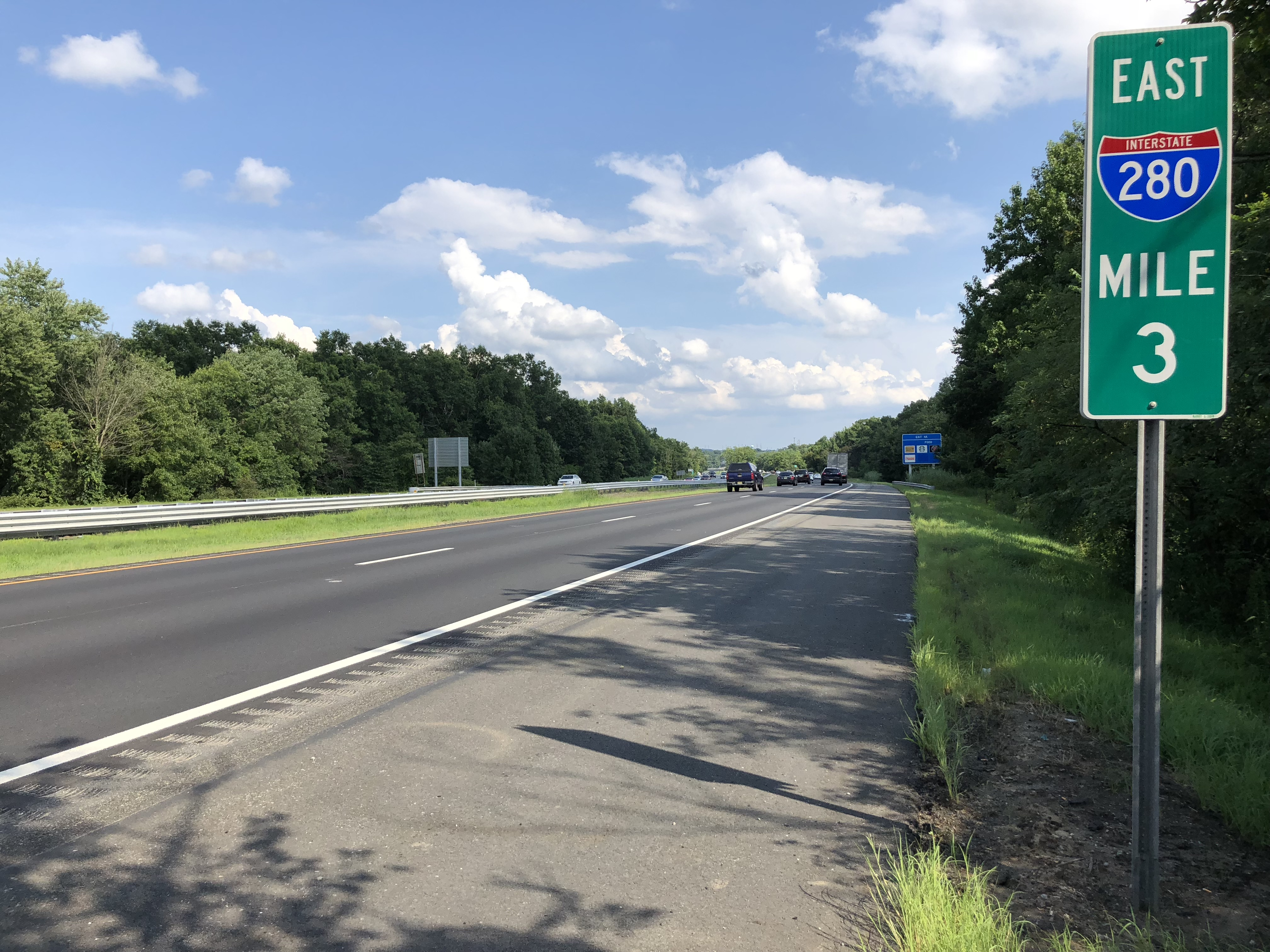
Interstate 280 eastbound in East Hanover

=== Roads and highways ===
As of May 2010, the township had a total of 58.58 miles (94.28 km) of roadways, of which 47.53 miles (76.49 km) were maintained by the municipality, 7.61 miles (12.25 km) by Morris County and 3.44 miles (5.54 km) by the New Jersey Department of Transportation.

Interstate 280 is the most prominent highway within East Hanover Township, though there are no exits within the township. The nearest exits, 1 and 4, are both just outside the township in neighboring Parsippany–Troy Hills and Roseland, respectively. Route 10 is the main highway providing local access to East Hanover. Ridgedale Avenue (County Route 632), which begins at Columbia Turnpike (County Route 510) in Florham Park and ends at New Road in Parsippany-Troy Hills, travels through East Hanover and provides access to Route 10 and Interstate 280. A portion of the road also serves as the town center.

=== Public transportation ===
NJ Transit provides bus service to Newark on the 73 route, with local service on the 872 route.

The nearest passenger rail is offered by NJ Transit at Madison Station, which is located 6 miles (9.7 km) south of East Hanover in Madison, along the Morristown Line. Commuter service is provided with trains heading to Hoboken Terminal, and to New York Penn Station in Midtown Manhattan via the Kearny Connection.

The Harrison PATH Station in Harrison, operated by the Port Authority Trans-Hudson (PATH), offers direct commuter service along the Newark-World Trade Center line to the World Trade Center station in Lower Manhattan. It is located about 15 miles (24 km) east of East Hanover and accessible via Interstate 280 using exit 16.

The Whippany Line of the Morristown and Erie Railway, a small freight line, traverses the township. Established in 1895, the line runs from Morristown and runs through East Hanover Township and Hanover Township to Roseland.

=== Aviation ===
Morristown Municipal Airport in Hanover Township is a general aviation airport that is 6 miles (9.7 km) southwest of East Hanover.

Newark Liberty International Airport, encompassing the cities of Newark and Elizabeth, is situated approximately 19 miles (31 km) east of the township.

== Media ==
=== Newspapers ===
The East Hanover/Florham Park Life publishes a newspaper monthly, also in a digital version, along with other special editions and sections, serving East Hanover and neighboring Florham Park.

The Hanover Eagle, which is operated by the New Jersey Hills Media Group, which serves East Hanover and nearby Hanover, publishes local news for the two townships weekly. It also publishes online versions.

=== Online ===
News published for the township online is posted by TAPInto East Hanover/Florham Park and the East Hanover-Florham Park Patch, with both also serving Florham Park. It could also be found on the official township website.

== Places of interest ==
- Gate of Heaven Cemetery, operated by the Roman Catholic Archdiocese of Newark, was established in 1937.

== Notable people ==
People who were born in, residents of, or otherwise closely associated with East Hanover include:

- Melanie Adams (born 1969), educator and museum administrator, who is director of the Anacostia Community Museum in Washington, D.C.
- Jerry Della Salla (born 1969), decorated combat soldier who fought in the Battle of Abu Ghraib, and later co-starred in the Matt Damon war film Green Zone
- Jedd Fisch (born 1976), football coach who didn't play football in high school or college
- Mary Jane Marcasiano (born 1955), fashion and costume designer, film producer, and social entrepreneur
- Nicole "Snooki" Polizzi (born 1987), reality star of Jersey Shore and its spin-off, Snooki & JWoww
- Stephanie Pollack, engineer and lawyer who served as Massachusetts Secretary of Transportation from 2015 to 2021
- Frank Saul (1924–2019), National Basketball Association player
- Frank Sowinski, former professional basketball player.
- Buddy Valastro (born 1977), owner of Carlo's Bakery, as featured on Cake Boss
