= Hanover Park High School =

High school in Morris County, New Jersey, US

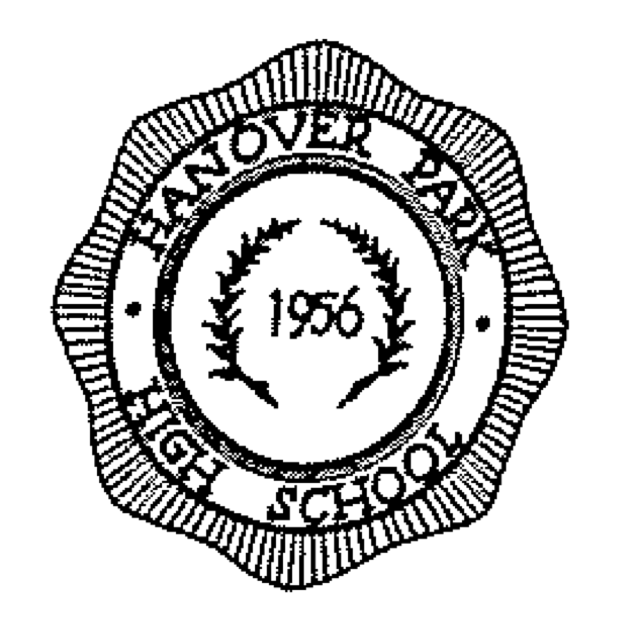

Location
- 63 Mount Pleasant Avenue; East Hanover Township, Morris County, New Jersey 07936; United States; 40.805343°N 74.372315°W

Information
- Type: Public high school
- Established: 1956
- School district: Hanover Park Regional High School District
- NCES School ID: 340666004244
- Principal: Thomas J. Callanan
- Faculty: 70.1 FTEs
- Grades: 9-12
- Enrollment: 706 (as of 2024–25)
- Student to teacher ratio: 10.1:1
- Colors: Black and Gold
- Athletics conference: Northwest Jersey Athletic Conference (general); North Jersey Super Football Conference (football)
- Team name: Hornets
- Publication: The Hornet's Sting (literary magazine)
- Newspaper: The Forum
- Yearbook: Pathways
- Website: www.hanoverpark.org

Hanover Park High School is a four-year comprehensive public high school that serves students in ninth through twelfth grades from East Hanover Township and Florham Park, in Morris County, in the U.S. state of New Jersey, operating as one of the two secondary schools of the Hanover Park Regional High School District. Hanover Park's sister school is Whippany Park High School, which serves students from Hanover Township, where the school is located. The school opened in 1956.

As of the 2024–25 school year, the school had an enrollment of 706 students and 70.1 classroom teachers (on an FTE basis), for a student–teacher ratio of 10.1:1. There were 15 students (2.1% of enrollment) eligible for free lunch and 3 (0.4% of students) eligible for reduced-cost lunch.

== History ==
The first campus-style high school facility in New Jersey, the school was designed to accommodate 1,000 students when complete and was estimated to cost $2.25 million (equivalent to $26.6 million in 2025). In 1956, the architect of the Hanover Park facility received an award for its design.

The school's original master plan envisioned a series of one-story buildings labeled A-H, with A-F academic, G for the gymnasium, H for wood/metal shop. There is a total of 32 classrooms. A spacious central core building housed administration, an auditorium, and separate wings with more classrooms for music (band and choir), drama, arts, and home economics. Until 2008, students had no lockers and walked outdoors after each succeeding period. The design, good for West Coast schools, was quickly deemed inappropriate for the heavy rains and harsh winters of northern New Jersey. The school was reconfigured in the 2000s, and by enclosing buildings between existing structures, the campus now has five larger structures rather than the original ten smaller ones. As part of a construction project, students were provided with individual book lockers that were available at the start of the 2007–08 school year.

== Awards, recognition and rankings ==
The school was the 26th-ranked public high school in New Jersey out of 339 schools statewide in New Jersey Monthly magazine's September 2014 cover story on the state's "Top Public High Schools", using a new ranking methodology. The school had been ranked 57th in the state of 328 schools in 2012, after being ranked 96th in 2010 out of 322 schools listed. The magazine ranked the school 67th in 2008 out of 316 schools. Schooldigger.com ranked the school 117th out of 381 public high schools statewide in its 2011 rankings (a decrease of 2 positions from the 2010 ranking) which were based on the combined percentage of students classified as proficient or above proficient on the mathematics (85.2%) and language arts literacy (96.3%) components of the High School Proficiency Assessment (HSPA).

In its listing of "America's Best High Schools 2016", the school was ranked 365th out of 500 best high schools in the country; it was ranked 41st among all high schools in New Jersey and 24th among the state's non-magnet schools.

In its 2013 report on "America's Best High Schools", The Daily Beast ranked the school 575th in the nation among participating public high schools and 45th among schools in New Jersey.

Hanover Park High School was recognized as a 2013 New Jersey and National District of Character. Hanover Park Regional High School District is the first New Jersey School District to receive a Character Education Partnership National School District of Character.

== Athletics ==
The Hanover Park High School Hornets compete in the Northwest Jersey Athletic Conference, which is comprised of public and private high schools in Morris, Sussex and Warren counties, and was established following a reorganization of sports leagues in Northern New Jersey by the New Jersey State Interscholastic Athletic Association (NJSIAA). Prior to the NJSIAA's 2009 realignment, the school competed in the Iron Hills Conference. With 633 students in grades 10–12, the school was classified by the NJSIAA for the 2019–20 school year as Group II for most athletic competition purposes, which included schools with an enrollment of 486 to 758 students in that grade range. The football team competes in the American Blue division of the North Jersey Super Football Conference, which includes 112 schools competing in 20 divisions, making it the nation's biggest football-only high school sports league. The school was classified by the NJSIAA as Group II North for football for 2024–2026, which included schools with 484 to 683 students.

The school participates as the host school / lead agency for joint cooperative boys / girls golf, boys lacrosse and boys / girls swimming teams with Whippany Park High School, while Whippany Park is the host school for co-op ice hockey and girls lacrosse teams. These co-op programs operate under agreements scheduled to expire at the end of the 2023–24 school year.

The boys cross country team won the Group III state championship in 1962 and 1963.

The ice hockey team won the Gordon Cup in 1964; the Hanover Park / Whippany Park co-op team won the Haas Cup in 2000, 2005, 2006 and 2011–2013. In the 2010–11, 2011–12, and 2012–13 seasons, the Park Regional Hockey Team (Hanover Park combined with Whippany Park) won back-to-back-to-back Haas Cup Championships.

The girls' basketball team won the Group III state championship in 1988, defeating Lakewood High School by a score of 62–53 in the tournament final.

The football team won the North II Group II state sectional title in 1990 with a 51–14 win against Abraham Clark High School in the championship game.

The baseball team led by outfielder Mike Fillipone and pitcher Jon Noss won the Group II state championship in 1997 (against John F. Kennedy High School (Woodbridge) in the title game) and 2006 (vs. Governor Livingston High School). The team has won the Morris County Tournament three times, tied for the fourth-most in tournament history, winning in 1978, 1984 and 2003. The 1997 pulled ahead 5–0 in the first inning and held off multiple rallies by JFK Woodbridge to win the Group II state title by a score of 11–10 in the playoff finals. The 2006 team finished the season with a 23–8 record after winning the Group II title by defeating Governor Livingston by a score of 8–0 in the championship game.

The girls track team won the 2004 Group I indoor relay championship.

The girls track team won the outdoor track Group II state title in 2007 as co-champion with Haddon Heights High School.

The boys' wrestling team won the Group II state championship in 2015. The team won the North II Group II state sectional title in 1997, 1998, 2002, 2014, 2015, 2017–2019 and 2022, and the North I Group II title in, 2004, 2005, 2012, 2013 and 2022–2025.

== Academic team ==
The Hanover Park High School Academic Decathlon Team, led by Coach Joseph Lunetta, won the 2008 New Jersey state championship. They scored 42,405.5 out of 60,000 possible points for a 102.7-point victory over runners-up Parsippany Hills High School.

At the national finals held in Garden Grove, California, the Academic Team placed sixth in Division III and twentieth overall with a score of 39,337.0. Senior Stephanie Wang was the highest scorer on the team, obtaining 8199.8 out of a possible 10,000 points. The team won the Division III Rookie Award, given to the school competing at the finals for the first time that amasses the largest number of points.

== Administration ==
The school's principal is Thomas J. Callanan. His core administration team includes two assistant principals.

== Sister school ==
Whippany Park High School, whose doors opened in 1967, serves Hanover Township. The school is located in the Whippany section of Hanover Township.

== Notable alumni ==
- Harry Fanok (born 1940), right-handed pitcher who made 16 appearances, all in relief, for the 1963–64 St. Louis Cardinals
- Jedd Fisch (born 1976), college and pro football coach who is currently the head coach at the University of Washington
- Laurel Hester (1956–2006, class of 1974), police lieutenant in Ocean County, New Jersey, whose story was featured in the documentary Freeheld
- Mary Jane Marcasiano (born 1955), fashion and costume designer, film producer and social entrepreneur
- Archie Moore (born 1940), MLB player who appeared in 40 games for the New York Yankees in 1964 and 1965
- Sylvia Pogorzelski (born 1985; class of 2003), Miss New Jersey USA 2005.
- Frank Sowinski, former professional basketball player
- Linda Tripp (1949–2020, class of 1967), central figure in the Clinton/Lewinsky scandal
