= Herley Industries =

American microwave technology company

- Type: Private
- Traded as: Nasdaq: HRLY
- Industry: Microwave technology
- Founded: 1965; 61 years ago
- Headquarters: Lancaster, Pennsylvania, United States
- Products: Defense and commercial technology
- Number of employees: approximately 450
- Parent: CAES Systems Holdings
- Website: caes.com

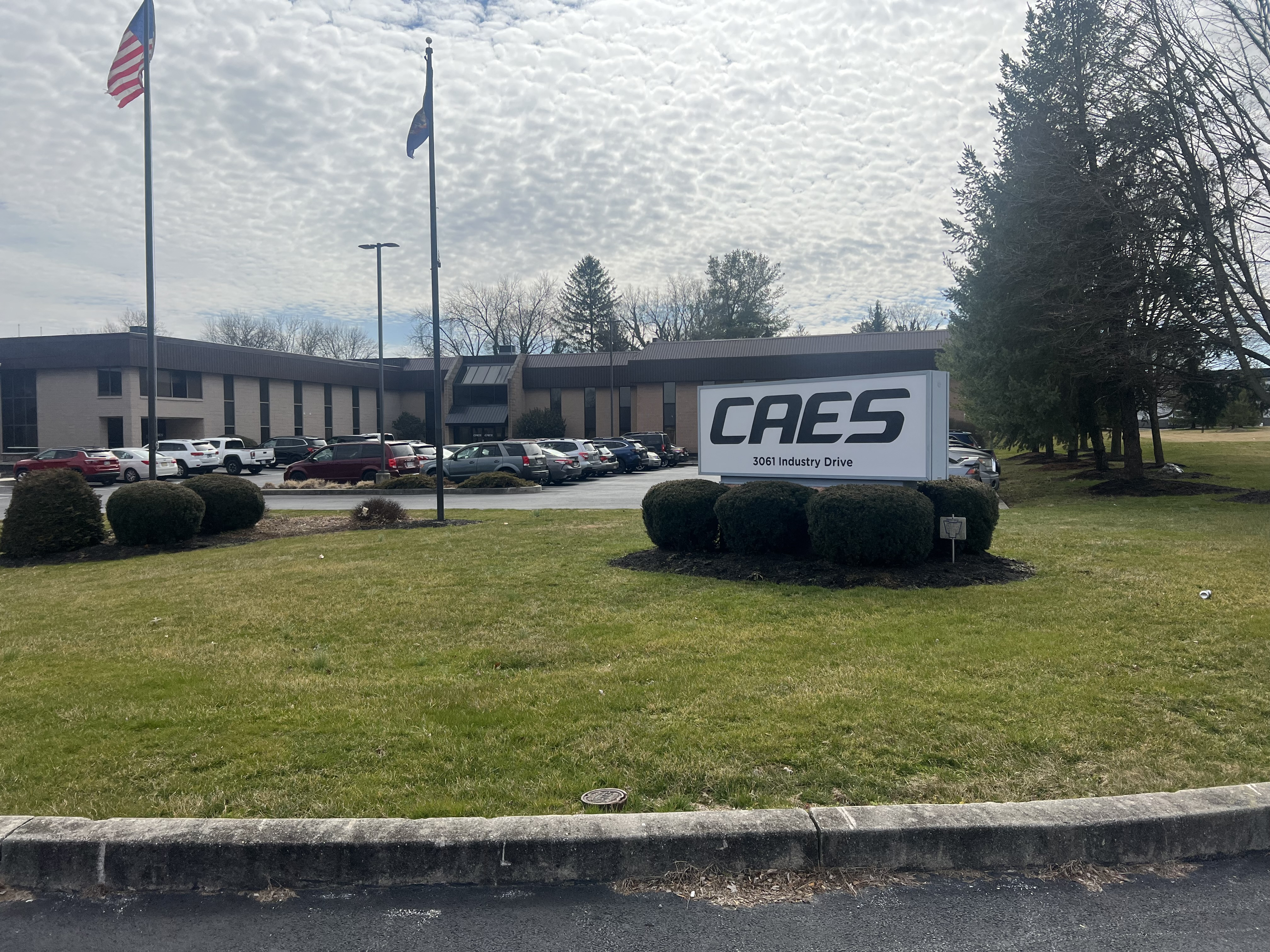

Herley Industries, based in Lancaster, Pennsylvania, is an American company that specializes in supplying microwave and millimeter wave products to the defense and aerospace industries. They provide solutions for radars, flight instrumentation, weapon sensors, electronic warfare systems, and guidance systems for contractors, the U.S. government, and governments and militaries worldwide.

== History ==
Herley was founded in 1965. In March 2023, Herley was acquired by CAES Systems Holdings.

=== Growth and acquisitions ===
Through a small acquisition in June 1986, the company entered the flight instrumentation business beginning with the design and manufacture of range safety transponders.

In September 1992, the company acquired substantially all of the assets of Micro-Dynamics, Inc. of Woburn, Massachusetts, a microwave subsystem designer and manufacturer.

In June 1993, the company acquired Vega Precision Laboratories, Inc. ("Vega") of Vienna, Virginia.

In July 1995, the company acquired the government systems business of Stewart Warner Electronics of Chicago, Illinois, a manufacturer of high frequency radio and IFF interrogator systems.

In August 1997, the company acquired Metraplex Corporation of Frederick, Maryland, allowing the company entry into the airborne PCM and FM telemetry and data acquisition systems market.

In January 1999, Herley Industries acquired General Microwave Corporation of Farmingdale, New York, a microwave subsystem manufacturer with a 30-year history in the industry.

In January 2000, Herley acquired Robinson Labs in Nashua, New Hampshire, a manufacturer of microwave components used in commercial wireless and defense applications.

In October 2000, Herley acquired American Microwave Technologies (AMT) in Anaheim, California, a manufacturer of solid-state broadband RF amplifiers used by the scientific and medical markets.

In September 2002, Herley acquired EW Simulation Technology Ltd., a UK manufacturer of electronic warfare simulator systems, increasing Herley's presence in the EW market and in the international market.

In March 2004, Herley acquired Communication Techniques, Inc., of Whippany, New Jersey, a manufacturer of phase-locked sources and fast frequency changing direct synthesizers.

In September 2004, Herley acquired Reliable System Services, of Melbourne, Florida, which has focused on satellite-based command & control systems for defense customers.

In February 2005, Herley acquired Micro Systems, Inc. of Fort Walton Beach, Florida. Micro Systems is a recognized market leader in engineering, design, and manufacturing of command & control systems for operation and tracking of unmanned aerial, seaborne, and ground targets and missiles.

In April 2005, Herley acquired Innovative Concepts, Inc., of McLean, Virginia a company providing wireless communications technology and real-time embedded systems, software, hardware, and high-speed processing in support of the defense industry. In November 2008, Herley sold ICI to Elbit Systems of America.

=== Federal indictment ===
In June 2006, the company and its former chairman, Lee N. Blatt were indicted on multiple charges in connection with purported activities resulting in alleged excessive profits by the company on three contracts with the U.S. Department of Defense. Three of the company's nine manufacturing plants were placed under suspension, meaning they could not initiate any new federal contracts. The plants affected were in Lancaster, Pennsylvania; Woburn, Massachusetts; and Farmingdale, New York. In addition, a Chicago marketing office was also suspended. At approximately the same time, Herley stock lost approximately 34% of its value, decreasing to $10.06 a share, its lowest since November 1998. In July 2010 the company settled for US$10 million without admitting any wrongdoing.

Lee N. Blatt retired at the time, and Myron Levy was chosen as his successor. On October 13, 2006, the company announced that it had reached an administrative agreement with the OGC Acquisition Integrity Office, Department of Navy. With this agreement, the suspension preventing new contract awards was lifted, and Herley resumed business dealings with both its DOD and prime contractor customers.

=== Subsequent history ===
In September 2008, Herley purchased Eyal Microwave Industries ('EMI') based in Kibbutz Eyal, Israel.

On July 22, 2009, Herley replaced Myron Levy as chief executive and chairman. The company stated that Levy's efforts had positioned it for future growth, but that it was “time for a completely new management team drawn from key personnel throughout the company with proven records of success, to move the company forward." David Lieberman, a previous member of the board and a partner with the New York firm of Beckman, Lieberman & Barandes LLP, was named chairman. Richard Poirier, who has been with Herley since 1992, was named the new CEO and president.

In 2015, Herley was acquired by Ultra Electronics. In August 2021, Ultra Electronics was bought by Cobham.

In March 2023, the Herley portion of Ultra Electronics was acquired by CAES.
