= Whippany Park High School =

High school in Morris County, New Jersey, US

Location
- 165 Whippany Road; Whippany, New Jersey, (Morris County) 07981; United States; 40.8156°N 74.4255°W

Information
- Type: Public high school
- Established: 1967
- School district: Hanover Park Regional High School District
- NCES School ID: 340666004246
- Principal: Christopher N. Kelly
- Faculty: 60.7 FTEs
- Grades: 9-12
- Enrollment: 594 (as of 2023–24)
- Student to teacher ratio: 9.8:1
- Colors: Cardinal & white
- Athletics conference: Northwest Jersey Athletic Conference (general); North Jersey Super Football Conference (football)
- Website: www.whippanypark.org

Whippany Park High School is a four-year comprehensive public high school that serves students in ninth through twelfth grade from Hanover Township in Morris County, in the U.S. state of New Jersey, operating as one of the two secondary schools of the Hanover Park Regional High School District. The other school in the district, Hanover Park High School, serves students from East Hanover and Florham Park.

As of the 2024–25 school year, the school had an enrollment of 584 students and 60.9 classroom teachers (on an FTE basis), for a student–teacher ratio of 9.6:1. There were 22 students (3.8% of enrollment) eligible for free lunch and 4 (0.7% of students) eligible for reduced-cost lunch.

== History ==
The school is located in the Whippany section of Hanover Township and was established in 1967 as the district's second facility.

== Awards, recognition and rankings ==
Whippany Park High School was the 46th-ranked public high school in New Jersey out of 339 schools statewide in New Jersey Monthly magazine's September 2014 cover story on the state's "Top Public High Schools", using a new ranking methodology. The school had been ranked 38th in the state of 328 schools in 2012, after being ranked 42nd in 2010 out of 322 schools listed. The magazine ranked the school 45th in 2008 out of 316 schools. The school was ranked 54th in the magazine's September 2006 issue, which included 316 schools across the state. Schooldigger.com ranked the school tied for 102nd out of 381 public high schools statewide in its 2011 rankings (an increase of 1 positions from the 2010 ranking) which were based on the combined percentage of students classified as proficient or above proficient on the mathematics (87.2%) and language arts literacy (95.8%) components of the High School Proficiency Assessment (HSPA).

In its listing of "America's Best High Schools 2016", the school was ranked 429th out of 500 best high schools in the country; it was ranked 48th among all high schools in New Jersey and 31st among the state's non-magnet schools.

In its 2013 report on "America's Best High Schools", The Daily Beast ranked the school 625th in the nation among participating public high schools and 49th among schools in New Jersey.

== Athletics ==
The Whippany Park High School Wildcats compete in the Northwest Jersey Athletic Conference which is comprised of public and private high schools in Morris, Sussex and Warren counties, and was established following a reorganization of sports leagues in Northern New Jersey under the jurisdiction of the New Jersey State Interscholastic Athletic Association (NJSIAA). Prior to the NJSIAA's 2009 reorganization, the school had competed in the Colonial Hills Conference, which included schools in Essex, Morris and Somerset counties. With 468 students in grades 10–12, the school was classified by the NJSIAA for the 2019–20 school year as Group I for most athletic competition purposes, which included schools with an enrollment of 75 to 476 students in that grade range. The football team competes in the National Blue division of the North Jersey Super Football Conference, which includes 112 schools competing in 20 divisions, making it the nation's biggest football-only high school sports league. The school was classified by the NJSIAA as Group I North for football for 2024–2026, which included schools with 254 to 474 students.

The school participates as the host school / lead agency for joint cooperative ice hockey and girls lacrosse teams with Hanover Park High School, while Hanover Park is the host school for co-op boys / girls golf, boys lacrosse and boys / girls swimming teams. These co-op programs operate under agreements scheduled to expire at the end of the 2023–24 school year.

The 1980 football team won the North II Group II state football title, beating three-time defending champion Madison High School by a score of 10–9 in the playoff finals. The victory culminated a 10–1 record for the season, in which the team beat two other state champions that year, Delbarton School 21-13 and Glen Ridge High School 17–6.

The girls cross country team won the Group II state championship in 1980.

The girls field hockey team won the North II Group II state sectional title in 1980 and the North II Group I title in 1981.

The softball team won the Group I state championship in 1982 (defeating Maple Shade High School in the finals of the playoffs), 1989 (vs. Gloucester City High School), 1990 (vs. Gloucester City), 1992 (vs. Woodbury High School), 1999 (vs. Bound Brook High School) and 2012 (vs. New Egypt High School), and won in Group II in 1984 (vs. Hammonton High School). The program's seven state titles are tied for fifth-most in the state. In 1982, the team won the program's first state title with a 5–1 win against Maple Shade in the Group I finals played at Mercer County Park. The 1984 team finished the season with a record of 24-7 after winning the Group II state title against Hammonton by a score of 5–1 in the finals. The 1989 team won the Group I championship with a 4–0 win against Gloucester City in the tournament final at the Trenton State College. The 1990 team repeated as Group I champion, finished the season 27-0 and extended their winning streak to 46 games with a 4–0 win against Gloucester City in the playoff finals. The 1992 team finished the season with a 29–0 record after a 5–2 win in the Group I championship game against Woodbury. NJ.com / The Star-Ledger ranked Whippany Park as their number-one softball team in the state in 1989, 1990 and 1992. The 1999 team finished the season with a 24–5 record after winning the Group I title with a 2–0 in the championship game against Bound Brook. The softball team were North II Group I sectional champions in 2010 with a 13–2 win against Hoboken High School. In 2011, the team won the North II Group I title with an 8–0 shutout in the championship game against New Providence High School, but lost to New Egypt High School in the Group I State finals by a score of 9–2. Whippany Park softball won the Morris County Championship back-to-back in 2006 and 2007 and hold the record for most Morris County tournament championships with nine. Whippany Park softball also holds the state record for consecutive victories with 75, a mark set by the teams which played from 1989 and 1991.

The boys soccer team won the Group I state title in 1988 (defeating runner-up Haddonfield Memorial High School in the playoff finals) and 2001 (as co-champion with Arthur P. Schalick High School). The team won the 1988 Group I state title with a 1–0 win in double overtime against Haddonfield Memorial High School. The team was declared co-champion with Arthur P. Schalick High School after a scoreless tie in the Group I final in 2001. The team won the 2003 Group I sectional championship with a 2–1 win over Bernards High School. The team won the 2006 North II Group II sectional championship with a 1–0 victory over Cliffside Park High School. On their way to the sectional final they defeated and shut out Harrison High School who was previously undefeated and ranked third in the state at the time. The team went on to become North Jersey Group II champs with a 2–0 victory over Newton High School. They lost in the Group II finals by a score of 1–0 to Haddonfield Memorial High School, which finished the season ranked 18th in the state.

The boys cross country team won the Group I state title in 1991 and won in Group II in 1992. In 2007, they won the Group I state sectional title.

The Whippany Park / Hanover Park co-op hockey won Haas Cup championships in 2000, 2004, 2005, 2011 (as co-champion), 2012, 2013 and 2016. In February 2016, Park hockey won the Haas Cup for the seventh time since 2000, beating Vernon Township High School by a score of 4–2 in a game played in front of 3,500 people at Mennen Arena.

The boys' track team won the 2004 Group I indoor relay championship

The 2004 girls' soccer team won the North II, Group I sectional championship with a 3–0 win against Lyndhurst High School in the tournament final. The 2004 team moved on to win the NJSIAA Group I state championship with a pair of shutout victories, defeating Butler High School 1–0 in the semifinals and Arthur P. Schalick High School 1–0 to win the championship.

In 2007, the boys' track team finished as co-champion in the North II Group I sectional finals for Spring Track. In 2008 the team was the North II Group I sectional champions. and the boys' Spring Track team was the North II Group I sectional champions.

Whippany Park's 2008 wrestling team went 16–5 in the season and won their first ever state sectional championship, beating county-ranked Parsippany High School and won the North Jersey Section II Group I sectional championship.

The baseball team won back-to-back conference championships (2009-2010), and won the North II Group I sectional championship in 2010 with a 6–5 win over High Tech High School. After winning the Group I semifinal against Emerson Junior-Senior High School, the team lost in the Group I state finals to Pitman High School 5–0, finishing the season with a record of 20–4.

The girls track team won the indoor track championship in Group I in 2016 (as co-champion).

Tom Wilson, a former Whippany Park High School soccer, basketball, and softball coach had more than 1,373 combined wins and is the holder of the Morris County record for girls basketball wins. He was featured in NJ.com's "The Top 99 New Jersey High School Coaches of All Time."

== Administration ==
The school's principal is Christopher N. Kelly. His core administration team includes two assistant principals.

== Notable alumni ==
- Rosemarie DeWitt (born 1971), actress
- Dan Frischman (born 1959, class of 1977), actor
- Brian Saxton (born 1972), tight end who played in the NFL for the New York Giants and Atlanta Falcons

== Notable faculty ==
- Joe Righetti (born 1947), former NFL defensive tackle who played two seasons with the Cleveland Browns.
