= Cedar Knolls, New Jersey =

Populated place in Morris County, New Jersey, US

- Census-designated place
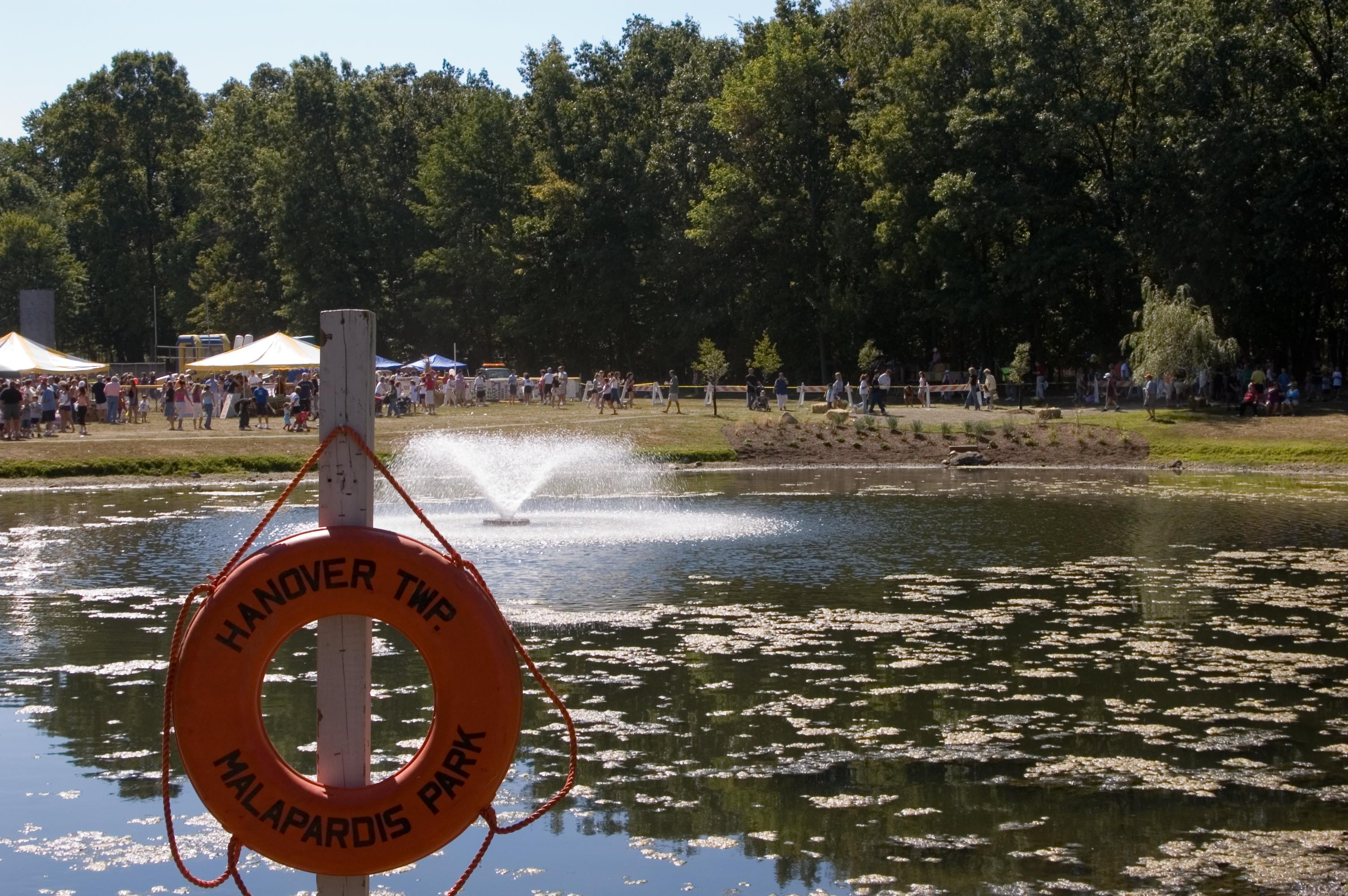
- Malapardis Park

- Location in Morris County Location in New Jersey Location in the United States
- Coordinates: 40°49′19″N 74°26′56″W
- Country: United States
- State: New Jersey
- County: Morris
- Township: Hanover

Area
  - Total: 2.09 sq mi (5.41 km^{2})
  - Land: 2.05 sq mi (5.32 km^{2})
  - Water: 0.035 sq mi (0.09 km^{2})
- Elevation: 364 ft (111 m)

Population (2020)
  - Total: 4,082
  - Density: 1,985/sq mi (766.6/km^{2})
- ZIP Code: 07927
- FIPS code: 34-11290
- GNIS feature ID: 2806060

Cedar Knolls is an unincorporated community located within Hanover Township in Morris County, in the U.S. state of New Jersey. It is part of Hanover Township along with Whippany.

It was first listed as a CDP in the 2020 census with a population of 4,082.

== Geography ==
Cedar Knolls is in eastern Morris County, in the western part of Hanover Township. It is bordered to the east by Whippany, to the south by Morris Township, and partially to the west by the borough of Morris Plains. Interstate 287 forms the eastern border of Cedar Knolls and leads southwest 3 miles (5 km) to Morristown, the county seat, and northeast the same distance to Parsippany.

According to the U.S. Census Bureau, the Cedar Knolls CDP has an area of 2.09 square miles (5.41 km^{2}), of which 2.06 square miles (5.34 km^{2}) are land and 0.03 square miles (0.08 km^{2}), or 1.58%, are water. The Whippany River flows through the southeast part of the community and is part of the Passaic River watershed.

== Demographics ==
Historical population
Census	Pop.	Note	%±
2020	4,082		—
U.S. Decennial Census 2020

Cedar Knolls first appeared as a census designated place in the 2020 U.S. census.

=== 2020 census ===
As of the 2020 census, Cedar Knolls had a population of 4,082. The median age was 43.8 years. 17.9% of residents were under the age of 18 and 20.1% of residents were 65 years of age or older. For every 100 females there were 92.9 males, and for every 100 females age 18 and over there were 89.6 males age 18 and over.

100.0% of residents lived in urban areas, while 0.0% lived in rural areas.

There were 1,665 households in Cedar Knolls, of which 26.4% had children under the age of 18 living in them. Of all households, 53.1% were married-couple households, 14.7% were households with a male householder and no spouse or partner present, and 26.8% were households with a female householder and no spouse or partner present. About 26.1% of all households were made up of individuals and 11.9% had someone living alone who was 65 years of age or older.

There were 1,737 housing units, of which 4.1% were vacant. The homeowner vacancy rate was 1.1% and the rental vacancy rate was 5.3%.

Cedar Knolls CDP, New Jersey – Racial and ethnic composition Note: the US Census treats Hispanic/Latino as an ethnic category. This table excludes Latinos from the racial categories and assigns them to a separate category. Hispanics/Latinos may be of any race.
Race / Ethnicity (NH = Non-Hispanic)	Pop 2020	% 2020
White alone (NH)	2,803	68.67%
Black or African American alone (NH)	192	4.70%
Native American or Alaska Native alone (NH)	3	0.07%
Asian alone (NH)	591	14.48%
Native Hawaiian or Pacific Islander alone (NH)	2	0.05%
Other race alone (NH)	9	0.22%
Mixed race or Multiracial (NH)	124	3.04%
Hispanic or Latino (any race)	358	8.77%
Total	4,082	100.00%
