= Morristown Municipal Airport =

Morristown Airport
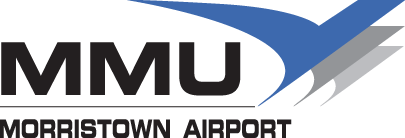

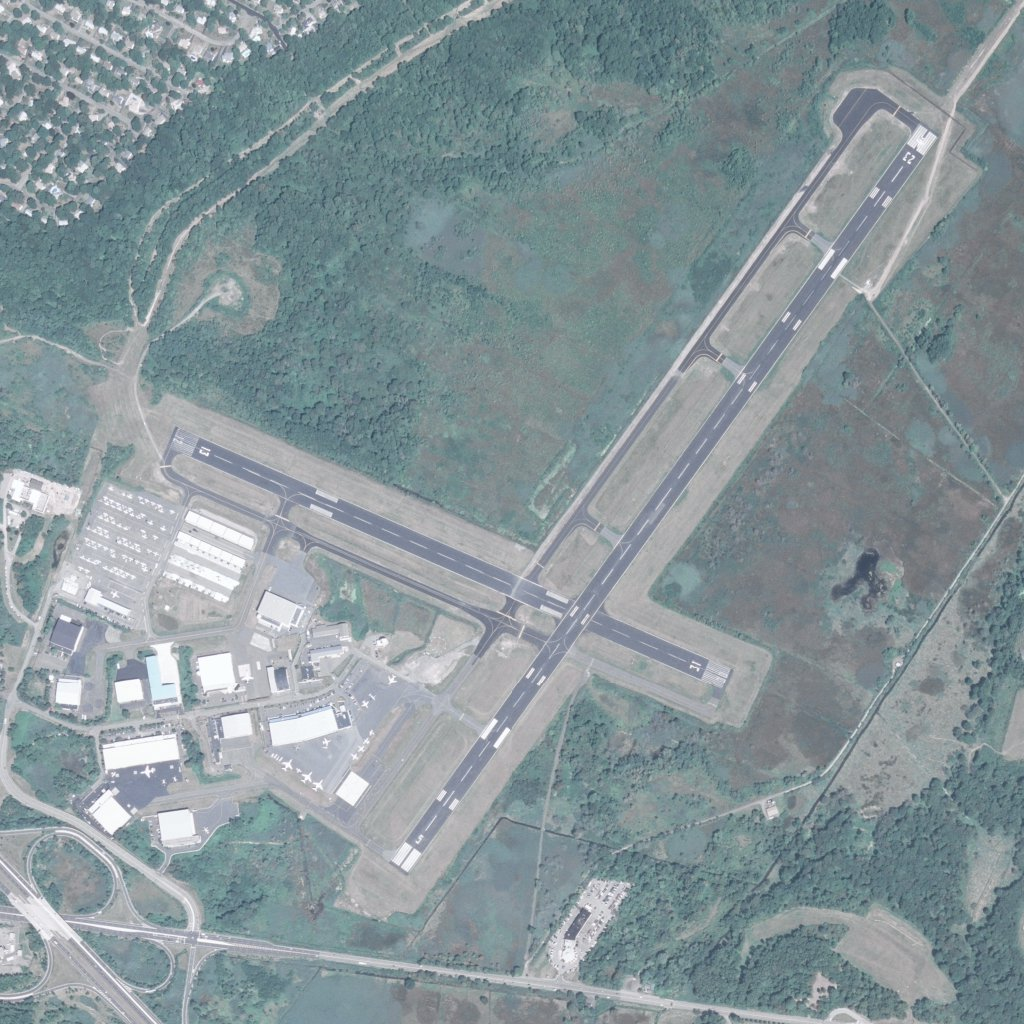
- USGS 2006 orthophoto
- IATA: MMU; ICAO: KMMU; FAA LID: MMU

Summary
- Airport type: Public
- Owner: Town of Morristown
- Serves: Morristown, New Jersey
- Location: Whippany, Morris County
- Elevation AMSL: 187 ft (57 m)
- Coordinates: 40°47′58″N 074°24′54″W
- Website: www.MMUair.com

Maps
- FAA airport diagram
- Interactive map of Morristown Airport

Runways
Direction	Length		Surface
Direction	ft	m	Surface
5/23	5,998	1,828	Asphalt
13/31	3,997	1,218	Asphalt

Statistics (2022)
- Aircraft operations (year ending 7/31/2022): 110,939
- Based aircraft (2022): 119
- Source: Federal Aviation Administration

Morristown Airport (IATA: MMU, ICAO: KMMU, FAA LID: MMU) is in Morris County, New Jersey, United States, three miles east of downtown Morristown and 40 miles west of Manhattan, New York City. Operated by DM AIRPORTS, LTD, it is in the Whippany section of Hanover. The National Plan of Integrated Airport Systems for 2011–2015 called it a general aviation reliever airport.

== History ==
In 1929, it was announced that Morristown, New Jersey would get an airport. The airport would sit on 280 acres of land on the Columbia Meadowlands which the town had acquired as part of the purchase of the Normandy & Whippany Water Company in 1931. Additional purchases brought the total tract size up to about 400 acres. The airport opened in the early 1930s, but due to the Great Depression, the activity at the field was relatively slow. In 1933, the Federal Government provided funds for a better airport. Midway through construction, the airport ran out of money.

Morristown Municipal Airport was considered for the eastern hub for the Zeppelin Company, Hugo Eckener visited the site in 1936 with Charles E. Rosendahl, but the Hindenburg Disaster the next year halted those plans.

During World War Two, Morristown served as a primary training center for the army. The Army became such an economic advantage to the airport that the airport made enough money to purchase and install hangars by the end of the War.

In 1947, the new hangars brought companies to the airport and the city of Morristown. The airport also created a significant population growth.

In 1956 the New Jersey Supreme Court ruled that Morristown Airport was not subject to the zoning laws of Hanover Township.

In 1969, Judge Joseph Stamler of New Jersey Superior Court issued a 1969 opinion in a case regarding noise from business jets operating at the airport, brought by residents and governments of surrounding municipalities, in which he set a curfew limiting takeoffs and landings during overnight hours. The judge said, "the giants of industry will see the wisdom of slowing the cross-country speed of their important executives, and will take a close, concerned look at the little people of this country" who were dealing with the impact of noise and ticket prices.

Like most of the United States at the time, the 1960-70s became the Jet Age at Morristown. For Morristown, this meant the expansion of the airport to accommodate jet aircraft. Morristown's airport expansion meant a significant extension to its main runway from 4000ft to 5998ft, a new, state-of-the-art control tower, and an instrument landing system (ILS). The airport became known as "the VIP stop." Commercial air traffic became a goal for the airport but was never reached.

In 2002, several hundred planes were based at the airport, making it one of the busiest General Aviation airports in the United States.

During his presidency, Donald Trump flew into the airport on an Air Force Boeing C-32 operating as Air Force One during his weekend visits and summer vacations at his home in Bedminster, New Jersey, which is about 24 miles southwest of the airport.*

=== Statistics ===
In the year ending July 31, 2022, the airport had 110,939 aircraft operations, an average of 304 per day: 88% general aviation, 12% air taxi, <1% military and <1% airline. At that time, there were 119 aircraft based at this airport: 48 single-engine, 12 multi-engine, 57 jet and 2 helicopter.

== Facilities ==
Morristown Airport covers 625 acres (253 ha) at an elevation of 187 feet (57 m).

=== Control Tower ===
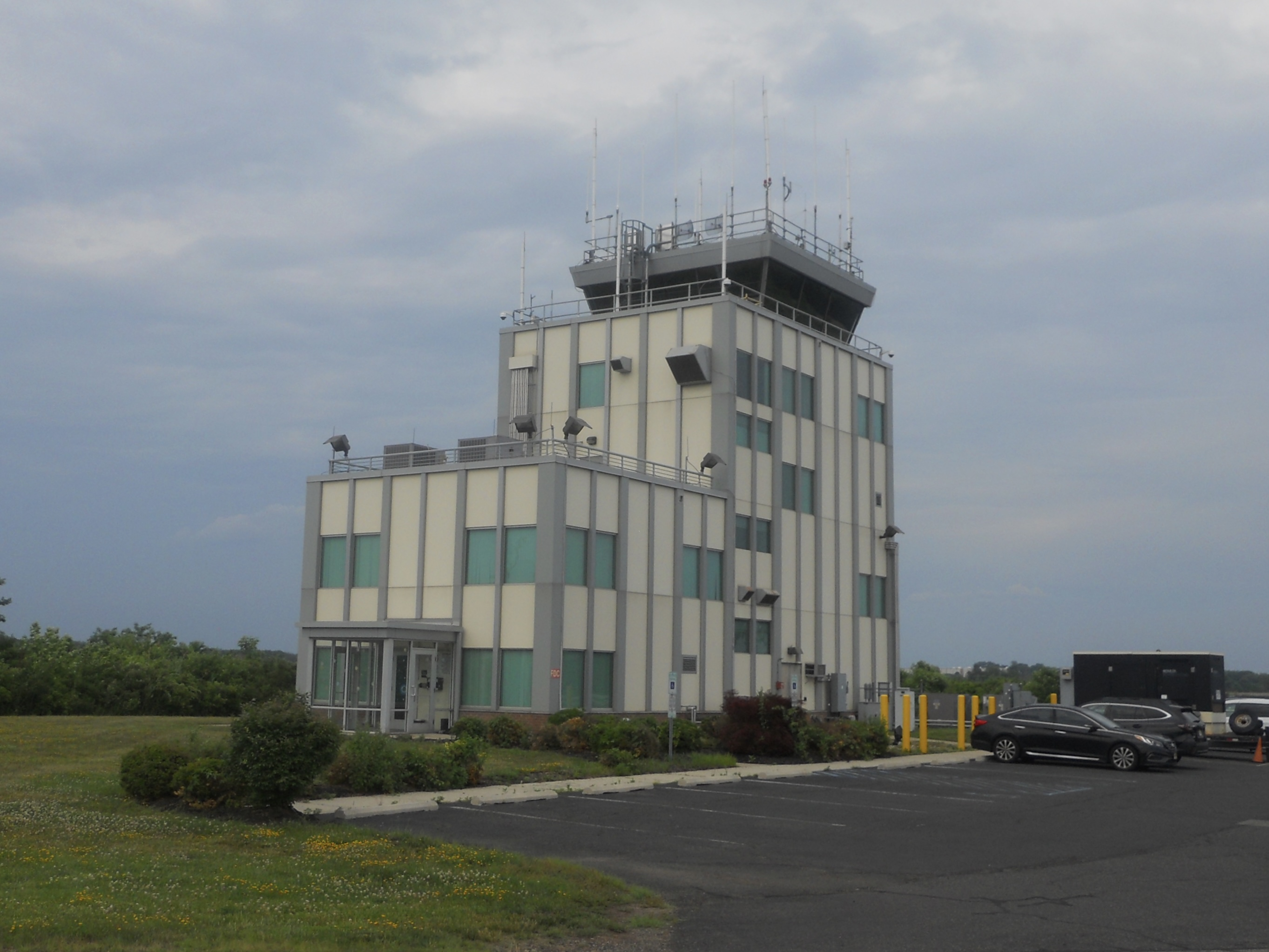
The air traffic control tower at Morristown Municipal Airport

The first control tower at the airport went up in 1950. The airport purchased the original, retired wooden tower from Teterboro Airport to control the field throughout the 1950s. However, after a rise in aircraft operations, the 1960s brought a new, modern tower to the field.

=== Runways ===
Runway 5/23 is 5,998 by 150 feet (1,828 by 46 m), with High Intensity Runway Lights (HIRL). Runway 23 has a ILS and LOC approach (Instrument Landing System), an RNAV RNP approach, and a GPS RNAV approach (Instrument Approach). Runway 23 also has a MALSR approach lighting system. Runway 5 has an GPS RNAV approach. Runway 5/23 is the preferred noise abatement runway for the airport.

Runway 13/31 is 3,997 by 150 feet (1,218 by 46 m), with Medium Intensity Runway Lights (MIRL). There are no instrument procedures for this runway.

=== FBOs ===
There are two fixed-base operators (FBOs): Atlantic Aviation and Signature Aviation.

Morristown Airport is home to multiple based jet charter operators available to the public. It has several flight schools on-site: American Flyers, ATP, Certified Flyers, Alpha Aviation and NOVA Aviation. Morristown Airport also has a customs facility.

== See also ==
- Transportation in New York City
- List of airports in New Jersey
