= Whippany, New Jersey =

Place in Morris County, New Jersey, United States

- Census-designated place
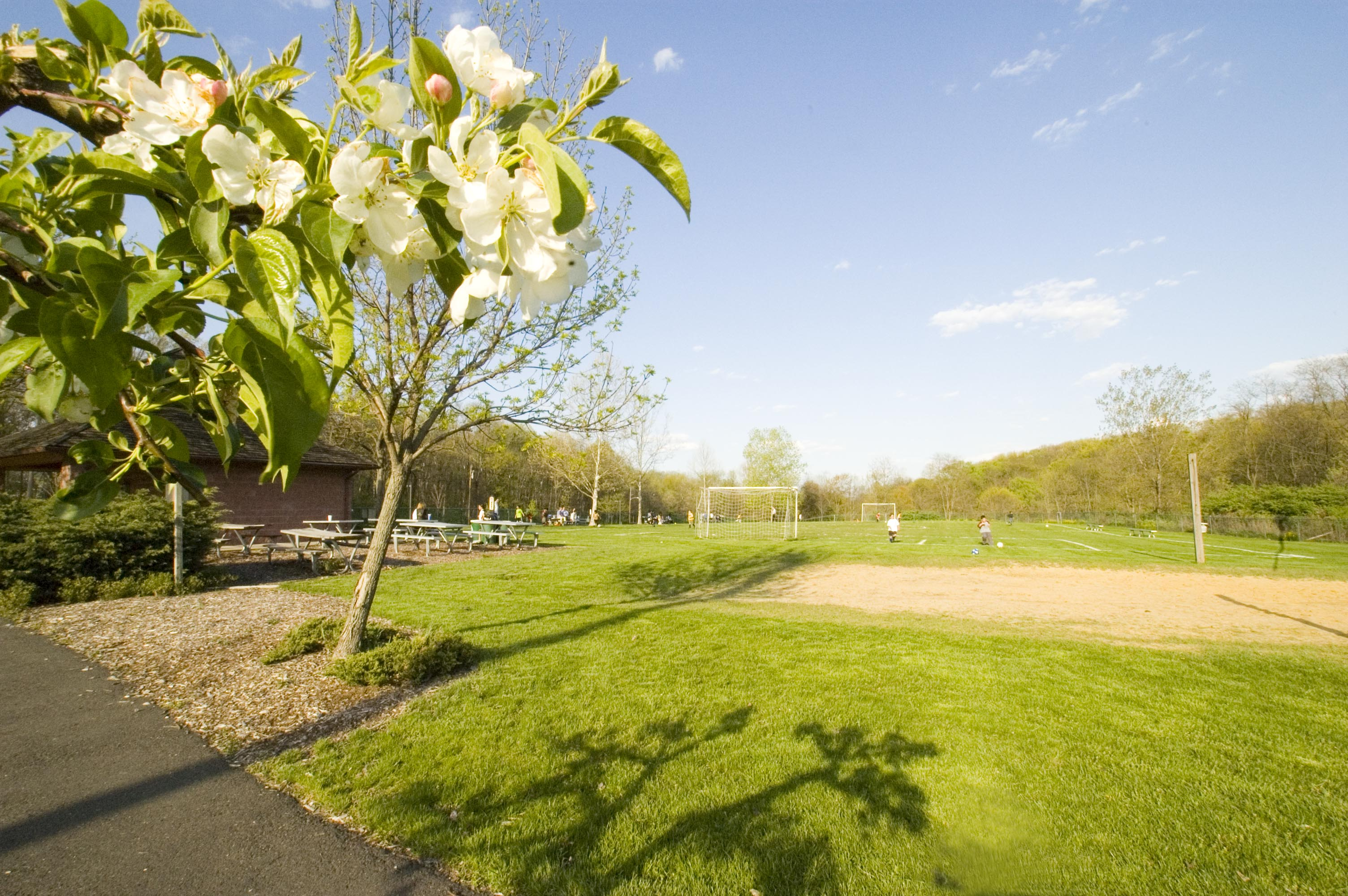
- Whippany's Central Park

- Location in Morris County Location in New Jersey Location in the United States
- Coordinates: 40°49′28″N 74°25′02″W
- Country: United States
- State: New Jersey
- County: Morris
- Township: Hanover

Area
  - Total: 5.74 sq mi (14.9 km^{2})
  - Land: 5.61 sq mi (14.5 km^{2})
  - Water: 0.13 sq mi (0.34 km^{2})
- Elevation: 233 ft (71 m)

Population (2020)
  - Total: 8,863
  - Density: 1,580.1/sq mi (610.1/km^{2})
- ZIP Code: 07981
- FIPS code: 34-80540
- GNIS feature ID: 0881770

Whippany (/hwɪpəni/ WHIP-ə-nee) is an unincorporated community and census-designated place (CDP) in Hanover Township, Morris County, New Jersey, United States. As of the 2020 census, it had a population of 8,863.

Whippany's name is derived from the Whippanong Native Americans, a tribe that once inhabited the area. Whippanong meant "place of the willows", named for the trees growing along the banks of the Whippany River.

== History ==
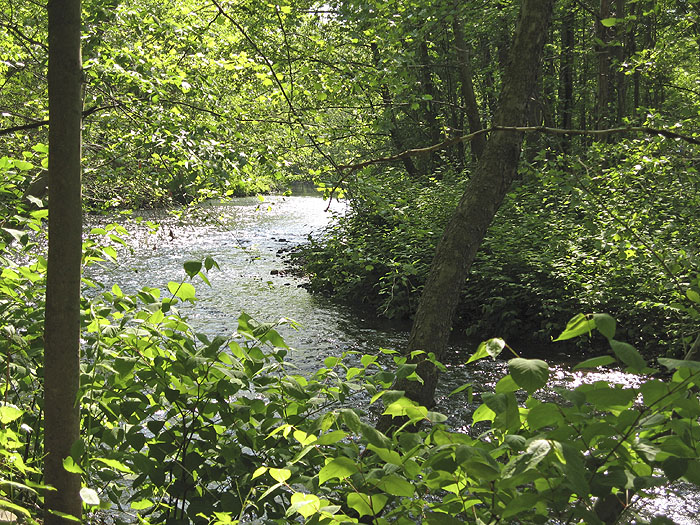
The Whippany River as seen from the Frelinghuysen Arboretum

The Whippany River is an important part of the Munsee, colonial, and industrial history of the town.

=== Munsee Lenape ===
Circa 1000 CE, the area, along with most of northern New Jersey, was inhabited by the Munsee Lenape people. Circa 1500, all of New Jersey was part of the Lenapehoking, the homelands of the Lenape.

The Munsee harvested mussels from the Whippany River. Arrowheads found in Munsee encampments throughout the nearby Washington Valley suggest that they hunted wolf, elk, and wild turkey for game.

=== Colonial settlement ===
The earliest European settlers to live along the Whippany River can be traced back to 1685. The river was an integral part of life in the area; it provided water power for the various mills which developed in the town.

During the American Revolutionary War, George Washington arrived in Whippany on June 25, 1780, after ordering Continental troops towards the North River following the Battle of Springfield.

=== Modern history ===
The Seeing Eye, the first guide dog school for the blind in the United States, was located in Whippany between 1931 and 1966, before moving to its current campus in nearby Morris Township.

== Geography ==
Whippany is in eastern Morris County and occupies most of the eastern part of Hanover Township. It is bordered to the west, across Interstate 287, by Cedar Knolls, also in Hanover Township. Whippany is bordered to the north by Parsippany–Troy Hills Township, to the east by East Hanover Township, to the south by the Black Meadows Preserve and Morristown Municipal Airport, and to the southwest by Morris Township, Morris Township. Morristown, the county seat, is 5 miles (8 km) to the southwest.

According to the U.S. Census Bureau, the Whippany CDP has a total area of 5.74 square miles (14.87 km^{2}), of which 5.61 square miles (14.53 km^{2}) are land and 0.13 square miles (0.34 km^{2}), or 2.21%, are water. The Whippany River flows through the center of town, leading northeast to join the Passaic River near Pine Brook. The river is protected by the Whippany River Watershed Action Committee.

== Demographics ==
Whippany first appeared as a census designated place in the 2020 U.S. census.

=== 2020 census ===
As of the 2020 census, Whippany had a population of 8,863. The median age was 48.2 years. 18.7% of residents were under the age of 18 and 22.5% were 65 years of age or older. For every 100 females there were 90.0 males, and for every 100 females age 18 and over there were 87.0 males.

100.0% of residents lived in urban areas, while 0.0% lived in rural areas.

There were 3,463 households in Whippany, of which 28.9% had children under the age of 18 living in them. Of all households, 56.9% were married-couple households, 12.5% were households with a male householder and no spouse or partner present, and 26.8% were households with a female householder and no spouse or partner present. About 26.8% of all households were made up of individuals and 14.9% had someone living alone who was 65 years of age or older.

There were 3,605 housing units, of which 3.9% were vacant. The homeowner vacancy rate was 0.7% and the rental vacancy rate was 9.3%.

Whippany CDP, New Jersey – Racial and ethnic composition Note: the US Census treats Hispanic/Latino as an ethnic category. This table excludes Latinos from the racial categories and assigns them to a separate category. Hispanics/Latinos may be of any race.
Race / Ethnicity (NH = Non-Hispanic)	Pop 2020	2020
White alone (NH)	6,748	76.14%
Black or African American alone (NH)	109	1.23%
Native American or Alaska Native alone (NH)	6	0.07%
Asian alone (NH)	1,220	13.77%
Native Hawaiian or Pacific Islander alone (NH)	0	0.00%
Other race alone (NH)	17	0.19%
Mixed race or Multiracial (NH)	236	2.66%
Hispanic or Latino (any race)	527	5.95%
Total	8,863	100.00%

=== Income and poverty ===
The median household income was $153,725 in the 2023 American Community Survey

== Education ==
Public schools in the area include Bee Meadow School, Mountview Road School, Salem Drive School, Memorial Junior School and Whippany Park High School.

Arrow Academy is a Christian school for grades PreK-8.

The Morris County Library is in Whippany.

== Sports ==
The New York Red Bulls U23, a development team for the New York Red Bulls, play at the team's 15-acre (6.1 ha) development facility in the township.

== Notable organizations ==
- J. E. Ashworth & Sons operated a woolen blanket mill in Whippany.
- Barclays relocated part of their Manhattan operations to Whippany in 2018.
- The Whippany Railway Museum is located in the central part of the community.
- Bayer HealthCare
- Communication Techniques, Inc. (CTI), a wholly owned subsidiarity of Herley Industries
- The New Jersey Jewish News, a weekly newspaper published by United Jewish Communities of MetroWest New Jersey
- CAE Inc. provides flight simulation and crew training services to the Business Aviation community.
- The Ukrainian American Cultural Center of New Jersey is in Whippany.
- Physicians' Desk Reference

== Notable people ==
People who were born in, residents of, or otherwise closely associated with Whippany include:

- Adlan Amagov (born 1986), Strikeforce fighter
- Sal Canzonieri, guitarist and founding member of the band Electric Frankenstein
- Damon Daunno (born 1984), actor who starred in the 2019 Broadway revival of Oklahoma!
- Dan Frischman (born 1959), character actor, noted for his many roles as "geek" or "nerd" characters
- Dan Miller (born 1981), UFC fighter
- Brian Saxton (born 1972), tight end who played for the New York Giants
- Linda Tripp (1949-2020), former U.S. civil servant who figured in the Monica Lewinsky scandal involving former U.S. President Bill Clinton
