= Geraldine Rockefeller Dodge =

American heiress and arts patron (1882–1973)

- Portrait of Geraldine Rockefeller in 1906 by Friedrich August von Kaulbach - Dodge Room in the Morris Museum
- Born: Ethel Geraldine Rockefeller; April 3, 1882; New York City, New York, U.S.
- Died: August 13, 1973 (aged 91); Madison, New Jersey, U.S.
- Occupation: Philanthropist
- Spouse: Marcellus Hartley Dodge Sr.
- Children: Marcellus Hartley Dodge Jr.
- Parent(s): William Avery Rockefeller Jr. Almira Geraldine Goodsell

Ethel Geraldine Rockefeller Dodge (April 3, 1882 – August 13, 1973) was an American heiress and art patron. She was the youngest child of William Avery Rockefeller Jr. and Almira Geraldine (Goodsell) Rockefeller and was known by her second name, Geraldine. Giralda Farms was the name given to the New Jersey country estate where she lived after marrying. She was a highly respected expert on dogs and a great patron of the arts. Parts of her collection became the object of a lawsuit following her death.

== Life ==
Geraldine Rockefeller was born in New York City, New York on April 3, 1882, to Almira Geraldine Goodsell and William Rockefeller She grew up at Rockwood Hall, her father's estate in Mount Pleasant, New York.

She married Marcellus Hartley Dodge Sr., president of The Remington Arms Company and, she brought into the marriage an estimated personal fortune of $101 million. They were married on April 18, 1907, in Manhattan, where both resided, in a small ceremony at the residence of the bride's family, following the contemporary customs dictated by a mourning period after the death of the groom's father in February.

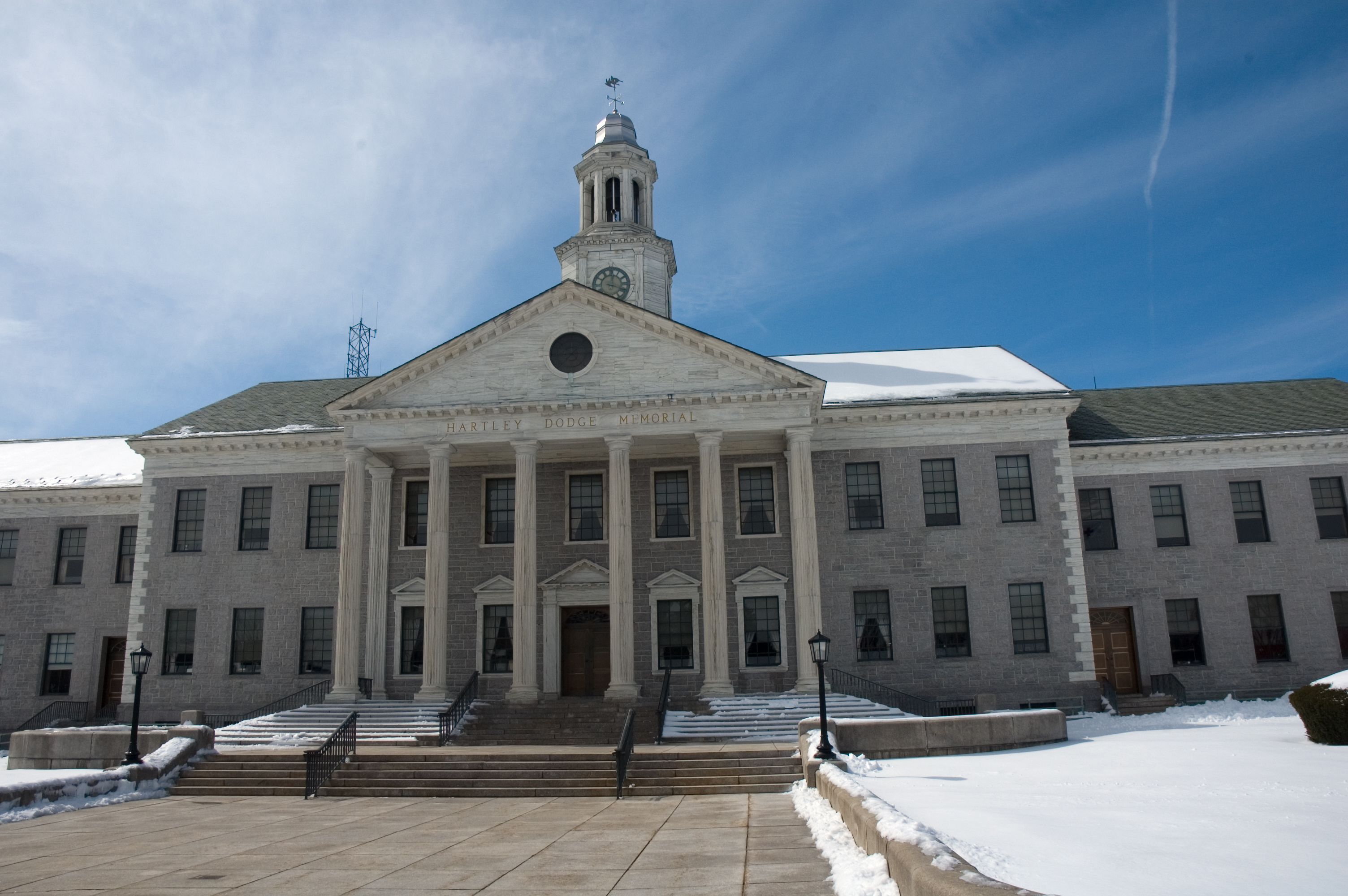
Hartley Dodge Memorial Building in Madison, NJ

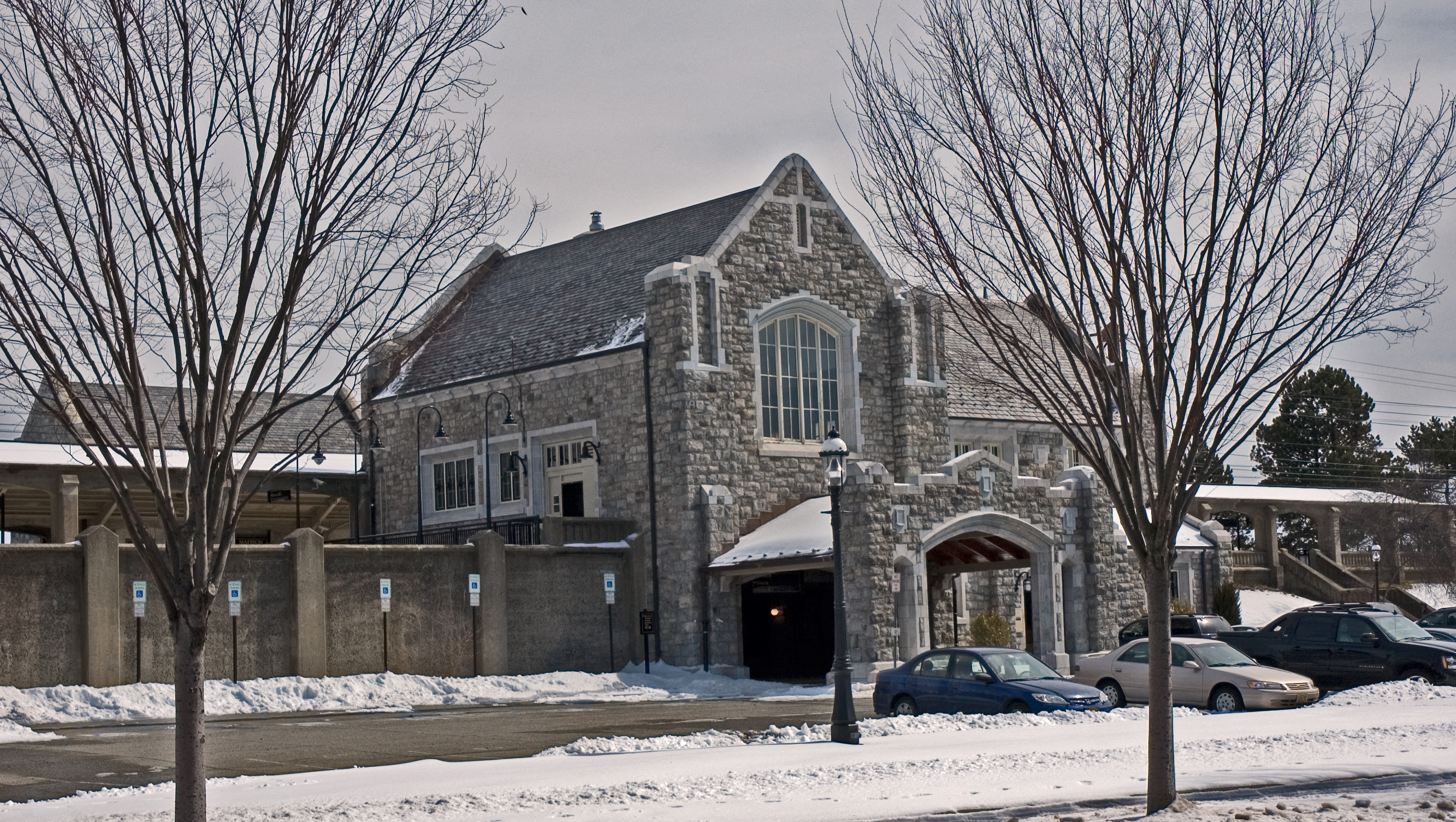
Madison Train Station

The couple had only one child, Marcellus Hartley Dodge Jr., whom they called "Hartley". He was killed in an automobile accident on August 29, 1930, in Mogesca, France. In his memory, his mother purchased a large parcel of land for twenty thousand dollars and gave Madison, New Jersey, the property and the Hartley Dodge Memorial Building which was dedicated on Memorial Day, Thursday, May 30, 1935, and used as the borough hall. The New York Times published that the building cost $800,000. Mrs. Dodge also donated the train station. These structures became the core of the Madison Civic Commercial District, which is listed on the State Register of Historic Places and the National Register of Historic Places. They made many other significant donations in his name.

She died in 1973, and was buried in Sleepy Hollow Cemetery next to her son, at the foot of the mausoleum of her father, William Rockefeller Jr.

== Estate ==
During the early part of their marriage they resided together at Hartley Farms in New Jersey. Eventually, while in New Jersey, they resided on separate, but abutting, country estates: Giralda Farms and Hartley Farms. Her estate, Giralda Farms, fronted the main route from Madison to Morristown opposite a property his family owned and extending to another of his that faced south and fronted on Spring Valley Road in New Vernon, where he preferred to reside. A long private path extended for miles between the houses on the adjacent properties with gates at either side of Woodland Road, which defined the southern boundary of her property.

Giralda Farms was located in Madison, New Jersey. Originally belonging to the Daniel Willis James family, the Dodges bought the then 240-acre estate in 1911. The mansion for the estate was built in 1893 and had been built in the Spanish Gothic style. By 1920 it had grown to 550-acres. She also maintained a home on 5th Avenue in New York.

After Geraldine R. Dodge's death in 1973, the estate became a corporate park. The mansion was razed in May 1976. In 1978, nearly all the remaining estate buildings on the estate were demolished.

== Dogs and Philanthropy ==
Geraldine R. Dodge judged at major dog shows in every American state as well as the premier shows in Germany, Canada, Ireland, and England. She was the first woman invited to judge for the Westminster Kennel Club, where she was invited to judge the Best in Show.

She was the author of two books, The English Cocker Spaniel in America, and The German Shepherd Dog in America, the latter of which was a collaboration with her curator of art, Josephine Z. Rine.

She was recognized as a philanthropist, a benefactor to communities, the arts, nonprofit and natural resource efforts, as an author, a judge of dogs, a breeder of dogs, the founder of the Morris and Essex Dog Club and its internationally recognized annual exhibition in May that was considered the most prestigious dog show held in the United States of America for decades, and the founder of St. Hubert's Giralda, a refuge for injured and lost animals. St. Hubert's Giralda, now known as St. Hubert's Animal Welfare Center, founded in 1939, still operates on the grounds of Dodge's former Giralda Farms estate in Madison, New Jersey.

She was a significant sponsor for American sculptor Cyrus Dallin who visited Hartley Farms several times with his wife. When Mrs. Dodge's significant art collection was posthumously auctioned, it included 20 bronze Dallin sculptures including Passing of the Buffalo or The Last Arrow. In 1975 this sculpture sold for $150,000 a record for a piece of American Sculpture at the time.

== Legacy ==
At her death she left $85 million to establish the Geraldine R. Dodge Foundation, which continues her work, including the Geraldine R. Dodge Poetry Festival.

=== Great Swamp ===
Mr. Dodge's property extended to the edge of the Great Swamp that is a remnant from the Glacial Lake Passaic. His property has been preserved through a conservation easement and is listed on the National Register of Historic Places.

They were instrumental in helping those in the Jersey Jetport Site Association, which began the campaign to save that vast swamp from development as an airport, by providing funds for the initial purchases of core properties in 1959. Acquisition of a significant area of land was required for it to qualify as a large enough gift to the federal government that could be set aside, forever, as a federal park.

Her husband was one of the first trustees of the North American Wildlife Foundation that completed the acquisition. Legislation championed by then congressman Stewart L. Udall was passed on November 3, 1960, protecting the important natural resource. In 1964 the park was dedicated by Udall, who had become Secretary of the Interior to president John F. Kennedy and continued under Lyndon B. Johnson. The Great Swamp National Wildlife Refuge was dedicated in 1968 and named the M. Hartley Dodge Wildlife Refuge.
