= Madison Civic Commercial District =

Historic district in New Jersey, United States

- U.S. National Register of Historic Places
- U.S. Historic district
- New Jersey Register of Historic Places
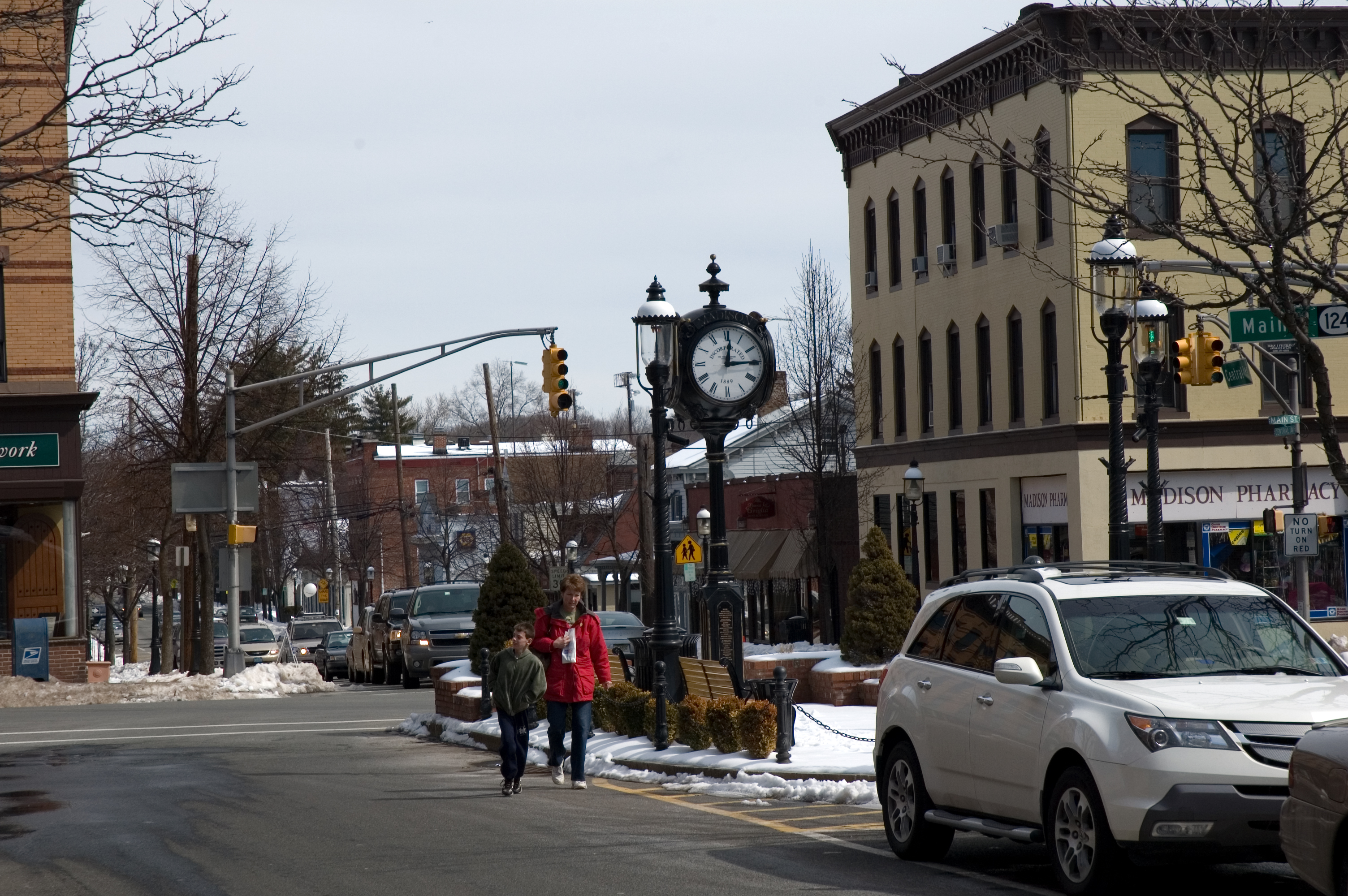
- Main Street, 2007

- Location within Morris County, New Jersey
- Location: Madison, NJ
- Nearest city: Summit
- Coordinates: 40°45′29″N 74°24′56″W
- Area: 49 acres (20 ha)
- Built: Late 19th–mid-20th centuries
- Architect: multiple
- Architectural style: Various contemporary styles
- NRHP reference No.: 89002115
- NJRHP No.: 2139

Significant dates
- Added to NRHP: October 18, 1991
- Designated NJRHP: October 9, 1979

The Madison Civic Commercial District is a 49-acre (20 ha) area of downtown Madison, Morris County, New Jersey, United States. It includes 450 buildings and one structure in an area roughly bounded by Main Street (NJ 124), Kings Road, Green Avenue, Waverly Place, Lincoln Place and Prospect Street.

It had been the historic core of Madison starting in the late 19th century. In 1930 its most significant property, the Hartley Dodge Memorial Building that currently serves as Madison's borough hall, was donated by local landowner Geraldine Rockefeller Dodge in memory of her son Marcellus, who had died at age 22. It was added to the National Register of Historic Places in 1991.

== See also ==
- National Register of Historic Places listings in Morris County, New Jersey
