= Marcellus Hartley Dodge Sr. =

American CEO and philanthropist (1881–1963)

- Born: Marcellus Hartley Dodge; February 28, 1881; New Jersey, US
- Died: December 25, 1963 (aged 82); Giralda Farms, New Jersey, US
- Education: Columbia University (BA)
- Occupations: Owner and chairman of the Remington Arms Company
- Spouse: Geraldine Rockefeller Dodge
- Children: Marcellus Hartley Dodge Jr.

Marcellus Hartley Dodge Sr. (February 28, 1881 – December 25, 1963) was an American CEO and philanthropist. He was the chairman of the board of Remington Arms Company and a member of the family associated with the Phelps Dodge Corporation. He was the president or director of several companies and the president of YMCA in the United States. He was a well-known philanthropist with significant donations to many institutions and organizations and he was a major contributor to the successful efforts to protect the Great Swamp.

== Biography ==
Dodge was born on February 28, 1881, to Emma Hartley, who died from complication of childbirth on March 3, 1881, and Norman White Dodge.

His paternal grandfather was William E. Dodge Sr., an abolitionist, but also a partner at Phelps, Dodge, a company that exported cotton from the deep south to Liverpool, England. Phelps, Dodge was also in the business of importing copper from England and diversified into mining and smelting. He was a promoter of the rights of Native Americans who served as the president of the National Temperance Society from 1865 to 1883, represented the New York 8th congressional district in the United States Congress for a portion of the 39th United States Congress in 1866-67, and was a founding member of YMCA in the United States. He had married Melissa Phelps (1809-1903), the daughter of Anson Greene Phelps and Olivia Egleston and in 1833, William E. Dodge and his father-in-law founded the mining firm Phelps, Dodge, and Company, one of America's foremost mining companies.

His maternal grandfather was Marcellus Hartley, a merchant and financier of Manhattan. His grandfather had provided a home on Thirty-seventh Street adjoining his on Madison Avenue for his daughter, Emma, as a wedding present when she had married Norman W. Dodge on May 6, 1880. Emma died on March 3, 1881, a few days after the birth of her son. Several years after the death of his mother, his father remarried on January 5, 1897, and Marcellus was raised by his maternal grandparents. Marcellus Hartley died in 1902 and left his grandson as heir to $60 million (approximately $2,232,692,000 today) at the age of twenty-one, while he was attending Columbia University and living with his grandmother, Frances Chester Hartley, at 282 Madison Avenue in Manhattan.

=== Education and early adulthood ===
In 1903, Dodge was graduated from Columbia University, where he was president of his class, manager of the track team, and coxswain of his class crew (sometimes referred to as college rowing).

Upon his graduation, he and his maternal aunt, Helen Hartley Jenkins (Mrs. George W. Jenkins), presented the Hartley Hall dormitory to Columbia. The building became Columbia's largest dormitory and created more of a college atmosphere for the new campus in Morningside Heights.

The Orinoco watershed, the Orinoquia - an area of South America visited on the yacht Wakiva I in 1906 by Marcellus Dodge and a party of friends

Well known in society and an avid yachtsman, on July 11, 1906, Dodge took a party of his friends on the Wakiva I, his large pleasure and cruising yacht, on a month-long tour to the upper waters of the Amazon River, the Orinoco in Venezuela and Colombia, the Guianas: British Guiana, Surinam, and French Guiana. They visited many locations in the Caribbean, including Cuba where they toured the battle fields of recent armed rebellion before returning to Tampa. His guests included Nicholas Crosby, international law authority John Bassett Moore, historian H. A. Cushing, Everitt Dominick, Eugene Delano Jr., cartographer and historian William Robert Shepherd, J. R. Thompson, and Dr. James R. Cannon. Photographs and some remembrances of the trip by Eugene Delano were published in the Yale Courant, Volume 43 May 1907, pages 686–693, under the title, Les Iles du Salut.

=== Marriage ===
In 1907, Dodge became engaged and married to (Ethel) Geraldine Rockefeller of 689 Fifth Avenue. She was a child of William and Almira Geraldine Goodsell Rockefeller, and was estimated to have her own fortune of more than 100 million dollars. They were said to be the wealthiest newlyweds in the country when they married. Initially, when they resided in New Jersey, they lived together at Hartley Farms, a country estate in New Vernon purchased by Marcellus and his aunt, Helen Hartley Jenkins, in 1904.

Soon, they bought all of the land between two estates held by his family in Morris County, New Jersey, that lay between Spring Valley Road in the community of New Vernon and Madison Avenue in Madison. Most of the area is part of the Harding Township area that extends from Chatham to Morristown. The last portion purchased, that had belonged to Charles W. Harkness, the third largest stockholder of Standard Oil shares, named Giralda Farms, was purchased by Geraldine in 1923. She maintained it as a grand country estate among the rolling hills.

Eventually, they resided separately on the adjoining estates. He preferred the New Jersey setting and maintained his residence in New Vernon throughout his life, but his wife regularly stayed in her Manhattan residence for two or three days each week.

Dodge expanded the house at "Hartley Farms", which initially had been used as a country retreat associated with his family's charitable organization, "Hartley House" in Manhattan. After it became his residence, he added two wings and some interior enhancements to the house as well as secondary living quarters, barns, stables, and a polo field. The property has been preserved with a conservation easement and his residence has been listed on the National Register of Historic Places. At one time Hartley Farms extended for a thousand acres (4 km^{2}).

They had one child, Marcellus Hartley Dodge Jr., who died in an automobile crash in Mogesca, France in 1930. His mother built an extensive memorial to him as a civic center in Madison along with the train station she built opposite the center. They also donated a structure on the campus of Princeton University, from which their son had been graduated shortly before his death.

At the time of his marriage, Dodge was the president and a director of the Union Metallic Cartridge Company, president of the Bridgeport Gun Implement Company, director of the Equitable Trust Company, director of International Banking Company, director of M. Hartley Company, a member of the Lawyers Club of New York City, the Essex County Country Club, and the City of New York Club.

An accomplished equestrian, Dodge also founded the Spring Valley Hounds, a hunt club that not only conducted hunts for their members among the many estates nearby, but also held a major annual horse show in New Jersey. Competitions included those for hunters and open jumpers, as well as for saddle horses of three and five gaits. Many of the competitors followed the international horse show circuit that closed its season with the November exhibition at Madison Square Garden on Fiftieth Street and Eighth Avenue in Manhattan each year. Nearby, the United States Equestrian Team formed for the Olympics from these ranks in 1950, it was founded just off of Spring Valley Road, on van Beuren Road at the Coates estate.

=== Remington Arms Company ===
Eventually, Dodge became the chairman of Remington Arms Company, taking the place of his maternal grandfather. The Remington Arms and Union Metallic Cartridge factories at Bridgeport, Connecticut were described as the greatest small arms and ammunition plant in the world by the editor of the New York Times in 1916. Cash control of the company was acquired by DuPont in 1933, but Dodge remained at the head of the business.

Following the business tradition established by his grandfather at the time of the American Civil War, his company was the supplier of sixty-nine percent of the arms, ammunition, and munitions being used by the federal government during the Second World War. Secret meetings about this were held on his country estate, Hartley Farms, at his polo fields which, except for the war years, were also used from 1927 as the site of the exhibition of the Morris and Essex Dog Show held by his wife, Geraldine. During these meetings General Dwight D. Eisenhower and he became close friends.

=== Columbia University board of directors ===
He was a member of the board of trustees of Columbia University, his alma mater and made many donations to the university. He was the founder of the Marcellus Hartley Dodge Cup that is awarded in crew. The Marcellus Hartley Dodge Award is bestowed in his honor. A bronze plaque dedicated to Dodge and bearing his likeness is displayed at the university.

=== Champion of the Great Swamp ===
When the remnants of Glacial Lake Passaic, the Great Swamp that abutted Dodge's estate, was targeted for development as an airport by the Port Authority of New York and New Jersey, nearby citizens formed the Jersey Jetport Site Association in 1959 to protect it by purchasing properties to assemble for donation to the government as a federal park. Dodge, being close to the area and fiscally capable, joined their efforts.

Dodge was one of the first trustees of the North American Wildlife Foundation that completed the acquisition of enough of the Great Swamp to protect the massive natural resource. Legislation was introduced that was championed by Stewart L. Udall while he was a congressman from Arizona. It was passed on November 3, 1960, protecting the important natural resource. In 1964 the park was dedicated by Udall, who had become Secretary of the Interior to president John F. Kennedy and continued in the same role under Lyndon B. Johnson.

The Great Swamp National Wildlife Refuge was dedicated in 1968. It was named the M. Hartley Dodge Wildlife Refuge, in honor of his son.

=== Death ===
Dodge died on Christmas Day, December 25, 1963, at Giralda Farms in Madison, New Jersey.

== Legacy ==
In The New York Times, Dodge was described as an outstanding citizen, remembered above all for the warmth and generosity of his personality. He was a well-known philanthropist. Beginning with a donation of fountains on the plaza before Low Memorial Library and a residence building for students in 1903, Hartley Hall, that he and his aunt, Helen Hartley Jenkins, donated, he provided many gifts to Columbia University , and numerous other institutions and organizations. After his death his family and estate underwrote the construction of Dodge Physical Fitness Center at Columbia, and the university renamed another of its buildings Dodge Hall in his honor.
