= GSWA =

GSWA may refer to:

- Geological Survey of Western Australia, a department of the Government of Western Australia
- German South West Africa, former German colony, now Namibia
- Great Swamp Watershed Association, conservation organisation in New Jersey, United States
- Group for a Switzerland without an army, Swiss campaign against militarism in Switzerland
