= Troy Meadows =

Nature preserve in Parsippany, New Jersey

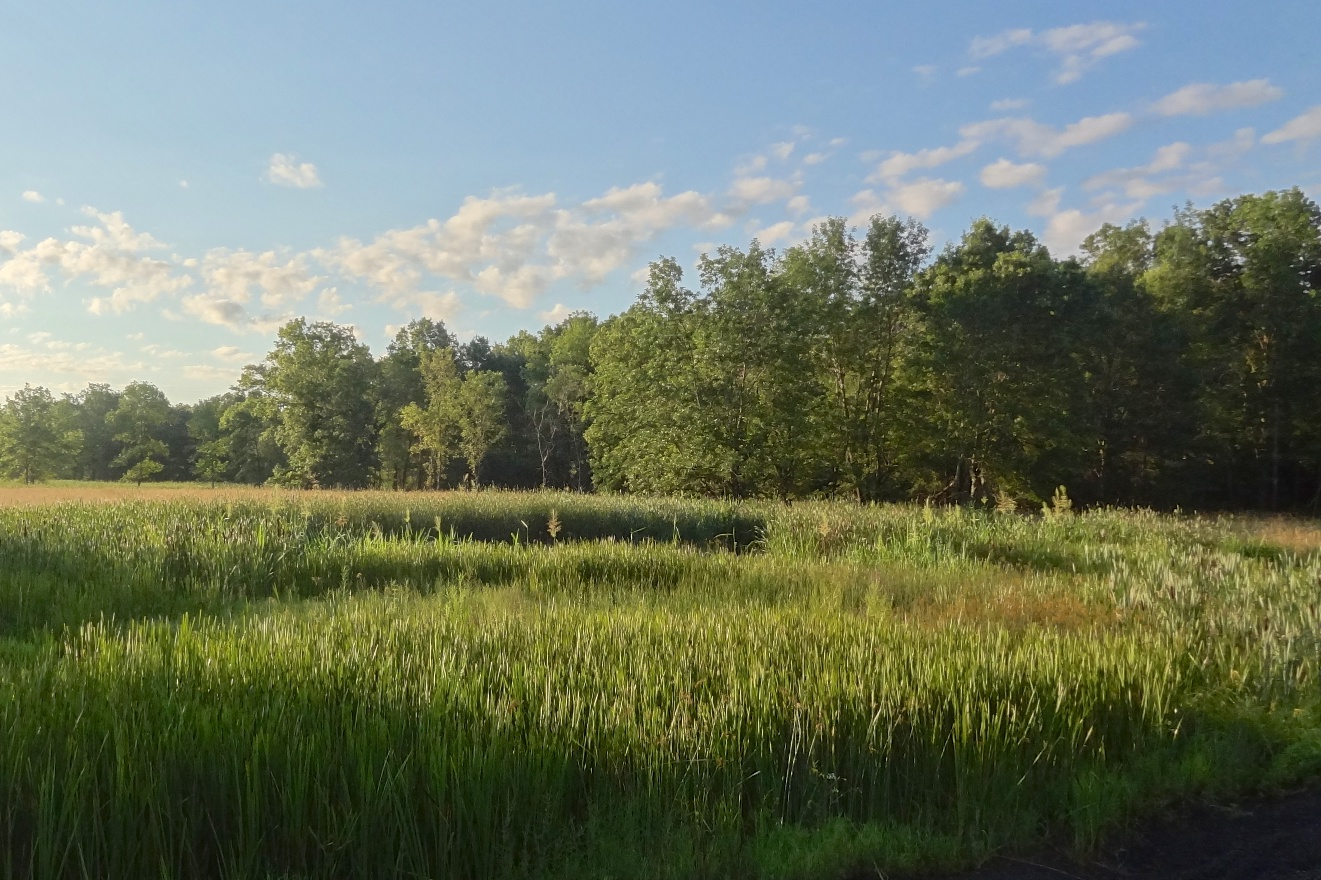

- Location within Morris County, New Jersey
- Location: Morris County, New Jersey
- Nearest city: Parsippany
- Coordinates: 40.84603°N 74.37928°W
- Area: 3,100 acres (1,300 ha)

U.S. National Natural Landmark
- Designated: 1967

Troy Meadows is a 3,100-acre (1,300 ha) nature preserve in Parsippany, Morris County, New Jersey. Along with the Great Swamp, it is one of the remnants of Glacial Lake Passaic. It was designated a National Natural Landmark in 1967. It is the largest freshwater marsh in New Jersey, the Whippany River goes through the swamp before connecting with the Rockaway River. It is part of the Northeastern coastal forests ecoregion.

== Geology ==
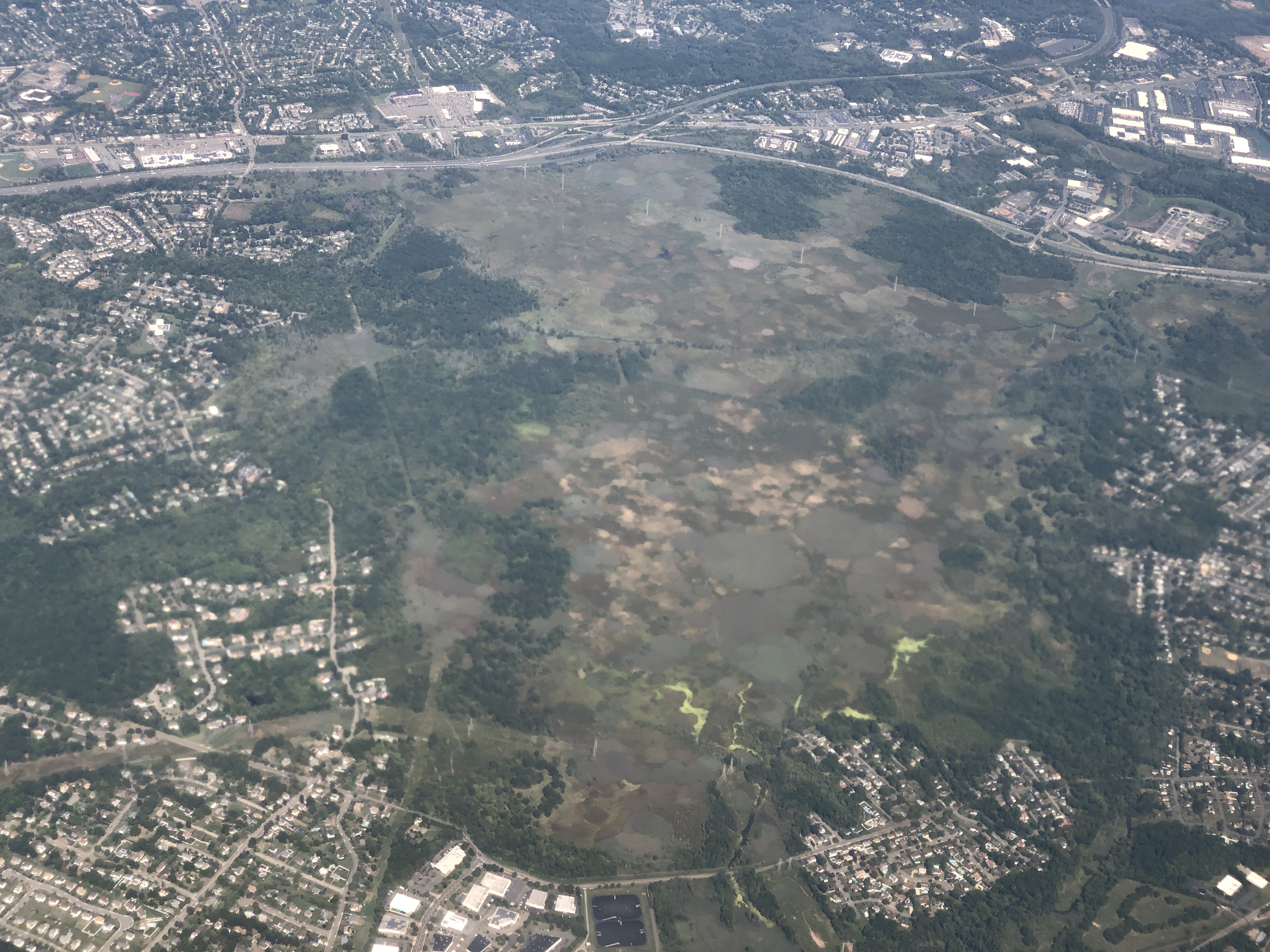
Aerial view

Around 400 million years ago, a small continent long and narrow collided with proto North America. This created folding and faulting, as compression occurred. Then around 350 million years ago, the African plate collided with North America creating the folding and faulting in the Appalachians. But when the African plate pulled away from North America, an aborted rift valley was created. This half graben, starts east of Boonton and goes through the middle of Parsippany, south to Morristown, to the south end of Great Swamp. From Parsippany and the Boonton area the half graben goes east to the western side of Paterson, were there was another fault by the lava flows. East of the Ramapo Fault is where there is this aborted rift valley.[19] The Ramapo fault goes through the county on a northeast–southwest axis. The fault separates the Highlands from the Piedmont, also known as the Newark Basin.

The Wisconsin Glacier covered the area from 25,000 B.C. to 13,000 B.C. and when it melted due to climate warming, Glacial Lake Passaic was created. The lake slowly drained and the meadows was created.

== Ownership ==
The marsh is owned by Wildlife Preserves and the State of New Jersey. Inside the marsh, there is a two mile boardwalk. There is also a trail network that provides public access for birdwatching, wildlife observation, and photography.
