= Lee Meadows Swamp =

Coordinates: 40.8401°N 74.4454°W

The Lee Meadows Swamp is a swamp that originally covered 500-acre (2.0 km^{2}) with low woodlands surrounding it. It is located in the southeastern section of Parsippany-Troy Hills Township and the western section of Hanover Township, in Morris County, New Jersey, United States. Due to the construction of office buildings and roads in the 1980s, the swamp has been reduced in size.

== Geology ==
During the late Triassic and early Jurassic periods, when the North American plate separated from the African plate, an aborted rift system was created. The resulting rift valley, known as the Newark Basin, was filled with alternating layers of red bed sediment and flood basalts. Over millions of years, the rift valley was faulted, tilted, and eroded, until the edges of the hard flood basalt layers formed ridges. Prior to 20,000 years before the present, an ancestral Passaic River flowed through a gap in these ridges. This changed when the Wisconsin Glacier, a massive continental ice sheet which formed during the last ice age, advanced on the region and permanently plugged the gap with glacial rubble. As the glacier eventually melted back, water pooled behind the ridges (known today as the Watchung Mountains), forming Glacial Lake Passaic. After thousands of years, the lake drained leaving behind many swamps, including Lee Meadows.

== Geography ==
The swamp is fed by three small streams. The first exits Mirror Pond, flowing through a low lying woodland. The second stream exits a pond on the western side of U.S. Route 202 and once flowed through open fields but now flows through an office building complex. The two streams meet and this is where the woodland swamp starts. The third stream starts near the intersection of Route 10 and U.S. Route 202, on the north side of Route 10, and flows east toward Interstate 287.

The elevation of the swamp area ranges from 280 to 320 feet (85 to 98 m) above sea level.

Route 287 was built in the early 1970s which cut through the eastern section of the swamp. On the south side of the swamp is Route 10.

The western side was used as the Alderney Dairy Farm from the 1940s to the late 1960s. It had three barns in the fields near the western side of the swamp.

== Flora and fauna ==
This swamp is feed by three small streams and because of this the water table did not rise much. Due to the water table not rising, animals were able to establish themselves in the swamp and surrounding area. The area had fields, corn fields, and deciduous forests around the swamp. This is why the area was once full of game. The area is inhabited by white tailed deer, gray fox, muskrats, raccoons, skunks, possums and weasels.

There are different types of hawks. Waterfowl such as mallards, wood ducks, woodcock migrated through the area in the autumn and rested in the swamp.

There were many types of snakes and turtles that lived in the area before the office complex was built. Garter snakes, brown snakes, ringneck snakes, water snakes, and milk snakes inhabited the area. Turtles included snapping turtles, box turtles, wood turtles, spotted turtles, musk and mud turtles.

The swamp is surrounded by a northern deciduous forest of maples, various oaks, beech, hickory, elm, ash, sweet gum, cherry, sycamore, and walnut.
