= Serbian National Defense Council =

Serb diaspora activist organization

Serbian National Defense Council (SND)
- Serbian National Defense Council logo
- Formation: 1914
- Type: Serbian nationalism Pan-Serbism; Anti-Globalism; Anti-Communism; Monarchism
- Headquarters: Chicago, Hamilton, Sydney
- Key people: Mihajlo Pupin; Jovan Dučić; Momčilo Đujić; Nikola Kavaja; Dragiša Kašiković
- Website: www.snd-us.com

The Serbian National Defense Council (SND) (Serbian Cyrillic: Српска народна одбрана) is a Serb diaspora community organization whose goal is to protect Serbs, the Serbian Orthodox Church and Serbian interests abroad. It is based in Chicago (United States), and also has chapters in Hamilton (Canada) and Sydney (Australia).

== History ==
=== Establishment and the World War I ===
Serbian National Defense Council (SND) was founded as Српска народна одбрана (Srpska narodna odbrana) by Michael Pupin in 1914 in New York City, USA, in midst of anti-Serb tensions leading up to the First World War. Soon after being founded, more than 263 branches sprung up across the United States and Canada and began aiding in the war effort at a time when America had yet to enter the conflict.

The Headquarters of the Serbian National Defense Council was at 443 West 22nd Street in New York. Michael Pupin was the founder and its first president. Andrija Sremac, brother of the late writer Stevan Sremac, was the council's 1st vice-president and Mita Bežanov was the 2nd vice-president; the treasurer was Tom Srzentić and the secretary was Vid Vuić (from 29 July 1914 to 22 May 1916) and Jovan Ekerović (from 22 May 1916 to 30 September 1917). Members of the Supervisory Board were Milan Milosavljević, Dragan Milićević and Pavle Hadzi Pavlović. Honorary members of the Serbian National Defense Council were Mrs. Helen Hartley Jenkins and Mrs. Helen Losanitch Frothingham.

From 1914 to 1917 SND raised roughly half a million dollars for Serbs in the Balkans, and recruited 17,000 American Serb volunteers to fight on the Salonika front.

=== World War II ===
By 1941, SND headquarters were relocated to Chicago, Illinois, under the leadership of Mihailo Dučić, and the organization's activities and influence waned. With the arrival of Mihailo's brother, Jovan Dučić, a poet/diplomat, the Serbian National Defense Council was revived. Throughout the Second World War, the SND was heavily engaged in collecting relief funds for Serbs and supporting the Royal Yugoslav Army which during the resistance was a Chetnik cause, of course, under the command of General Dragoljub Mihailovich, appointed by the London-based Yugoslav government-in-exile at the time.

=== Contemporary period ===
After World War II, the US government under the FARA act, began an intensive probe into all Serbian Nationalist organizations in the US, primarily SND, and continued until 1947.

The SND engaged itself closely with the new Chetnik émigré groups which were forming in the United States' Midwest, and appointed Chicago-based Chetnik Voivoda Momčilo Đujić as a trustee of the organization in 1949.

In 1951, chapters of the Serbian National Defense Council were established in Hamilton, Canada under the name of Serbian National Shield Society of Canada and Sydney, Australia.

== Sloboda-Liberty Newspaper ==
Sloboda-Liberty (AKA Слобода-Liberty, Sloboda=Liberty, Sloboda/Liberty) is the official newspaper of the Serbian National Defense Council. The first issue was published October 1st, 1952. It has been continually published monthly since 1965. As of 2019, the newspaper was circulated to an estimated 2000 people by subscriptions.

Sloboda-Liberty is written in both Cyrillic and English. It covers topics of interest to the Serbian diaspora community, as well as advertising festivals and public events for members of the Serbian National Defense Council.

== See also ==
- Peter II of Yugoslavia
- Alexander, Crown Prince of Yugoslavia
- Serbian nationalism
- Serbian diaspora
- Serbian Americans
- Serbian Canadians
- Serbian Australians
- Chetniks
