= Marcellus Hartley Dodge Jr. =

American corporate heir (1908–1930)

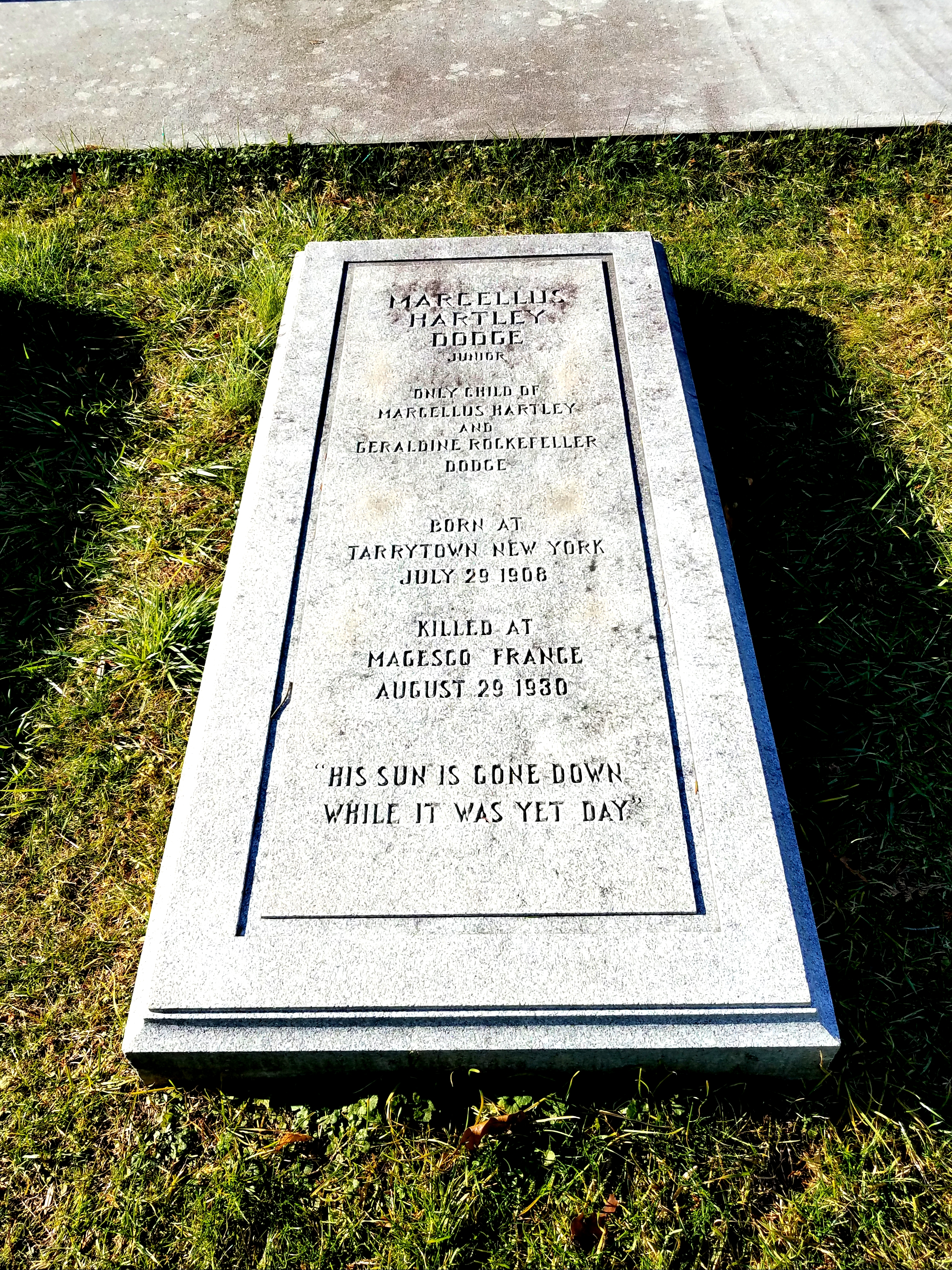
- Gravestone of Marcellus Hartley Dodge Jr. in Sleepy Hollow Cemetery
- Born: July 29, 1908; North Tarrytown, New York, U.S.
- Died: August 29, 1930 (aged 22); France
- Parent(s): Marcellus Hartley Dodge Sr. Ethel Geraldine Rockefeller

Marcellus Hartley Dodge Jr. (July 29, 1908 – August 29, 1930) was an American heir. He was the heir to the Remington-Rockefeller fortune. He lived at Giralda Farms in Madison, New Jersey. He died in a car accident in France.

== Life ==
Dodge was born in North Tarrytown, New York (now Sleepy Hollow), to Ethel Geraldine Rockefeller and Marcellus Hartley Dodge Sr. He was a grandson of William A. Rockefeller Jr., co-founder of Standard Oil; great-grandson of Remington Arms Company founder Marcellus Hartley; and grandnephew of Standard Oil's other co-founder, John D. Rockefeller. Dodge was often referred to as "Hartley."

Dodge was instantly killed in an automobile accident on August 29, 1930, when his car struck a tree on the Bayonne-Bordeaux road in Mogesca, France. The accident occurred shortly after his graduation from Princeton University in June 1930, where he played football. Two passing motorists, Henri Dupin, and Paul Theau, pulled Dodge's body, and the still living Ralph Applegate, from the burning car. Dodge's carotid artery had been severed, and the car's engine was pushed against the back seat. Marcellus Hartley Dodge Sr. went to the site of the accident, looked at the car, and talked to Dupin and Theau. Dodge's mother, Geraldine, had sent him there as a diversion from his hobby of aviation, which she felt was too dangerous.

Dodge was buried at Sleepy Hollow Cemetery in Sleepy Hollow, New York, at the foot of the mausoleum of his grandfather, William Rockefeller Jr. His mother was buried next to him 43 years later.

== Legacy ==
To honor Dodge's memory, his parents funded the Dodge Gateway on Princeton's campus in 1933, and contributed to the construction of the Marcellus Hartley Dodge Physical Fitness Center at Columbia University. Dodge's mother also gave Madison, New Jersey the Hartley Dodge Memorial Building that was dedicated on Memorial Day, Thursday, May 30, 1935 to house its police department. The building later housed Madison's Borough Hall. His mother also donated a memorial to him at the Great Swamp National Wildlife Refuge, which was founded with extensive efforts by his father.
