= Whippany River Watershed Action Committee =

- Whippany River Watershed Action Committee Inc.
- Abbreviation: WRWAC
- Formation: 1999; 27 years ago
- Type: Nonprofit
- Tax ID no.: 22-3692288
- Headquarters: Morristown, New Jersey
- Region served: Whippany River Watershed
- Chair: Siva Jonnada
- Awards: NJDEP Environmental Excellence Award in November 2013; US EPA 2001 Environmental Quality Award for Region 2; NJDEP 2002 Environmental Excellence Award
- Website: https://wrwac.org/

The Whippany River Watershed Action Committee (WRWAC) is a member-based, nonprofit 501(c)(3) organization, which identifies and implements projects to preserve and protect water and the surrounding natural areas. The Whippany River Watershed is an area of 69.3 square miles within Morris County in north central New Jersey. The 16-mile long Whippany River serves the only significant unconsolidated aquifer (the Buried Valley Aquifer system) in northern New Jersey and is a source of drinking water for more than 1 million people.

== Overview ==
With support from member municipalities, the Morris County Freeholders, individuals, civic and business partners, and conservation groups, the committee is involved with watershed management. WRWAC works with member volunteers on goose damage management, river clean-ups, lake shores and river plantings, retention and detention basins, and water samplings. WRWAC has completed projects to improve the quality of the watershed such as pollution control and management, pond restoration, stormwater runoff, river assessment, and sanitary water surveys.

It has been recognized for its works by the United States Environmental Protection Agency (EPA) and the New Jersey Department of Environmental Protection (NJDEP)

== Mission ==
WRWAC’s mission:

The Whippany River Watershed Action Committee's members are the stewards of the Whippany River Watershed. The members have come together to preserve, protect and maintain the land and water resources of the watershed through broad-based community action, projects, on-going assessment, education and promotion of resource conservation.

According to Art Vespignani, WRWAC's facilitator, "The WRWAC’s mission is to preserve, protect and maintain the land and water of the Whippany River Watershed".

== History ==
In 1998, WRWAC began as the Mayors Action Committee. Eventually, it evolved into the current 501c(3) not for profit WRWAC. Over the years, WRWAC has received several grants and partnered with entities such as the NJDEP, Rutgers University, Pfizer, and Victoria Foundation.

The State of New Jersey assigned responsibility for implementing the Whippany River Watershed Management Plan to WRWAC’s Action Committee in 2000. On September 16, 2009, WRWAC celebrated its 10th anniversary. It celebrated its 15th anniversary on September 3, 2014.

== Organization ==
WRWAC consists of an Action Committee, Executive Committee, Program Subcommittee, Outreach Subcommittee, and Membership Subcommittee.

The Board of Trustees is composed of the following member municipalities, which are represented by their appointees:

- East Hanover Township
- Florham Park
- Hanover Township
- Madison
- Mendham Borough
- Mendham Township
- Morris Plains
- Morris Township
- Morristown
- Mountain Lakes
- Parsippany-Troy Hills

Additional members include:

- Morris County Board of Chosen Freeholders
- Rutgers Cooperative Extension of Morris County
- Trout Unlimited
- Morris County Soil Conservation District
- Morris County Department of Planning and Development
- Morris County Mosquito Extermination Commission
- Morris County MUA
- Morris County Park Commission
- AmeriCorps NJ Watershed Ambassador WMA6

== Achievements ==
In 2001, the EPA bestowed the Environmental Quality Award on WRWAC. The following year, the NJDEP issued its Environmental Excellence Award to WRWAC. WRWAC received another NJDEP Environmental Excellence Award in November 2013, which it received in the Water Resources Category for implementation of clean water best management practices funded by a 319(h) grant.

WRWAC received the 2015 Morris County Municipal Utilities Authority’s Environmental Excellence Award under "Working Together for a Healthy Whippany River" for its role in producing the documentary River's Journey.

== Projects ==
Since its inception, WRWAC has been involved in numerous projects designed to preserve, protect, and maintain the watershed. The following constitute a sample of those projects.

- In 1995, WRWAC worked in conjunction with the Morris County SCD in developing a Whippany River Sediment Control Plan.
- In 2000, WRWAC spearheaded the phase one design and construction of streamside restoration for Bryant's Stream/Atno Brook and continued with phase two in 2001.
- In 2008, WRWAC, in partnership with the Rutgers Water Resources Program, assisted with the Troy Brook Regional Stormwater Management Plan Implementation.
- In 2014, WRWAC partnered with Hanover Township to develop a Stream Bank Stabilization Design for the Whippany River at the Whippany Burying Grounds; a historic cemetery established in 1718.
- In December 2014, WRWAC received a 3M Eco Grant to construct a student outdoor environmental learning project at Memorial Junior School in Hanover Township, New Jersey. WRWAC will work in conjunction with the Rutgers University Cooperative Extension to install a series of rain gardens in the courtyard area of the school and to develop in-service teacher training and educational modules for student curriculums.
- In 2015, WRWAC and the Bethel AME Church hosted the fourth annual clean-up of the Whippany River along Spring Street in Morristown, New Jersey.

== Whippany River documentary ==
In May 2014, it was announced that WRWAC, in conjunction with Hanover Township and sponsors, such as Bayer HealthCare, hired Oscar-nominated producer-director Glenn Silber to create a documentary on the Whippany River. The documentary will concentrate on the clean-up of the Whippany River over the years. Art Vespignani (WRWAC's facilitator) has stated that "[t]he documentary will focus on the threats to and solutions for the Whippany River during the past 50 years". According to Silber, the documentary presents an "opportunity to raise awareness about saving water and tell a positive story about community involvement".

The 32-minute documentary, entitled River’s Journey, focuses on the river's clean-up over the years through the collaborative efforts of government, business, volunteer organizations, and the community at large. It incorporates stories of the river told by longtime residents and illustrates current-day efforts to maintain and preserve the river. WRWAC hopes to use the documentary in schools to spread awareness of environmental preservation.

== See also ==
- Environmental protection
