= The Raptor Trust =

Wild bird rehabilitation center in New Jersey, US

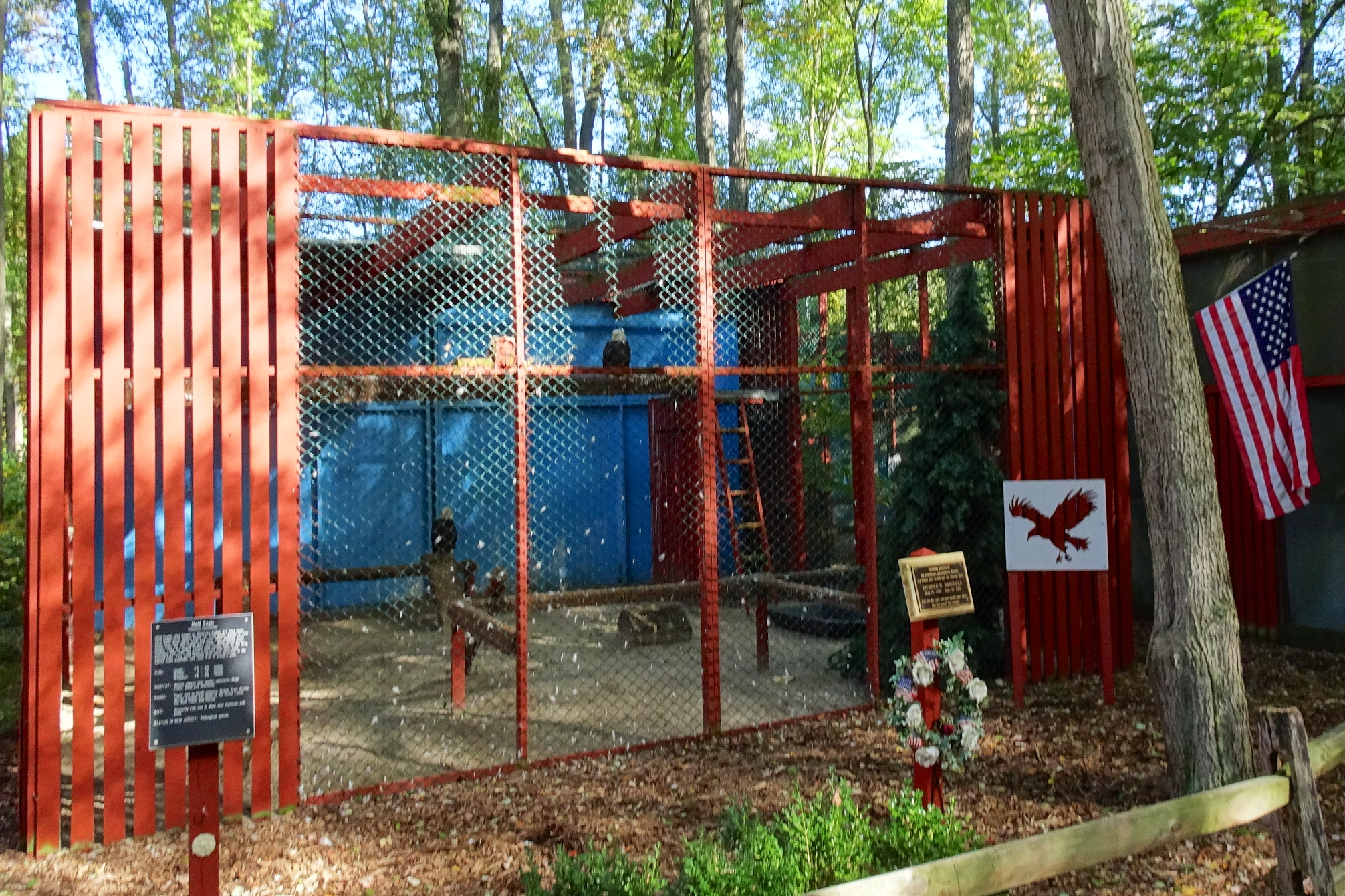
The Raptor Trust, Bald Eagle cage

The Raptor Trust is a wild bird rehabilitation center located in the Millington section of Long Hill Township in Morris County, New Jersey, United States, and surrounded by the Great Swamp National Wildlife Refuge.

== History ==
Len Soucy became interested in hawks after a visit to the Hawk Mountain Sanctuary in Pennsylvania in 1964. In 1968, he acquired 14 acres (57,000 m^{2}) in Millington, and with the help of his family started to take care of injured raptors in their backyard. Over time their efforts became known, a bird hospital was added, and by the end of the seventies, hundreds of different birds were annually brought in to be taken care of, supported by the private efforts of the Soucy family. In 1982, The Raptor Trust was founded as a non-profit organization to provide the organizational and financial infrastructure for the mission, namely to provide free care for orphaned and injured birds, to educate people about birds, especially birds of prey, and to set an example of humane conduct.

== Today ==
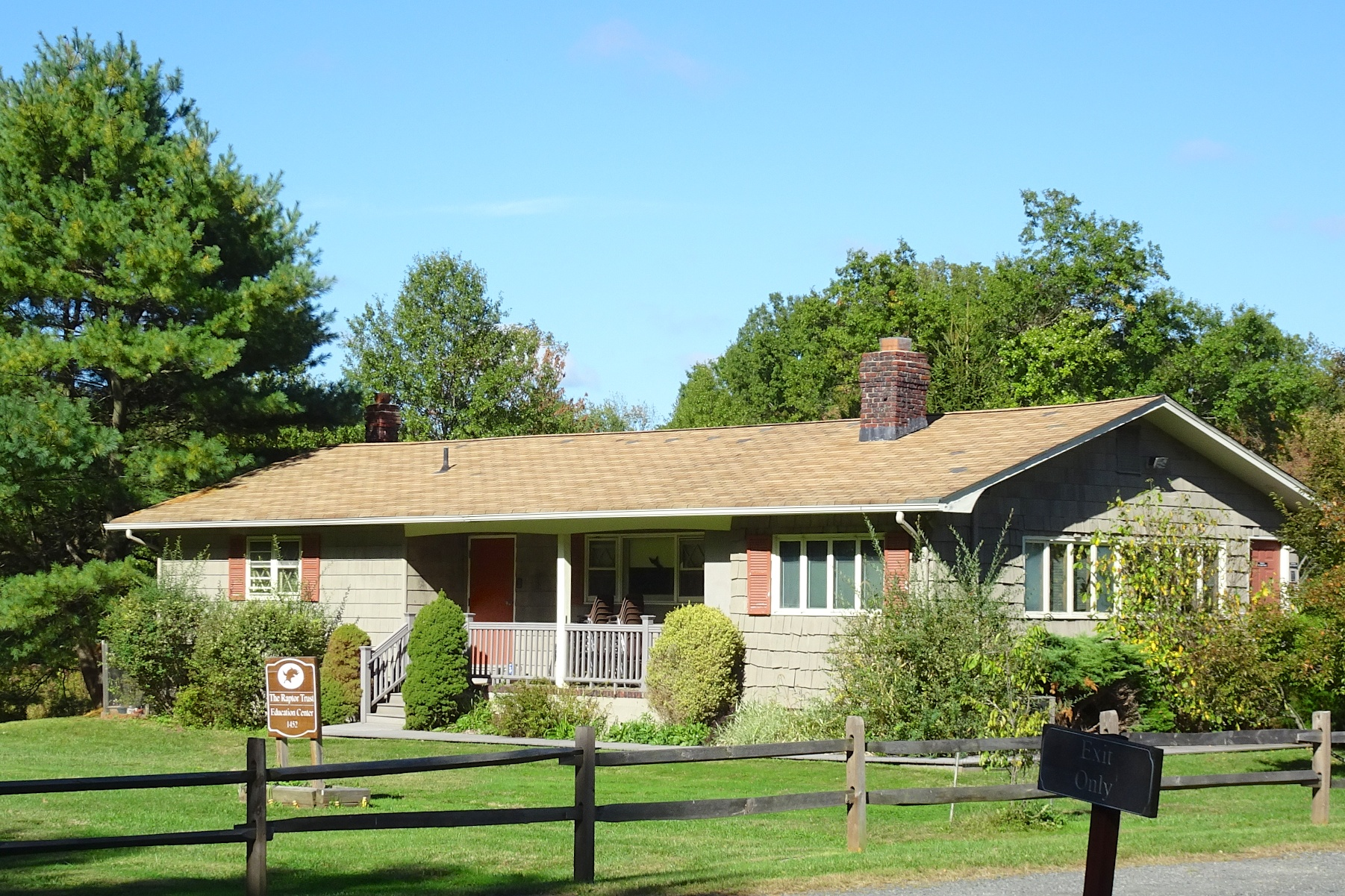
The Raptor Trust Education building

Currently the organization maintains an infirmary, educational facilities, a gift shop, and a large complex of some 70 cages and aviaries for recuperating birds that will be released and for providing refuge to unreleasable birds. About 40 hawks, eagles, and owls are permanent residents of the trust. A number of unreleasable birds have bred successfully. Unreleasable birds also can serve as foster parents to younger birds. Visitors can view the many unreleasable birds of prey of the facility at close range.
