= Whippany River =

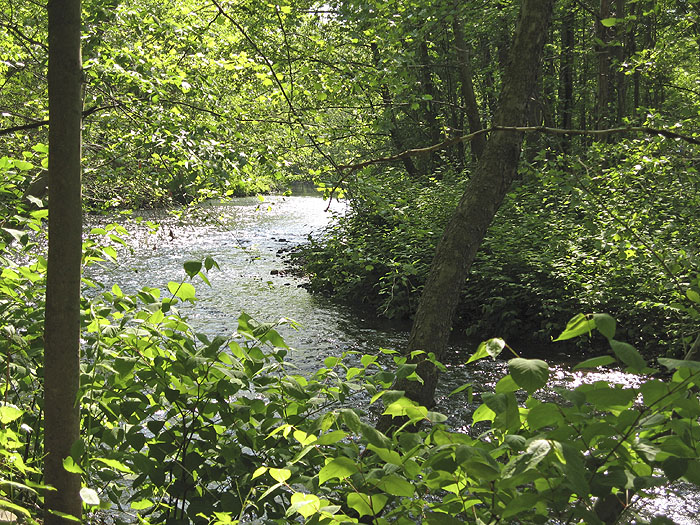
- The Whippany River as seen from the Frelinghuysen Arboretum.

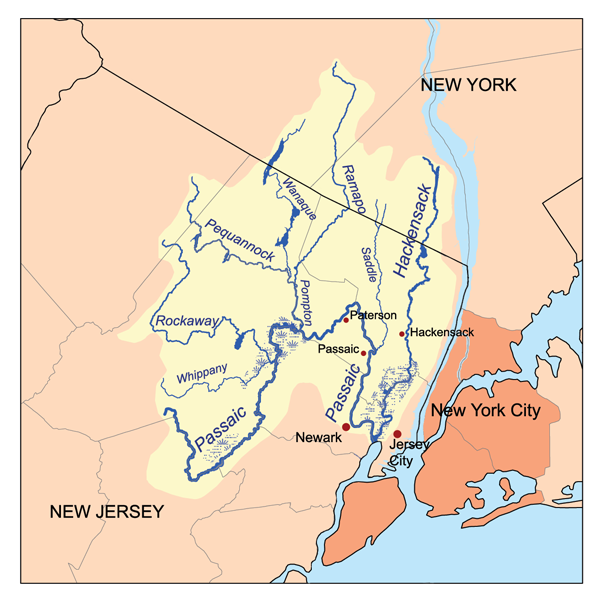
- Map of the Passaic/Hackensack watershed.

Location
- Towns: Denville; East Hanover; Florham Park; Madison; Mendham Borough; Morris Plains; Mendham Township; Morristown; Mountain Lakes; Parsippany-Troy Hills; Randolph; Whippany

Physical characteristics
- Mouth: Passaic River
- Length: 30 km (19 mi)

The Whippany River is a tributary of the Rockaway River, approximately 20 mi (30 km) long, in northern New Jersey in the United States.

It rises in Morris County, in Mendham Township west of Morristown, and flows generally ENE in a meandering course, through Morristown and the Whippany area of Hanover. It flows through the Troy Meadows and joins the Rockaway in the Hatfield Swamp in eastern Morris County, just above the confluence of the Rockaway with the Passaic River.

The river drainage area is 69 square miles (180 km^{2}).

There are three USGS water gauges on the river. The gauge in Parsippany just before the Whippany River empties into the Rockaway River has an average flow of 178 cubic feet (5 m^{3}) per second.

The river derives its name from the Whippanong Native Americans, a tribe that once inhabited the area. Whippanong meant "place of the willows", named for the trees growing along the banks of the river.

== History ==
=== Munsee Lenape ===
Circa 1500, the Whippany River was part of the Lenapehoking (along with the rest of New Jersey) and was inhabited by the Munsee Lenape. The Munsee harvested mussels from the Whippany River.

=== Colonial settlement ===
In 1685, European settlers constructed homes along the Whippany River. The river provided the hydropower for the various mills of Whippany.

=== Modern history ===
In 1998, the Mayor's Action Committee, later known as the Whippany River Watershed Action Committee (WRWAC), was established, with the goal of protecting the watershed. The Committee is sponsored by grants from NJDEP, Victoria Foundation, Rutgers University, Pfizer, and other corporations. It is partnered with 16 local municipalities. The Committee hosts canoe trips, festivals, hikes, educational outreach, classes, civic organizations, engineering roundtables, goose workshops, and stormwater conferences. Volunteers form a significant part of its research teams and workforce. The Whippany River Watershed Action Committee is working to eliminate invasive species to protect the watershed. Today, the watershed provides drinking water to over a million in Morris County.

== See also ==
- List of rivers of New Jersey
- Whippany River Watershed Action Committee
- Patriots' Path
