= Helen Hartley Jenkins =

American philanthropist (1860–1934)

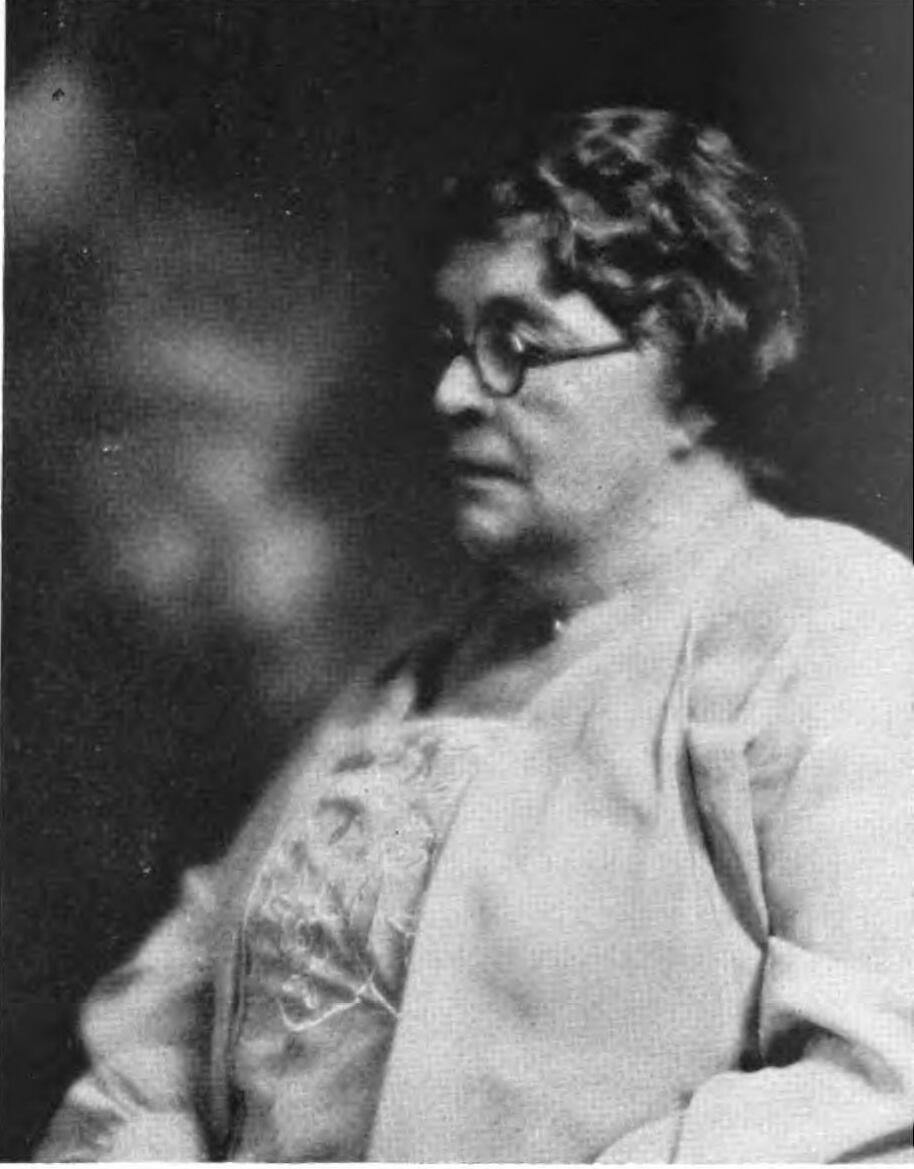
Helen Hartley Jenkins

Helen Hartley Jenkins (August 16, 1860 – April 24, 1934) was an American philanthropist who contributed toward creation of health institutions, expansion of universities and supporting social welfare activities.

== Biography ==
Born on August 16, 1860, in New York, NY, Helen Hartley Jenkins was the daughter of Marcellus Hartley, the founder of Union Metallic Cartridge Company which was later merged with Remington Arms company, and his wife Frances Chester White. She attended private schools in New York.

She was engaged in charitable activities from childhood. Following her father's death in 1902, she inherited a large fortune. In 1903, she, with her nephew Marcellus Hartley Dodge, jointly gave Hartley Hall, a dormitory, to Columbia University. A few years later she anonymously donated $350,000 for the building of Philosophy Hall at Columbia. In memory of her daughter Helen who died in 1920, she gave the gates at the main entrance of Barnard College, her daughter's alma mater. She also endowed and equipped the Marcellus Hartley laboratory for research in electricity.

She was a principal donor of New York Polyclinic hospital. She also endowed (1910 and 1921) Marcellus Hartley Chair of Materia Medica of New York University Medical School. Between 1907 and 1934, she served as trustee of Teachers College, Columbia University. She served as president of board of trustees of Hartley House from 1926 to 1934. To promote specialized nursing education and training, she donated $150,000 in 1910 and $200,000 later for creating a new nursing department at Teachers College, Columbia University.

In 1909 she established the Slavonic Immigrant Home in New York. She was a benefactor of the Tan Hus Bohemian Presbyterian Church in New York.

On June 30, 1892, she married George Walker Jenkins who was the president of American Deposit and Loan Company. They had two daughters.

In 1914, Professor Michael Pupin appointed Mrs. H.H. Jenkins and Helen Losanitch Frothingham honorary members of the Serbian National Defense Council

She died on April 24, 1934, in Morristown, New Jersey.
