= William Rockefeller Jr. =

American businessman and financier (1841-1922)

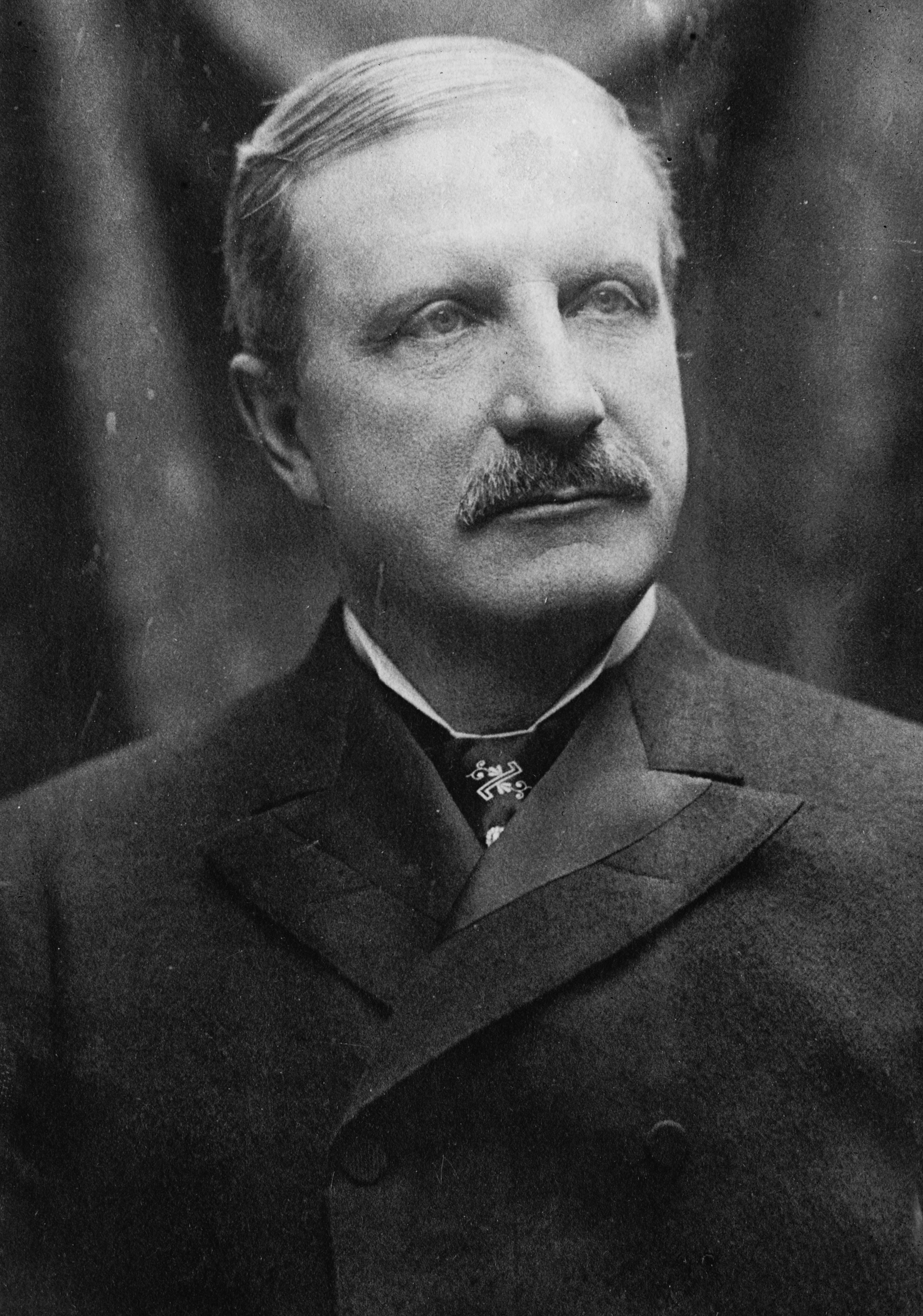
- Born: William Avery Rockefeller Jr. May 31, 1841; Richford, New York, U.S.
- Died: June 24, 1922 (aged 81); Rockwood Hall, Mount Pleasant, New York, U.S.
- Burial place: Sleepy Hollow Cemetery, New York
- Occupations: Financier, businessman
- Known for: Co-founder of Standard Oil
- Spouse: Almira Geraldine Goodsell (m. 1864; died 1920)
- Children: 6, including: William Goodsell Rockefeller; Percy Avery Rockefeller; Geraldine Rockefeller Dodge
- Parent(s): William Rockefeller Sr. Eliza Davison
- Relatives: Rockefeller family

William Avery Rockefeller Jr. (May 31, 1841 – June 24, 1922) was an American businessman and financier. Rockefeller was a co-founder of Standard Oil along with his elder brother John Davison Rockefeller. He was also a part owner of Anaconda Copper, which was the fourth-largest company in the world by the late 1920s. Rockefeller started his business career as a clerk at 16. In 1867, he joined his brother's company, Rockefeller, Andrews & Flagler, which later became Standard Oil. The company was eventually split up by the Supreme Court in 1911. Rockefeller also had a significant involvement in the copper industry. In 1899, Rockefeller and Standard Oil principal Henry H. Rogers joined with Anaconda Company founder Marcus Daly to create the Amalgamated Copper Mining Company, which later returned to the name Anaconda Copper.

He married Almira Geraldine Goodsell in 1864, and they had six children. Rockefeller died in 1922, leaving a gross estate of $102 million, significantly reduced by debts and taxes. He was a prominent member of the Rockefeller family, contributing to its reputation as a leading American business dynasty.

== Early years ==
William Avery Rockefeller Jr. was born in Richford, New York. He was the middle son of con artist William Avery Rockefeller Sr. and Eliza Davison. In addition to elder brother John, William Jr.'s siblings were Lucy, Mary, and twins Franklin (Frank) and Frances (who died young). He also had two elder half-sisters, Clorinda (who died young) and Cornelia, through his father's affairs with mistress and housekeeper Nancy Brown. In 1853 his family moved to Strongsville, Ohio. As a young pupil in public school, he was reportedly inspired and motivated by his teacher-mentor, Rufus Osgood Mason.

== Business career ==
At the age of sixteen, he began work as a clerk for a miller in Cleveland, Ohio. About two years later, he joined his older brother's produce commission business, Clark and Rockefeller, which later supplied provisions to the Union Army.

=== Oil business ===
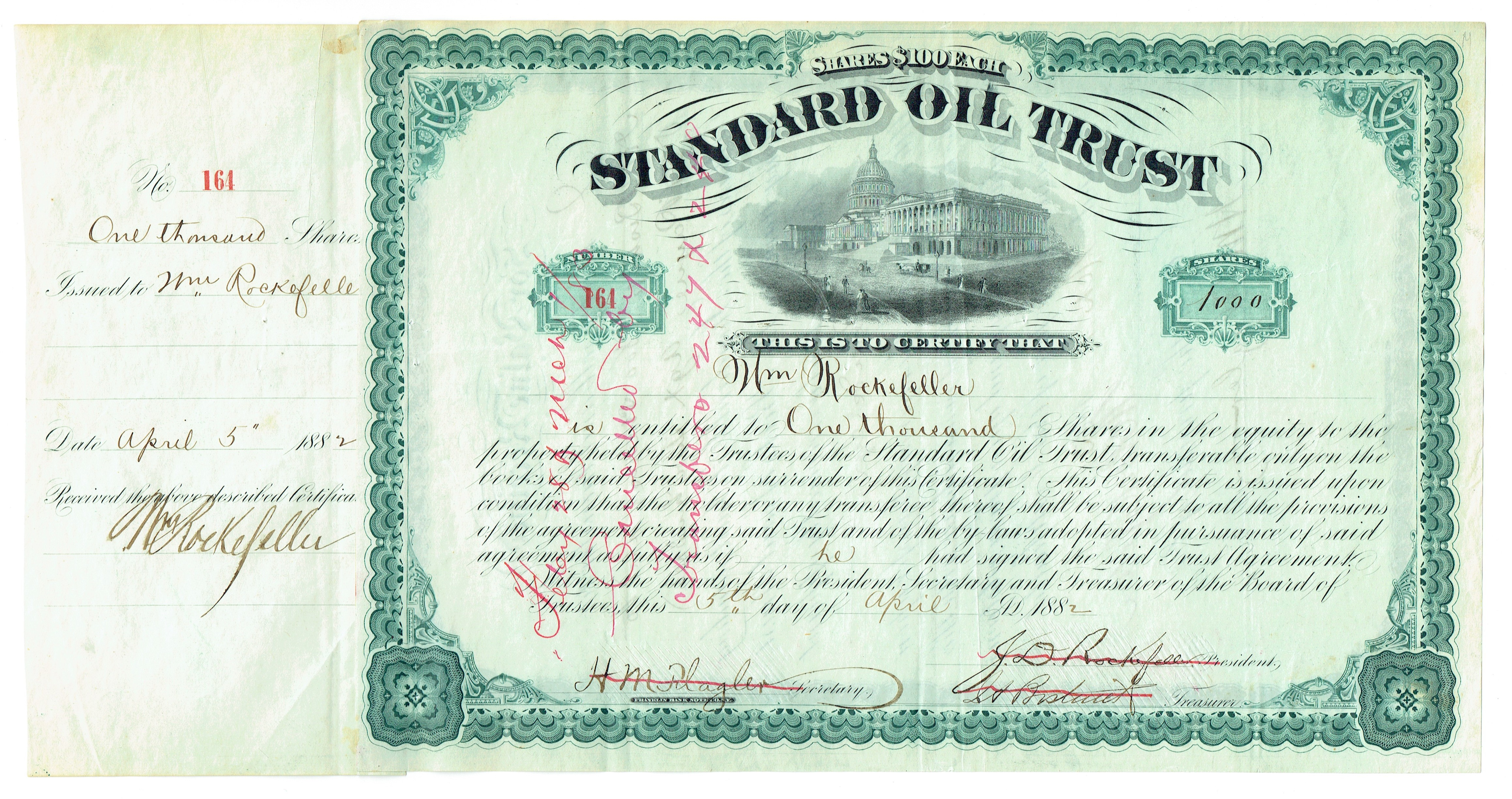
Share of the Standard Oil Trust dated April 5, 1882, issued to William Rockefeller

Rockefeller was very adept in business matters. When John D. formed Rockefeller, Andrews & Flagler in 1867, he invited William to take charge of the company's export business in New York. In 1867, William Rockefeller and Co. was formed as a subsidiary to Rockefeller and Andrews. In 1870, that company became Standard Oil. In 1911 Standard Oil of New Jersey was split up by the United States Supreme Court.

=== Copper mining ===
In 1899, Rockefeller joined fellow Standard Oil principal Henry H. Rogers and Anaconda Copper Company founder Marcus Daly in forming the Amalgamated Copper Mining Company, a holding company that intended to control the copper industry. With Daly as company president and Rogers as Vice-President, Rockefeller and Rogers devised a scheme which earned them a profit of $36 million. First, they purchased Anaconda Properties from Daly for $39 million, with the understanding that the check was to be deposited in the bank and remain there for a definite time (National City Bank was run by Rockefeller's friends). Rogers and Rockefeller then set up a paper organization, known as the Amalgamated Copper Mining Company, with their own clerks as dummy directors, saying the company was worth $75 million.

They had Amalgamated Copper Company buy Anaconda from them for $75 million in capital stock, which was conveniently printed for the purpose. Then, they borrowed $39 million from the bank using Amalgamated Copper as collateral. They paid back Daly for Anaconda and sold $75 million worth of stock in Amalgamated Copper to the public. They paid back the bank's $39 million and had a profit of $36 million in cash.

After Daly died in November 1900, banker John Dennis Ryan rose to head Amalgamated's Montana operations. Amalgamated acquired two large competitors, and soon controlled all the mines of Butte, Montana. The company returned to the name Anaconda in 1915, and by the late 1920s Anaconda Copper Company was the fourth-largest company in the world.

From 1912 to 1913, the Pujo Committee investigated Rockefeller and others for allegedly earning $30 million in profit through cornering the copper market and "synchronizing with artificially enforced activity" in Amalgamated Copper stock in the New York Stock Exchange.

When the newly formed Mutual Alliance Trust Company opened for business in New York on the Tuesday after June 29, 1902, there were 13 directors, including Emanuel Lehman and Rockefeller.

== Personal life ==
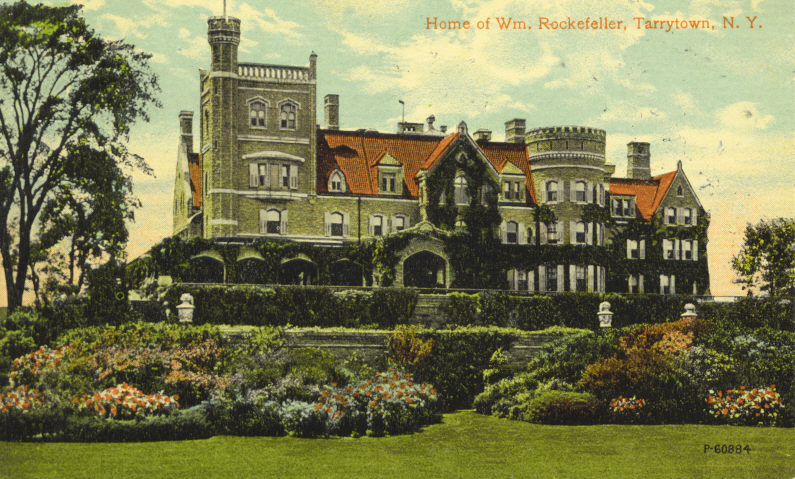
Rockwood Hall, William Rockefeller's home outside Sleepy Hollow, New York

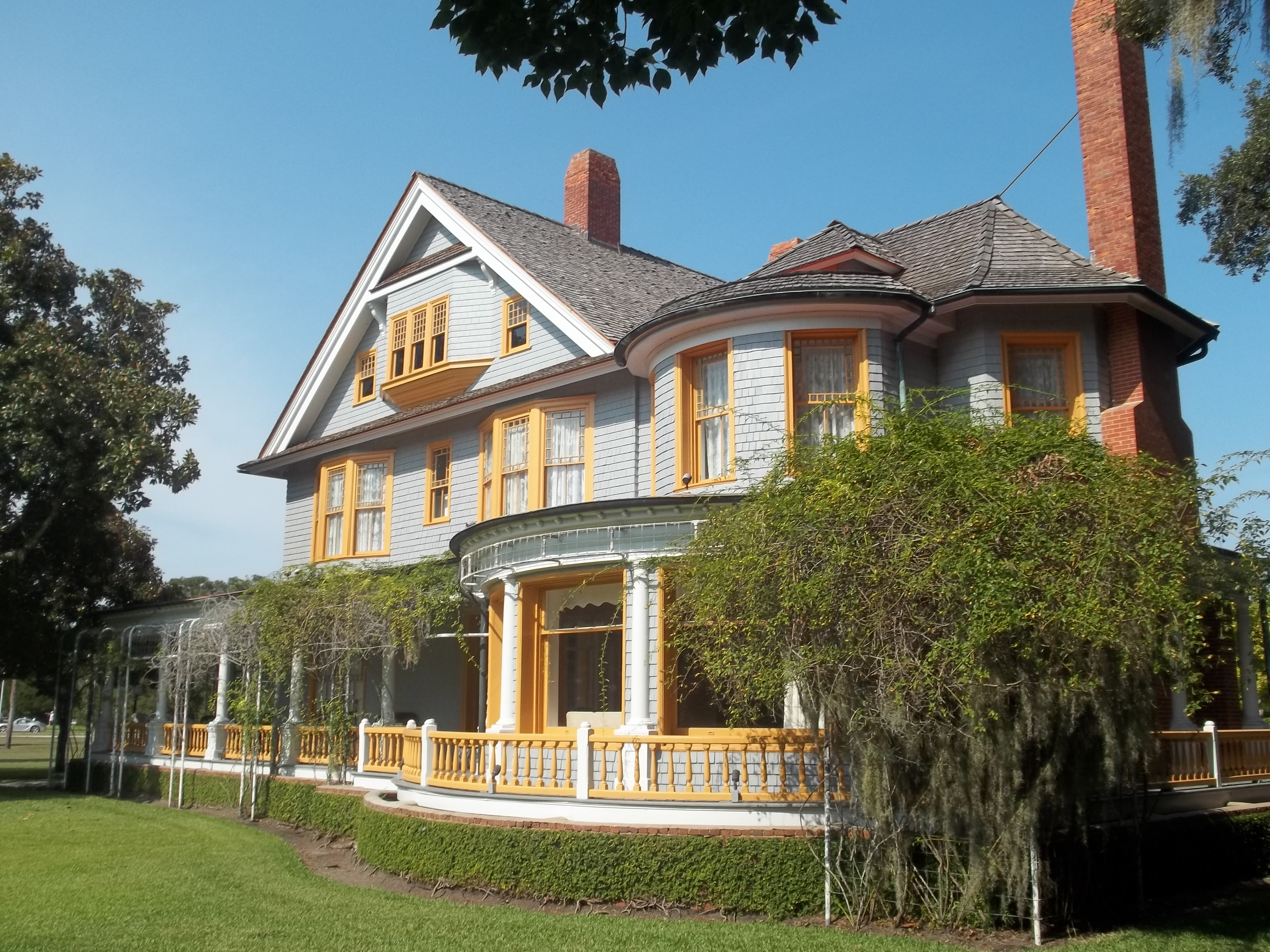
Rockefeller (Indian Mound) Cottage on Jekyll Island

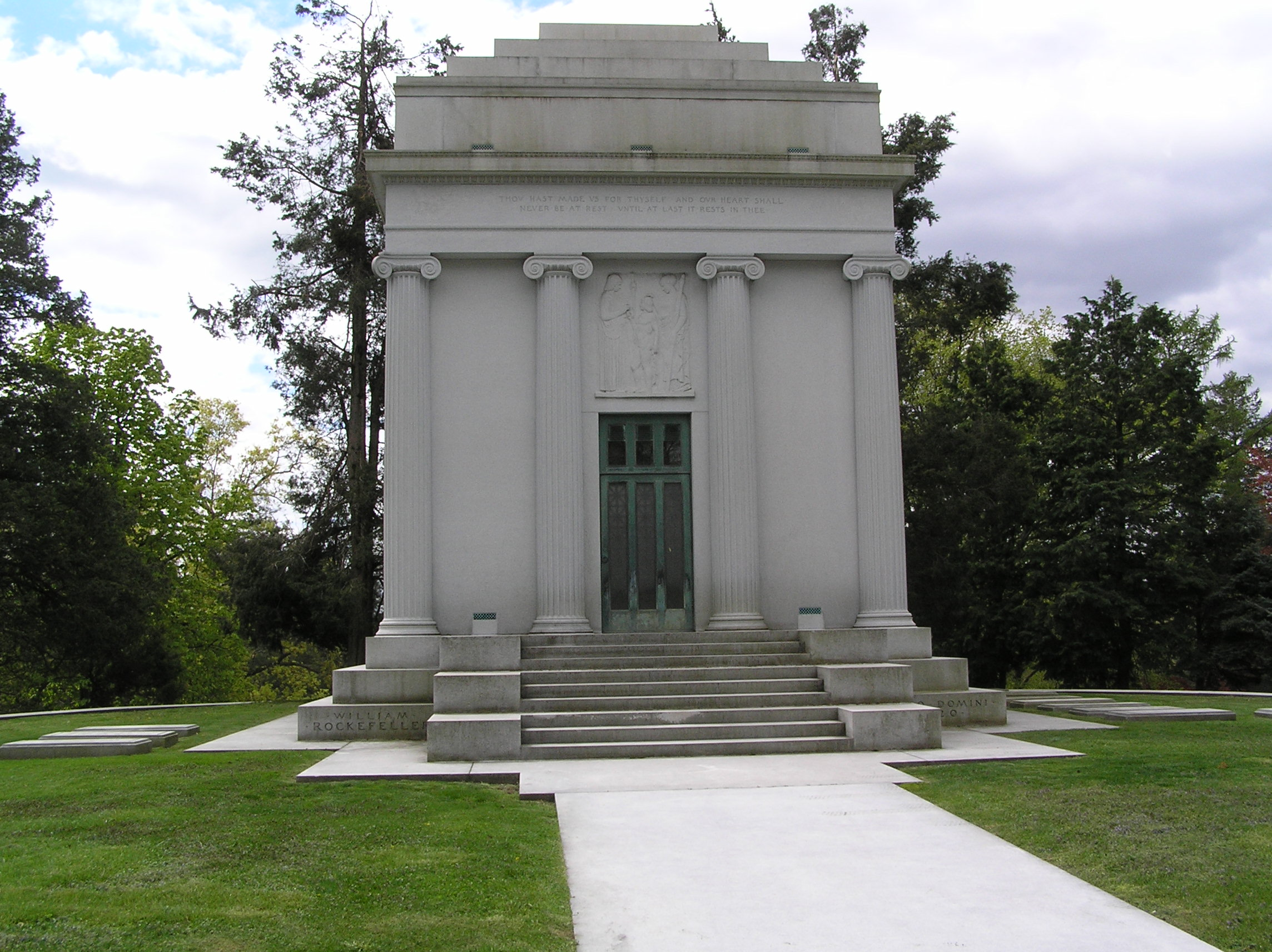
William Rockefeller Mausoleum in Sleepy Hollow Cemetery

He was the first of several members of the Rockefeller family to attend the Fifth Avenue Baptist Church; he became a major financier of the church in the 1870s. William and his brother John D. Rockefeller later became trustees of the church.

Rockefeller married Almira Geraldine Goodsell (March 19, 1844 – January 17, 1920) on May 25, 1864, in Fairfield, Connecticut. There were many connections among this and other elite families. Her sister Esther Judson Goodsell was married to Oliver Burr Jennings, who became one of the original stockholders of Standard Oil. Together, William and Almira had:

1. Lewis Edward Rockefeller (March 2, 1865 – August 3, 1866)
2. Emma Rockefeller (June 8, 1868 – August 11, 1934), who married Dr. David Hunter McAlpin Jr.
3. William Goodsell Rockefeller (May 21, 1870 – November 30, 1922), who married Sarah Elizabeth "Elsie" Stillman
4. John Davison Rockefeller II (March 8, 1872 – 1877)
5. Percy Avery Rockefeller (February 27, 1878 – September 25, 1934), who married Isabel Goodrich Stillman
6. Ethel Geraldine Rockefeller (April 3, 1882 – August 13, 1973), who married Marcellus Hartley Dodge Sr.

William Rockefeller Jr. died of pneumonia on June 24, 1922, in Rockwood Hall. He had caught a cold during a car trip he took with brother John and nephew John Jr. to visit his childhood home in Richford, New York. He was interred in the historic Sleepy Hollow Cemetery (less than a mile south of Rockwood Hall) in the monumental William Rockefeller Mausoleum, which he had built for his wife, who had predeceased him by two years.

The New York Times, in discussing a trust that Rockefeller set up for his born and yet-to-be born great-grandchildren, stated that he "left a gross estate of $102,000,000 which was reduced to $50,000,000 principally by $30,000,000 of debts and $18,600,000 of inheritance and estate taxes."

Rockefeller was a regular attendee of the Saint Mary's Episcopal Church in Scarborough in the last few years of his life.

=== Descendants ===
Rockefeller and Almira's elder daughter, Emma Rockefeller, married Dr. David Hunter McAlpin Jr., a notable physician and the son of prominent industrialist and real estate owner David Hunter McAlpin.

The younger daughter, Ethel Geraldine Rockefeller, married Marcellus Hartley Dodge Sr., president of The Remington Arms Company. Known as Geraldine, she was a highly respected expert on dogs and a great patron of the arts. The Dodges' only child, Marcellus Hartley Dodge Jr., heir of two massive fortunes, was killed in an automobile accident at the age of 22.

Two of Rockefeller and Almira's sons, William Goodsell Rockefeller and Percy Avery Rockefeller, married daughters of James Jewett Stillman and Sarah Elizabeth Stillman. James Stillman was president and chairman of the board of directors of the National City Bank. In their chronicle of the Rockefeller family, Peter Collier and David Horowitz note:

Most of the storybook marriages of the time were between continental nobility and wealthy young American women. Yet the significant marriages occurred at home, serving to unite almost all the wealthy families as distant cousins or even closer. There was the bond of the William Rockefellers and the Stillmans. [...] ‘‘High” society became an increasingly small world. (The Rockefellers: An American Dynasty)

Both sons were financiers and board directors of multiple companies, including the National City Bank, of which their father-in-law had been president and chairman of the board. James Stillman Rockefeller, son of William Goodsell Rockefeller, married Nancy Carnegie, grandniece of Andrew Carnegie. An Olympic rowing champion, he also joined the National City Bank. Like his maternal grandfather, James Stillman, he eventually became the bank's president and later chairman of the board.

=== Residences ===
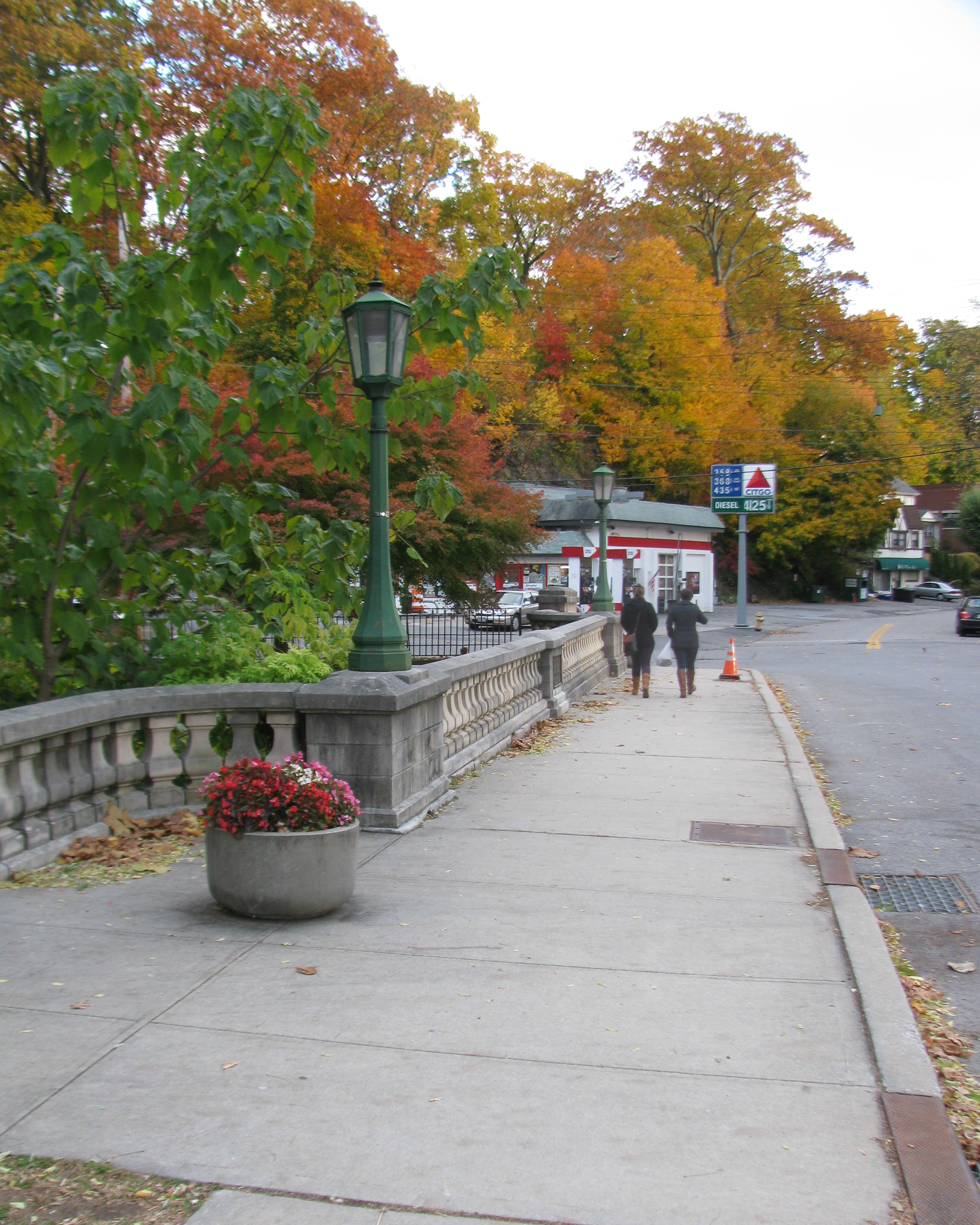
Bridge on Broadway (U.S. Route 9) in Sleepy Hollow, built by William Rockefeller in 1912

The Rockefeller (Indian Mound) Cottage is a house on Jekyll Island, Georgia, located next to the Jekyll Island Club. The house was built by businessman Gordon McKay in 1892 and called Indian Mound Cottage. McKay died in 1903, and the house was bought by William Rockefeller in 1905. Rockefeller used it as a winter home and made extensive changes to the house. The house remained in the Rockefeller family until 1947, when the Jekyll Island Authority bought the property. It was open as a museum from 1950 until 1968, when it was closed for badly needed repairs. In 1971, the Indian Mound Cottage was listed on the National Register of Historic Places as "Rockefeller Cottage." It is now part of the Jekyll Island Club National Historic Landmark District.

In 1886, Rockefeller bought property in Westchester County, New York, along the Hudson River from General Lloyd Aspinwall. He renovated or rebuilt Aspinwall's mansion, called Rockwood Hall. It would become the second-largest private house in the U.S. at the time. William's decision to build his home in Westchester was a key factor in his brother John D. Rockefeller Jr.'s decision to buy land nearby in Pocantico Hills, starting in 1893. John D. Rockefeller's estate, Kykuit, was less than a mile from Rockwood Hall. The two properties eventually comprised a single large Rockefeller estate area, connected by a network of carriage roads designed by the family. After William's death, his heirs put the property up for sale. However, no individual buyer could be found, and the property was broken up. In the 1940s, the mansion was demolished, and the land was incorporated into the Rockefeller State Park Preserve. The only physical remnants of Rockefeller's estate are the terraced foundation of the mansion, the gatehouse on U.S. Route 9, and a road bridge in Sleepy Hollow, also on U.S. Route 9, built by Rockefeller in 1912. He insisted that his name was not to be placed on the bridge's commemorative plaque.

== See also ==
- List of German Americans
- List of richest Americans in history
