= Great Swamp Watershed Association =

EarthSea Conservation nonprofit organization

- Abbreviation: GSWA
- Formation: 1981; 45 years ago
- Type: Nonprofit
- Tax ID no.: 22-2403906
- Legal status: 501(c)(3)
- Headquarters: Morristown, New Jersey
- Board Chair: B. David Naidu
- Executive Director: Bill Kibler
- Website: https://www.greatswamp.org/

The Great Swamp Watershed Association is a member-based, non-profit, 501(c)(3) conservation organization dedicated to preserving and protecting water and natural areas. Their programs serve all who live, work, or play in the Great Swamp watershed in Morris County, New Jersey. For over 40 years the association has been acting on behalf of local communities to ensure that water is safe and pure and open space is protected.

The Great Swamp watershed offers residents and visitors nearly 36,000 acres (150 km^{2}) of unique and beautiful landscape at the edge of urban and suburban development. Five streams in the watershed form the Passaic River, which provides potable water for over a million New Jersey residents.

Their vision for a better world begins with healthy communities in which the water is clean and pure, and natural areas—such as the Great Swamp National Wildlife Refuge, Loantaka Brook Reservation, and Jockey Hollow provide places where people can seek renewal and a sense of peace.

== History ==
The Great Swamp Watershed Association was formed in 1981. It started as a small grassroots organization and has grown to serve 2,200 members in over 40 municipalities in New Jersey.

== See also ==
- Biodiversity
- Earth Science
- Ecology
- List of conservation and restoration organizations
- Natural environment
- Sustainability
