= Lake Passaic =

Former proglacial lake in New Jersey, U.S.

Coordinates: 40.7597°N 74.4020°W

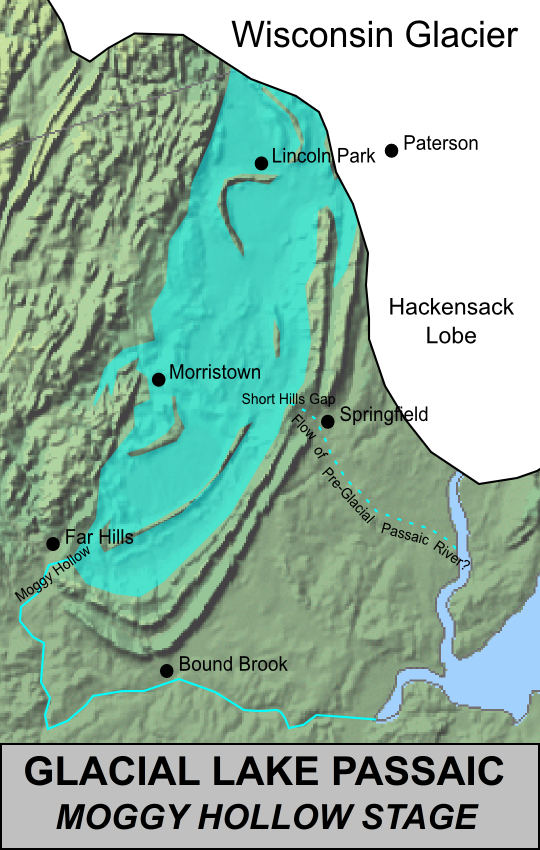
Approximation of the extent of Glacial Lake Passaic

Lake Passaic was a prehistoric proglacial lake that existed in northern New Jersey in the United States at the end of the last ice age approximately 19,000–14,000 years ago. The lake was formed of waters released by the retreating Wisconsin Glacier, which had pushed large quantities of earth and rock ahead of its advance, blocking the previous natural drainage of the ancestral Passaic River through a gap in the central Watchung Mountains. The lake persisted for several thousand years as melting ice and eroding moraine dams slowly drained the former lake basin. The effect of the lake's creation permanently altered the course of the Passaic River, forcing it to take a circuitous route through the northern Watchung Mountains before spilling out into the lower piedmont.

Today, the former lake basin is called Passaic Meadows and includes the Great Swamp, Black Meadows, Troy Meadows, Hatfield Swamp, Lee Meadows, Little Piece Meadows, Great Piece Meadows, Glenhurst Meadows, and Bog and Vly Meadows. These remnants of the ancient lake provide prime wetland habitat to a variety of plants and animals while at the same time offering recreational and outdoor opportunities to residents of northern New Jersey.

== Discovery ==
The discovery of Glacial Lake Passaic is credited to Professor George Hammell Cook, once the State Geologist of New Jersey and Vice President of Rutgers University. Cook's first official mention of the lake was in the New Jersey Annual Report of the State Geologist for the Year 1880, in which he described flat-topped hills and drift-like deposits in the upper Passaic Valley that appeared to be created or modified by the waters of a lake. Twelve years later, field research conducted under State Geologist John C. Smock began to uncover wave-cut terraces and other shoreline features that more conclusively established the lake's existence. However, the boundaries of the lake were not completely understood until the following year, 1893, when geologists Rollin D. Salisbury and Henry B. Kümmel completed a study of wave cut terraces, shoreline platforms, and delta deposits within the central and upper Passaic basin. The study was used to create a report, Lake Passaic – An Extinct Glacial Lake, which was included in the New Jersey Annual Report of the State Geologist for the Year 1893.

== Geology ==
During the late Triassic and early Jurassic periods, when the North American plate separated from the African plate, an aborted rift system was created. The resulting rift valley, known as the Newark Basin, was filled with alternating layers of red bed sediment and flood basalts. Over millions of years, the rift valley was faulted, tilted, and eroded, until the edges of the hard flood basalt layers formed ridges. Prior to 20,000 years before the present, an ancestral Passaic River flowed through a gap in these ridges. This changed when the Wisconsin Glacier, a massive continental ice sheet which formed during the last ice age, advanced on the region and permanently plugged the gap. As the glacier eventually melted back, water pooled behind the ridges (known today as the Watchung Mountains), forming Glacial Lake Passaic.

== Lake stages ==
Glacial Lake Passaic was a dynamic water body during its five millennia of existence. At present, the lake is believed to have existed in four major stages, the final stage being split between three smaller sub-stages. Each stage saw a new shoreline elevation of the lake as ice or earthen moraine dams were built or gave way, often over brief spans of time.

=== Chatham Stage ===
Approximately 20,000 years ago, the Wisconsin Glacier advanced across northern New Jersey, expanding differentially across the land as it encountered variable terrain. West of the Watchung Mountains and east of the Appalachians, the Passaic lobe of the great glacier was impeded by rugged terrain, slowing its southward advance. East of the Watchung Mountains, the Hackensack lobe of the glacier spread more easily over the piedmont lowlands, advancing on the Hobart/Short Hills Gap.

Previously, an ancestral Passaic River flowed southeast toward Raritan Bay through the gap, but as the Hackensack lobe dammed it with ice, a lake began to form, reaching depths of nearly 200 feet. The resulting body of water formed the Chatham Stage, which initially found an outlet to the sea via the Blue Brook Valley, between the ridges of First and Second Watchung Mountain south of the Short Hills Gap. This outlet, however, was cut off as the Hackensack lobe continued to push south.

=== Moggy Hollow Stage ===
The Hackensack lobe of the Wisconsin Glacier piled a massive moraine into the Short Hills Gap and northern Blue Brook Valley, effectively creating a permanent dam even after the ice began retreating to the north. With its outlet to the sea severed, Glacial Lake Passaic rose until it found a new escape point via a gap in the southwestern Watchung Mountains known as Moggy Hollow.

The Moggy Hollow Stage came to be the deepest stage of the ancient lake, reaching a depth of about 300 ft. Eventually, it came to cover the greatest area too. As the Wisconsin Glacier melted back, the lake's waters ultimately submerged an area stretching from the base of Preakness Mountain in Wayne to the northern slope of Second Watchung Mountain in Liberty Corner. During this time, it is believed that the ridges of Third Watchung Mountain formed a sinuous chain of islands running down the length of lake.

=== Great Notch Stage ===
The first major drop in the level of Glacial Lake Passaic occurred as the Wisconsin Glacier melted back to reveal the Great Notch, a significant gap present in the ridge of First Watchung Mountain in Clifton. In a short span of time, the level of the lake fell approximately 80 feet, the resulting drainage carving a spillway that would eventually become the valley of the Third River.

The Great Notch Stage, as it came to be called, produced a lake of similar depth to the Chatham Stage, although covering a greater area. It is believed that Hook Mountain, one of the ridges of Third Watchung Mountain, was still an island at this time.

=== Postglacial stages ===
The Great Notch Stage came to an end as the Wisconsin Glacier withered to reveal a gap in First Watchung Mountain in Paterson. The gap's initial opening likely caused a flood which carved the valley of Weasel Brook, but the outflow eventually migrated further north, forming the course of the Passaic River as it exists today.

The release of water through the gap at Paterson saw the destruction of the last remaining ice dam holding back the lake. But topography and moraine deposits left in key chokepoints allowed the remains of the Great Notch Stage to split into three lakes of considerable size. These lakes would persist for another 3000 to 4000 years.

==== Totowa Stage ====
The Totowa Stage was most northern of the three postglacial lakes, occupying an irregular basin extending from Oakland to Whippany. The lake was held back by a dam of glacial sediment in Totowa that slowly eroded until the surface of the lake fell to its present-day level, leaving behind the Hatfield Swamp, Black Meadows, Great Piece Meadows, and Bog and Vly Meadows.

==== Stanley Stage ====
Upstream of the Totowa Stage, and lying between Second and Third Watchung Mountain, was the Stanley Stage. The lake occupied an area between Stanley (near Summit) and Millington, and was held back by moraine deposits. As with the Totowa stage, the lake's earthen dam eroded away until the lake reached its modern level, forming Glenhurst Meadows.

==== Millington Stage ====
The most upstream of three lakes, the Millington Stage was probably 50 feet deep at maximum, occupying the basin west of Long Hill, the southernmost ridge of Third Watchung Mountain. Unlike the other two lakes, the Millington Stage drained over the trap rock crest of Long Hill. But even rock could not contain one of the last pieces of Glacial Lake Passaic. By about 14,000 years ago, water spilling through a gap in Long Hill carved the Millington Gorge, which lowered the level of the lake to form the present-day Great Swamp.

== Modern lake basin ==
=== Conservation ===
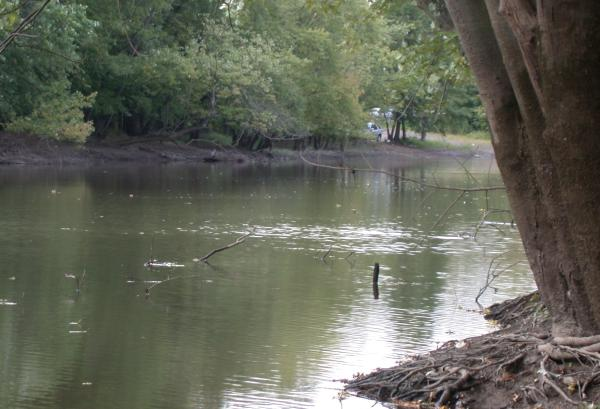
A typical scene along the Passaic River which results from the drainage of the Great Swamp, a remnant of the Glacial Lake Passaic

The remnants of the Glacial Lake Passaic lake bed are found in several swamps in northern New Jersey, most notably, the Great Swamp that is south of Morristown through Chatham Township, lying in extreme southern Morris County and northeastern Somerset County. The watershed of the Great Swamp entails 55 square miles (140 km^{2}). Within this watershed, Black Brook, Great Brook, Loantaka Brook, Primrose Brook, and the Upper Passaic River combine their waters in the Great Swamp to form the Passaic River, which exits the swamp via the Millington Gorge.

Following the largest American conservation effort by residents in response to a proposal to build a huge fourth regional airport that would have destroyed the ecosystem, a major portion of this watershed was acquired through assembling purchases made during a year-long effort that began in 1959. Those properties, entailing 7,600 acres (31 km^{2}) or just under twelve square miles, were preserved through a donation to the federal government on November 3, 1960, setting them aside as a park for perpetual protection. The area given to the government has since become the Great Swamp National Wildlife Refuge and now is watched over by citizens from the ten communities that ring the swamp, who have formed thirteen separate oversight organizations. Additions to the area have continued to the present day.

=== Flooding ===
Chronic flooding in the central Passaic basin, particularly around the confluence of the Passaic and Pompton rivers, has been severe enough to lead to government buyouts of private land. This section of the basin, upstream of the chokepoint created by the Little Falls and the Great Falls, occasionally fills with so much water that some of the Totowa Stage of Glacial Lake Passaic briefly reappears until enough time has gone by for the water to drain out. The Passaic River Flood Tunnel, a floodwater diversion system, has been proposed to create a new escape route for water trapped behind the Watchung Mountains.

== See also ==
- List of prehistoric lakes
