= Great Swamp National Wildlife Refuge =

Protected area in New Jersey, United States

- IUCN category IV (habitat/species management area)
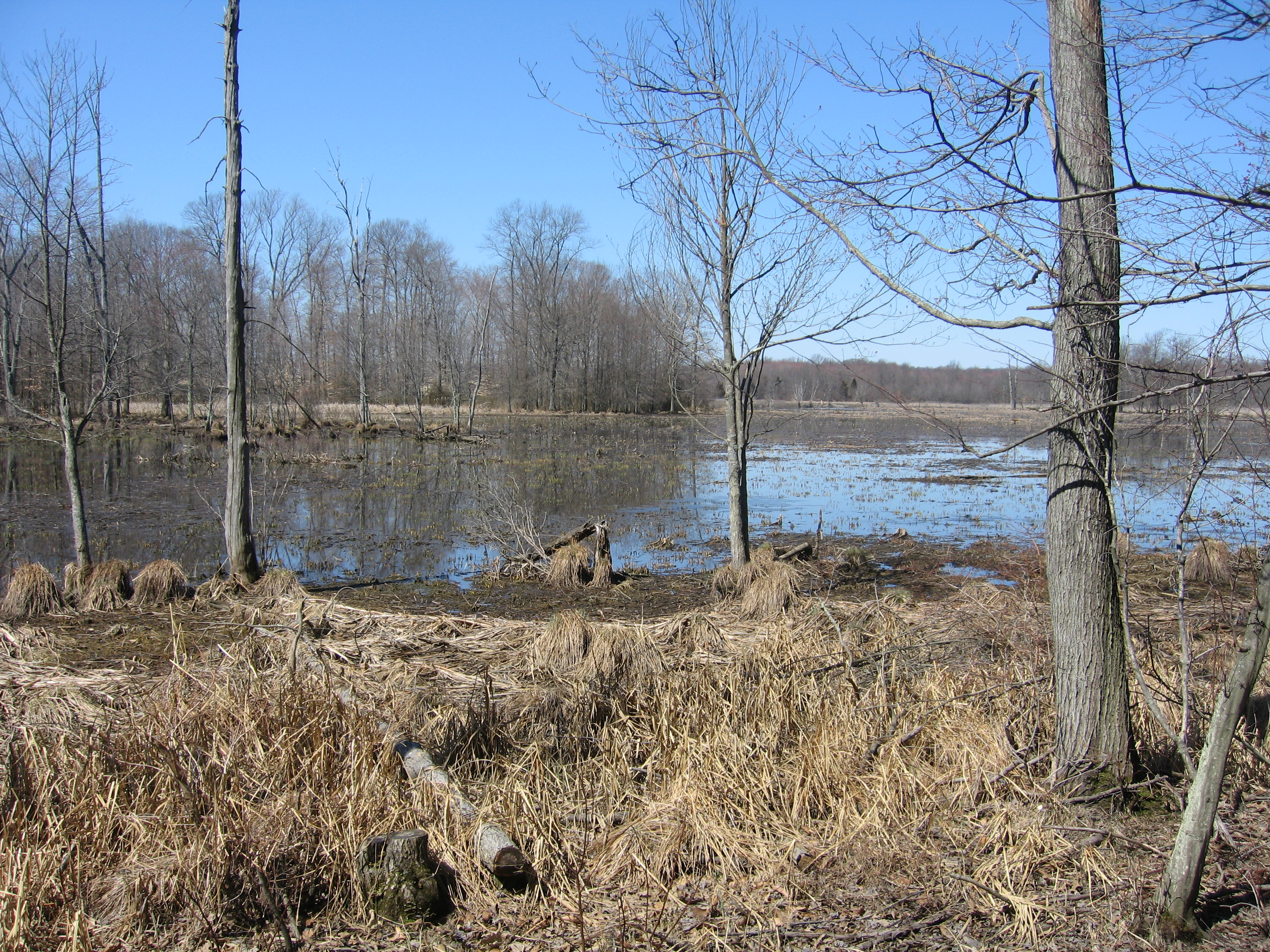
- Great Swamp National Wildlife Refuge in New Jersey (March 2008)

- Location within Morris County, New Jersey
- Location: Morris County, New Jersey, U.S.
- Nearest city: Morristown, New Jersey
- Coordinates: 40°42′30″N 74°28′00″W
- Area: 7,800 acres (32 km^{2})
- Established: 1960
- Governing body: U.S. Fish and Wildlife Service
- Website: Great Swamp National Wildlife Refuge

U.S. National Natural Landmark
- Designated: May 1966

The Great Swamp National Wildlife Refuge is located in Morris County, New Jersey, United States. Established in 1960, it is among what has grown to be 806 refuges in the United States National Wilderness Preservation System.

The first part of what was known in New Jersey as "The Great Swamp" that had been assembled in 1959 and was donated for perpetual preservation by the park service of the federal government in 1960, was declared a National Natural Landmark in May 1966. More land has been added several times. Its eastern half 3,660 acres (14.8 km^{2}) was designated as a wilderness area by Congress in 1968, making it the first wilderness area within the Fish and Wildlife Service. By 2010, the refuge included more than twelve square miles (7,800 acres or 32 square kilometers).

== Administration ==
The refuge is managed by the United States Fish and Wildlife Service, an agency within the United States Department of the Interior. Refuge lands lie within the townships of Chatham, Harding, and Long Hill.

== History ==
=== Geologic ===
The Great Swamp is the remnant of the bottom of the once-mighty Glacial Lake Passaic that approximately 15,000 to 11,000 years ago stretched across 30 by 10 miles (48 by 16 km) in what is presently northern New Jersey. The lake was formed by the melting waters of the retreating Wisconsin Glacier at the end of the last ice age. The glacier had pushed a moraine ahead of its advance, a rubble of soil and rocks that plugged the existing outlet for the waters that drained into the area of the watershed. As the retreating glacier melted, the waters rose to create the lake before a new outlet began to allow the water to exit at a much higher elevation.

The plug altered the course of the Passaic River, which had drained a swamp that predated the lake. A range of mountains to the west of Morristown formed the western boundary of the new lake and the most easterly line of the Watchung Mountains became the eastern boundary. The tops of some of the Watchung range became islands in the great lake. Water that had vented through the Watchung range, or to its south, found a new path that altered the old drainage paths. When the plug collapsed, the river still was forced to travel north through the range before finding a new outlet near present-day Paterson where it could manage the eastern turn toward the sea.

=== Early settlers ===
Some ten thousand years ago, Amerindians arrived in the area and established settlements shortly after the retreat of the glacier, hunting, fishing, and farming. In 1614, Dutch colonists claimed part of the area as New Netherlands and they traded with the natives. Later, British settlers came, establishing dominion over what they called the Province of New Jersey.

The refuge includes about one-quarter of the Great Swamp 55-square-mile (140 km^{2}) watershed that gives rise to the Passaic River. The watershed touches ten modern communities, many of which were settled by European colonists long before the American Revolution.

=== Wildlife refuge formation ===
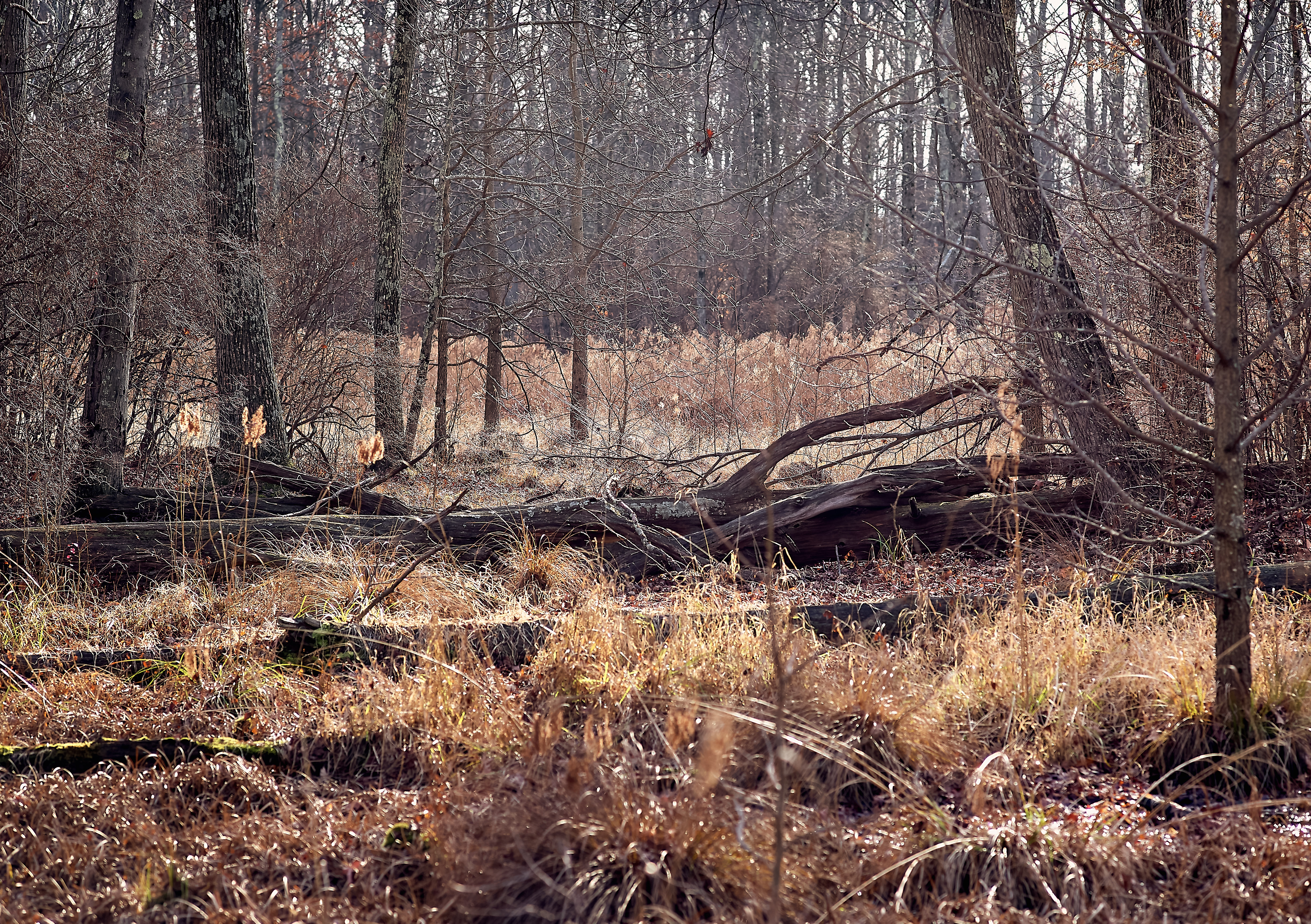
Great Swamp National Wildlife Refuge, December

The land that would become the Great Swamp National Wildlife Refuge was established by an Act of Congress on November 3, 1960, after a multi-year legal battle that pitted local residents against Port Authority of New York and New Jersey officials wishing to turn the Great Swamp into a major regional airport to supplement Newark Airport's ability to accommodate large jet aircraft.

The Jersey Jetport Site Association was the first to form in opposition. Their efforts to prevent the development of an airport in the swamp became public knowledge on December 3, 1959, when four of its members (Kafi Benz, Joan Kelly, Esty Weiss, and Betty White) were expelled from a meeting at the Essex House in Newark that had been organized to generate support for its construction. The JJSA activity was followed closely by a national and influential sister organization, when (because of connections with Marcellus Hartley Dodge, Sr., a major donor to and participant in JJSA) the North American Wildlife Foundation established its Great Swamp Committee in 1960. Between the two organizations and, in less than a year, enough property in the core of the swamp was quickly purchased, assembled, and donated to the federal government to qualify for perpetual protection as a national wildlife refuge. As the representative from Arizona, Stewart Udall immediately championed the efforts of these residents, whom he described as having mounted the greatest effort ever made by residents in America to protect a natural habitat, and later, on May 29, 1964, as the Secretary of the Interior, he oversaw its dedication as a refuge. The initial donation was 2,600 acres (11 km^{2}), which assured its protection as a refuge and the acquisition of additional lands continued. In 1960, Representative Peter Frelinghuysen, Jr., whose estate was in the area targeted for development also joined the effort.

== Description ==
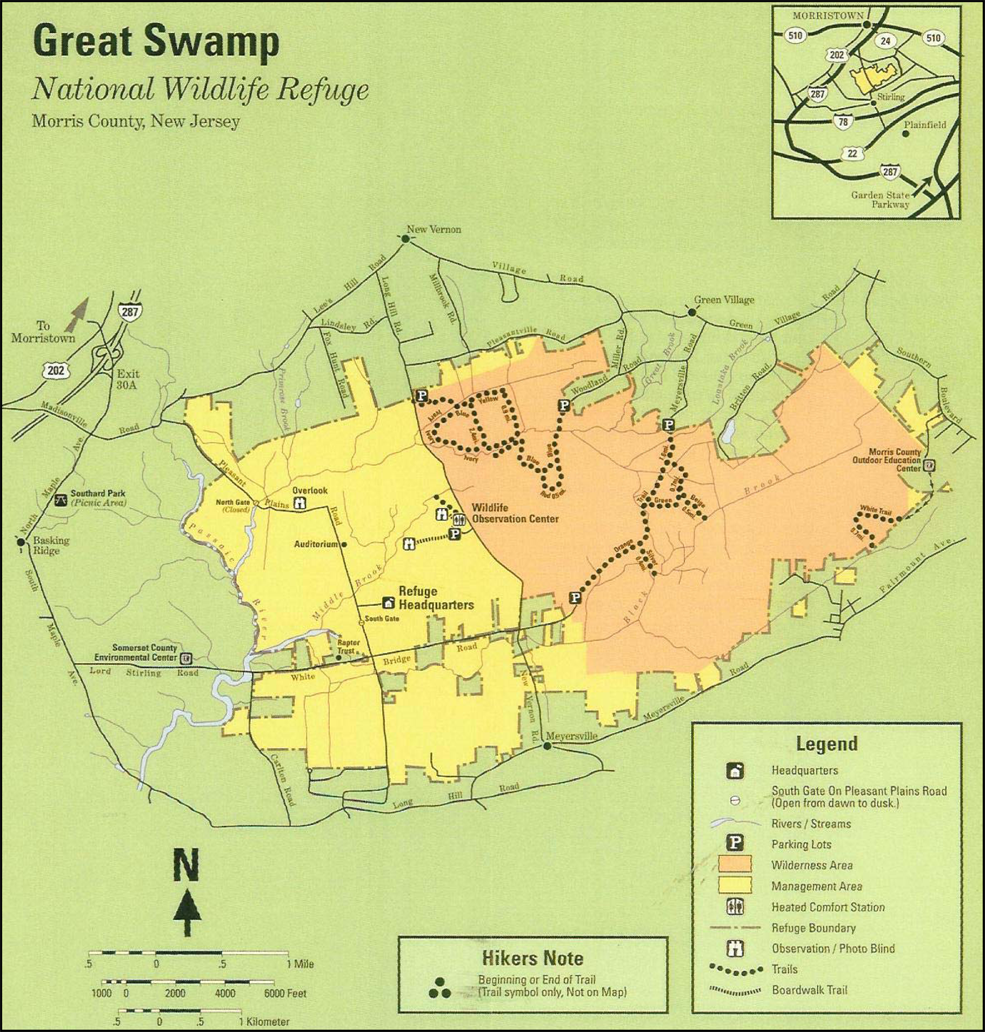
Map of the Great Swamp National Wildlife Refuge

By the end of 2010, the extent of the Great Swamp National Wildlife Refuge had grown to nearly 7,800 acres (32 km^{2}) of varied habitats. It lies within the Northeastern coastal forests ecoregion. When the remainder of the area donated was dedicated on September 9, 1968, it was the first refuge to receive wilderness designation.

The Great Swamp is a migration-resting and feeding area or a permanent habitat for more than 244 species of birds. The major routes of birds migrating along the eastern portion of the United States follow the corridor that includes the Great Swamp as an important stopping place for rest and nutrition.

Many species of birds reside permanently in the watershed. Deer, fish, fox, frogs, muskrat, raccoons, snakes, turtles, as well as many insects and a wide variety of wildflowers and plants call the refuge home. Some of the animals hunted by the prehistoric native inhabitants and colonists, such as bear and beaver, are encountered occasionally. Its role in draining the region and absorbing flood water for gradual release can be critical during extreme weather conditions. The refuge also plays an important role in improving water quality by acting as a natural ecological filter trapping sediments and contaminants.

== Related organizations ==
Numerous nonprofit organizations have arisen from the communities within the Great Swamp watershed and work closely in partnership with the refuge. The Great Swamp Watershed Association, founded in 1981, works to protect the entire 55-square-mile (140 km^{2}) watershed that surrounds the swamp. Within the Great Swamp there also is a nonprofit bird-rehabilitation center founded in 1977, called The Raptor Trust, mainly specializing in birds of prey, such as eagles, hawks, and owls. Lord Stirling Park is part of the Somerset County Park System. The park is entered from the community of Stirling that is named after a military officer of the American Revolution who lived in the community, William Alexander. The park is located immediately adjacent to the southwestern boundary of the refuge on the western side of the Passaic River. The park offers excellent hiking facilities that include trails, boardwalks, observation blinds, and naturalist exhibits displayed in its park office that are related to the swamp and its wildlife.

The Morris County Park Commission manages parks in the vicinity of the Great Swamp National Wildlife Reserve, including the Great Swamp Outdoor Education Center.

== Gallery ==
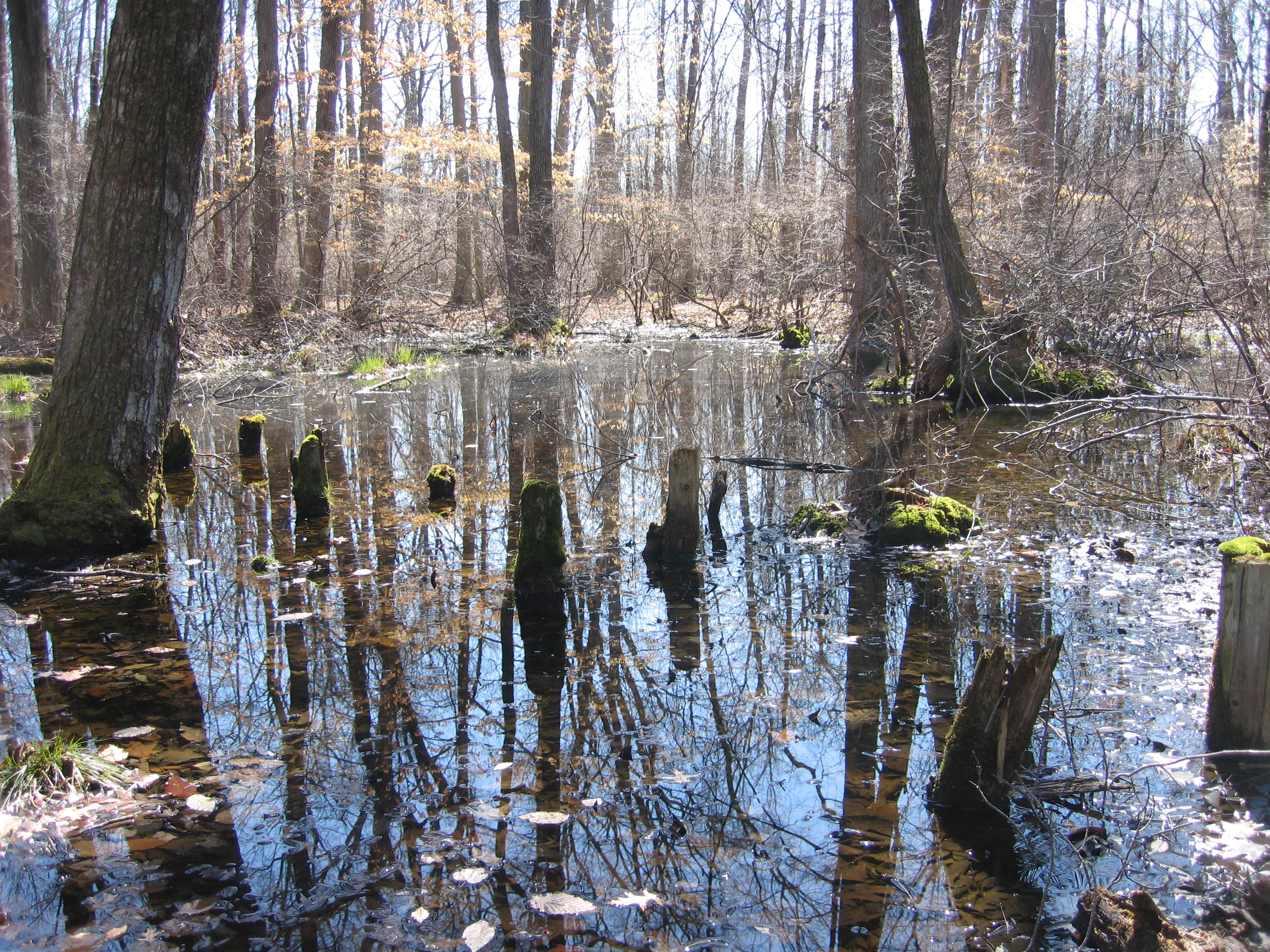
Winter scene

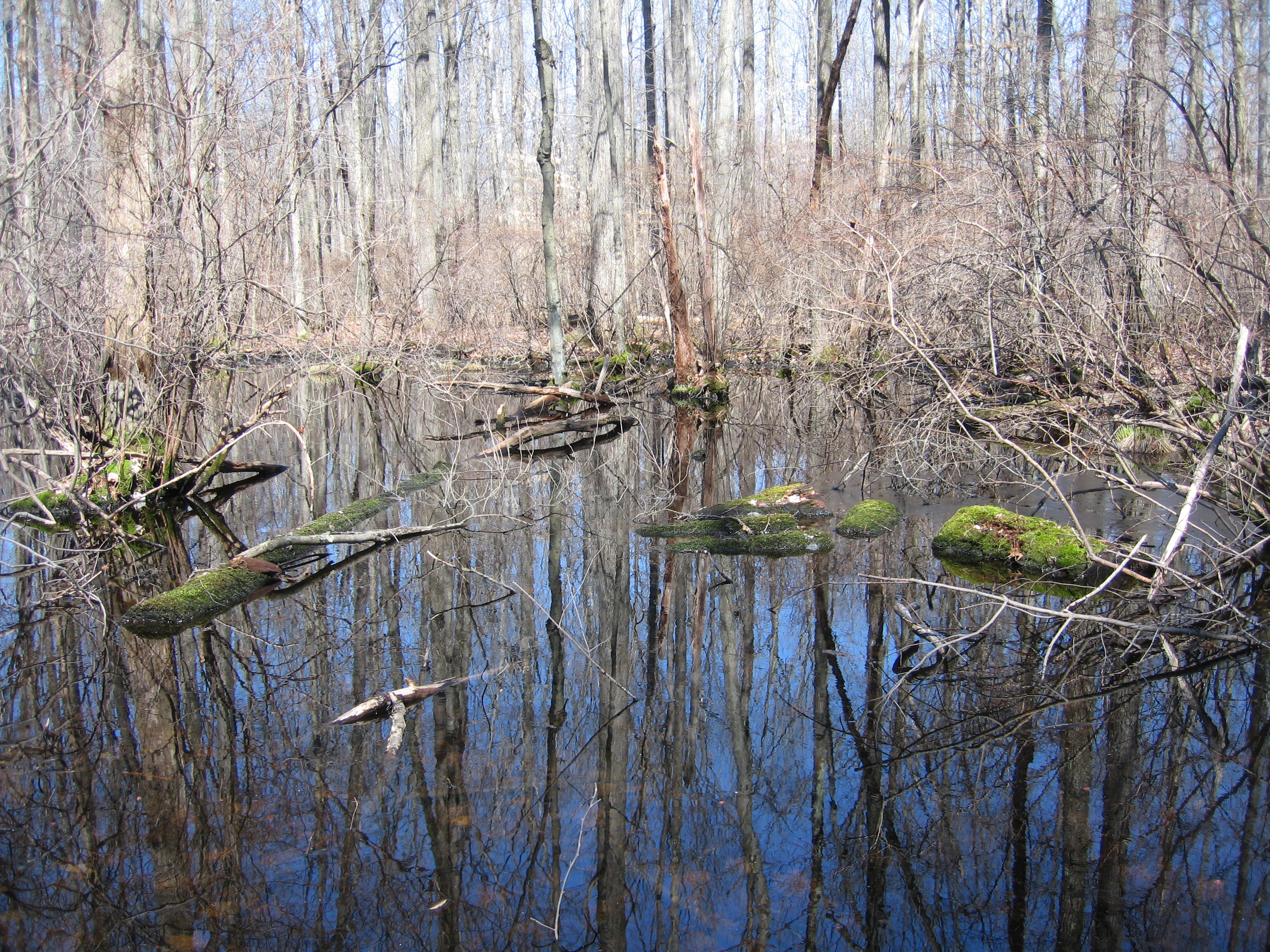
Winter scene

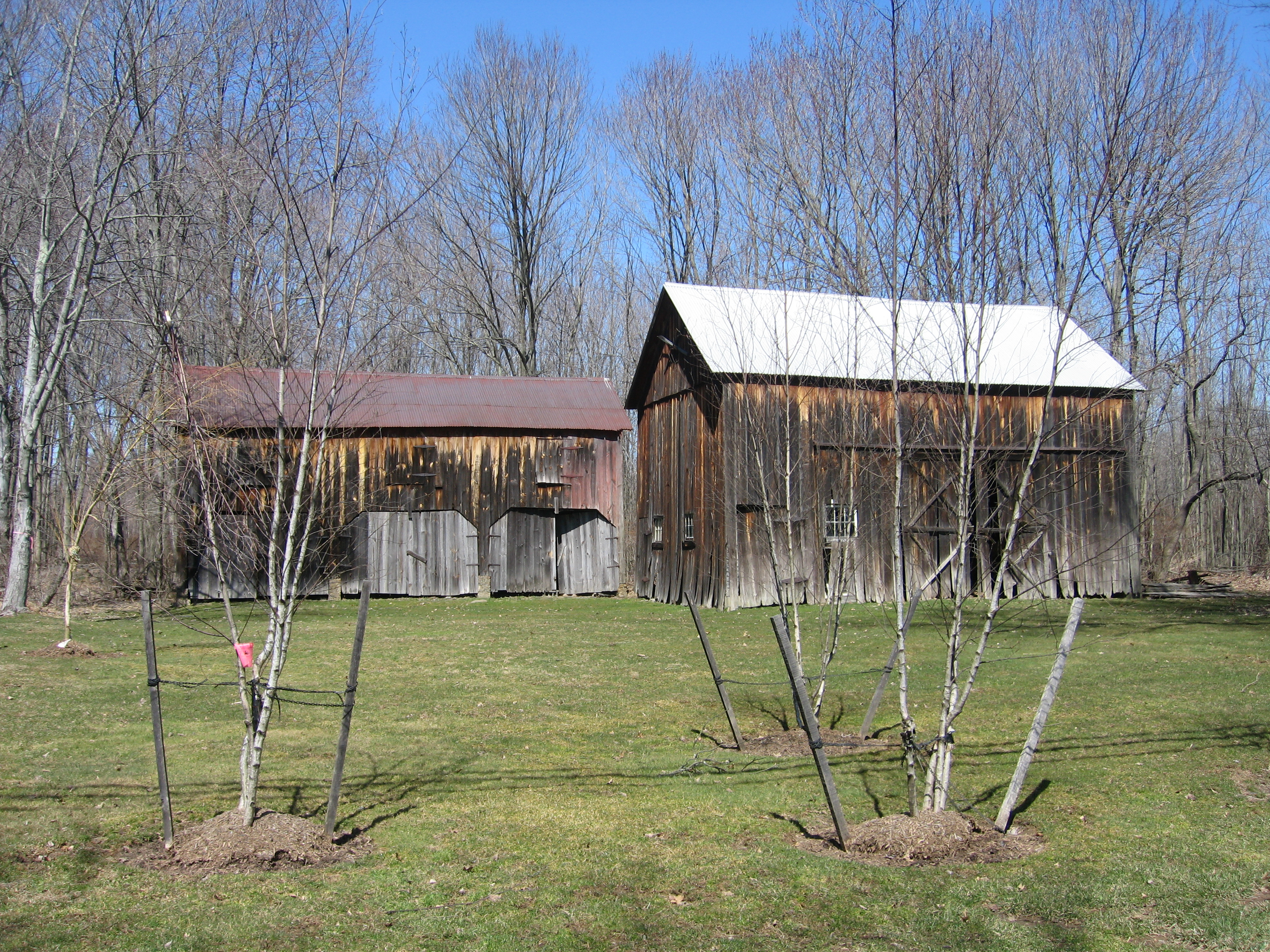
Barns in winter

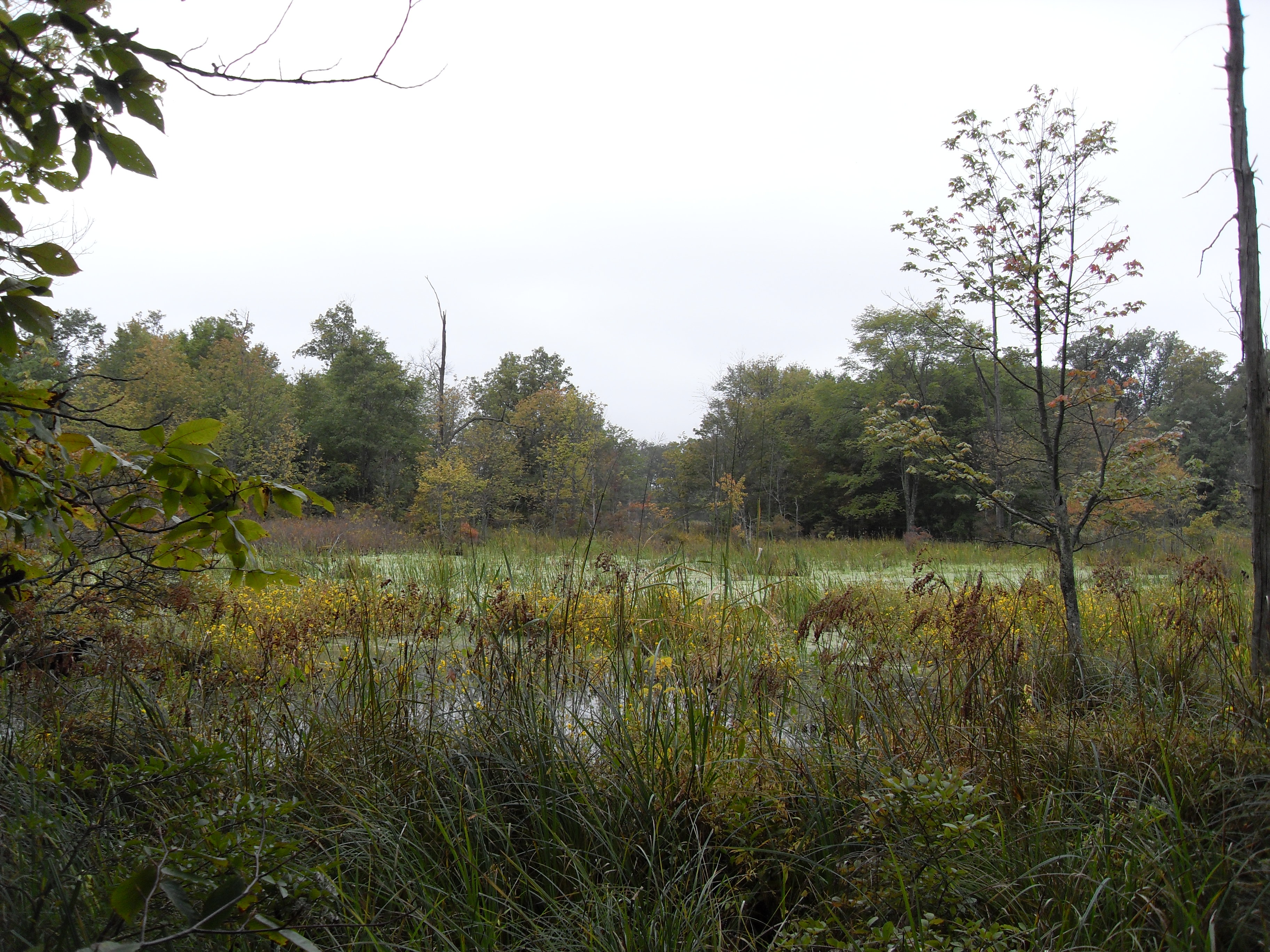
Fall scene

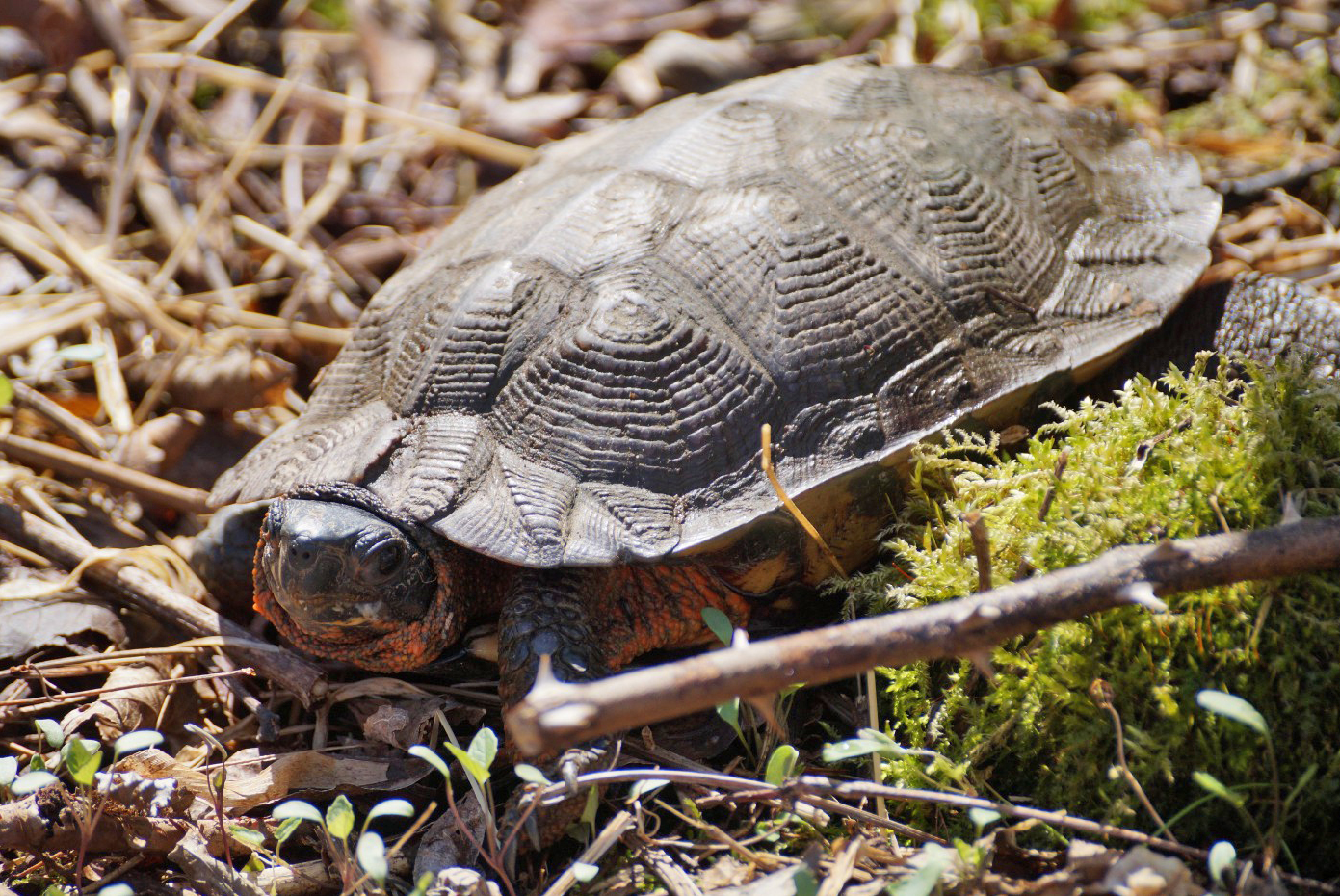
An adult female wood turtle in the refuge on April 28, 2022.
