= Saltus =

Saltus may refer to:

== People ==
- Edgar Saltus (1855–1921), American writer known for his highly refined prose style
- Francis Saltus Saltus (1849–1889), American poet
- Thomas Saltus Lubbock (1817–1862), Texas Ranger and soldier in the Confederate army during the American Civil War

== Latin ==
- The Latin word saltus (pl. saltūs) meaning "leap," as in:
  - Natura non facit saltus ("nature does not make jumps"), a principle of natural philosophy; hence in scientific usage:
    - Saltation (biology)
    - Saltation (geology)
    - Saltatory conduction
  - Saltus lunae, a "leap of the moon" in Christian calendar computation; see computus
  - See also Sault, a pre-17th century French form meaning "falls" derived from Latin saltus, found in many place names
- Saltus meaning "wooded area" or "wilderness," as in:
  - Saltus Teutoburgiensis or Teutoburg Forest
  - Hercynius saltus, one of the Latin names for the Hercynian Forest
  - Carbonarius saltus or Silva Carbonaria, the "charcoal forest" in Belgium
  - Saltus Vasconum, a Roman term for territory inhabited by the Vascones or ancient Basques
  - Saltus Tariotarum; see Tariotes
- Saltus, a unit of area equal to about 200 ha or 500 acres; see Ancient Roman units of measurement § Area

== Places, schools, and businesses ==
- Saltus, a Byzantine name for Salt, Jordan
- Saltus, California, a town in San Bernardino County, California
- Saltus Grammar School, in Pembroke Parish, Bermuda
- Saltus Island, an island of Bermuda
- Saltus Grocery Store, in Burlington, Vermont

== Zoology ==
- Amblyseius saltus, a species of mite in the family Amblyseius
- Lysiteles saltus, a species of spider in the genus Lysiteles
- Aprostocetus saltus, a species of insect in the genus Aprostocetus

== Other ==
- Saltus Award, awarded by the American Numismatic Society; see List of Saltus Award winners
- A type of wrench
