= Robertson Kirtland Mygatt =

American painter

- Born: October 12, 1861; New York, New York
- Died: December 19, 1919 (aged 58); New York, New York
- Education: Art Students League, New York; Europe
- Known for: Painting, Etching
- Movement: Tonalism

Robertson K. Mygatt or 'R.K.', (1861–1919) was an American landscape painter and etcher working at the turn of the 20th century. He is often associated with the Tonalist movement which was being experimented with in painting during most of his active years, having emerged as a movement in the 1880s that continued through about 1915. R. K. Mygatt was born in New York City in 1861, where he studied at the Art Students League of New York with noted landscape artist John Henry Twachtman and American impressionist painter William Merritt Chase. He also studied painting in Europe.

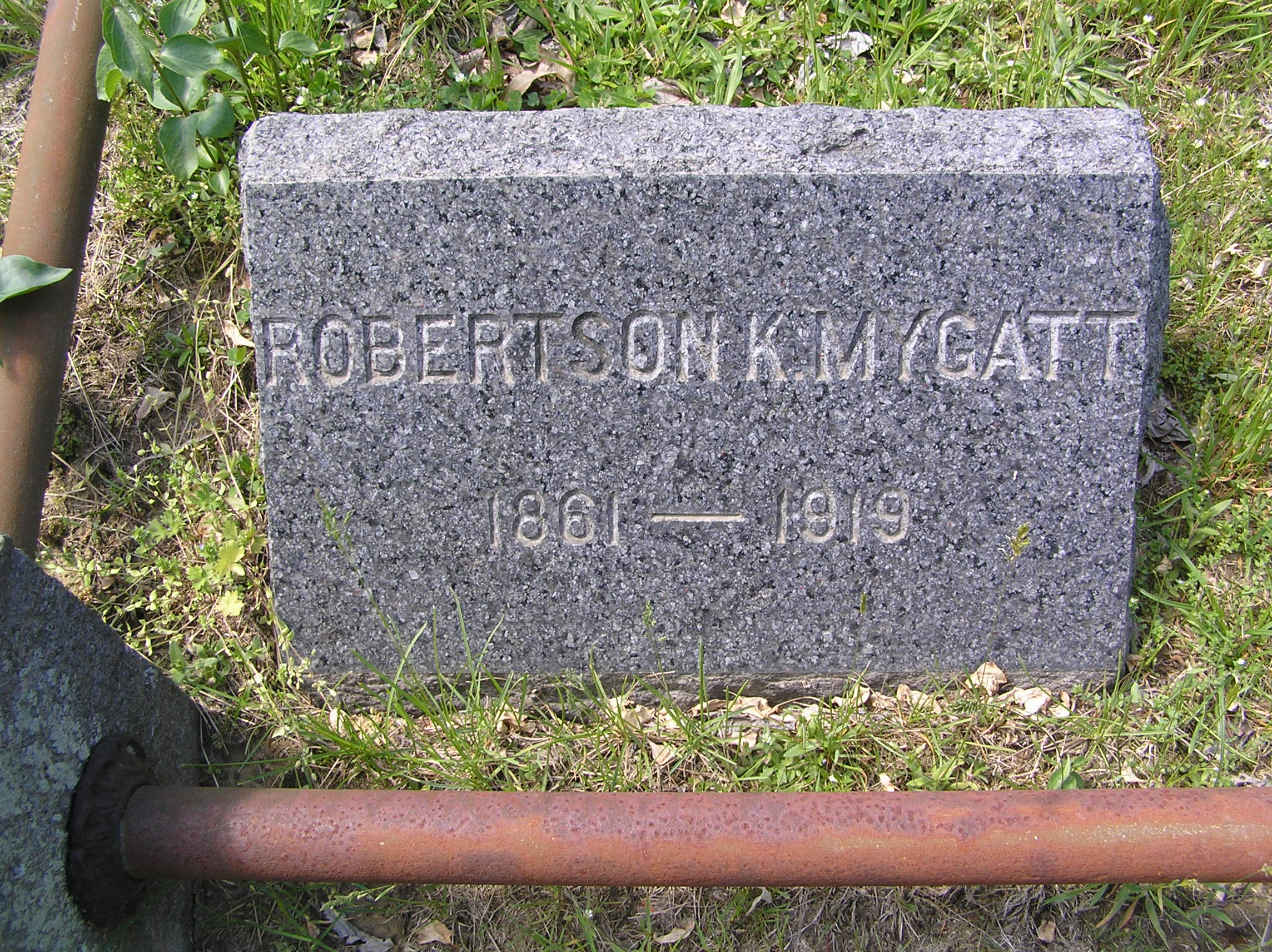
The gravesite of Robertson Mygatt

Mygatt specialized in painting landscapes and much of his works could be categorized as impressionism falling under the 'Tonalist' style. Tonalism emerged in the 1880s, and he was clearly influenced by the trend. Mygatt was also a competent etcher, but his focus throughout his career was most certainly oil painting. He exhibited at the Pennsylvania Academy of Fine Arts, The Art Institute of Chicago, the National Academy of Design, the Society of American Artists and the Salmagundi Club in New York City. One of his works was included in the Louisiana Purchase Exhibition in St. Louis in 1904, for which he was awarded a silver medal.

For nearly fifty nears after his death, his heirs did not circulate his work at all. It was not until the mid-1960s that many of them became available for sale for the first time after the last of his direct descendants died. As art historians, the gallery world and the public have become more familiar with Robertson Kirtland Mygatt's work, he has grown in popularity.

Mygatt resided in Ridgefield, Connecticut, before dying in 1919 at 58 years old in New York City. He is buried in Sleepy Hollow Cemetery in Westchester County, New York.

== Sources ==
- The Poetic Impulse: Robertson Kirtland Mygatt, an exhibition pamphlet published by the Schwartz Gallery, Philadelphia, PA.
- Ask Art, The Artist Bluebook at Askart.com: "Robertson Kirtland Mygatt"
- Raynor, Vivien (June 30, 1991). "Celebrating a Little-Known Artist". The New York Times.
