= Sleepy Hollow Cemetery =

Cemetery in Westchester County, New York, US

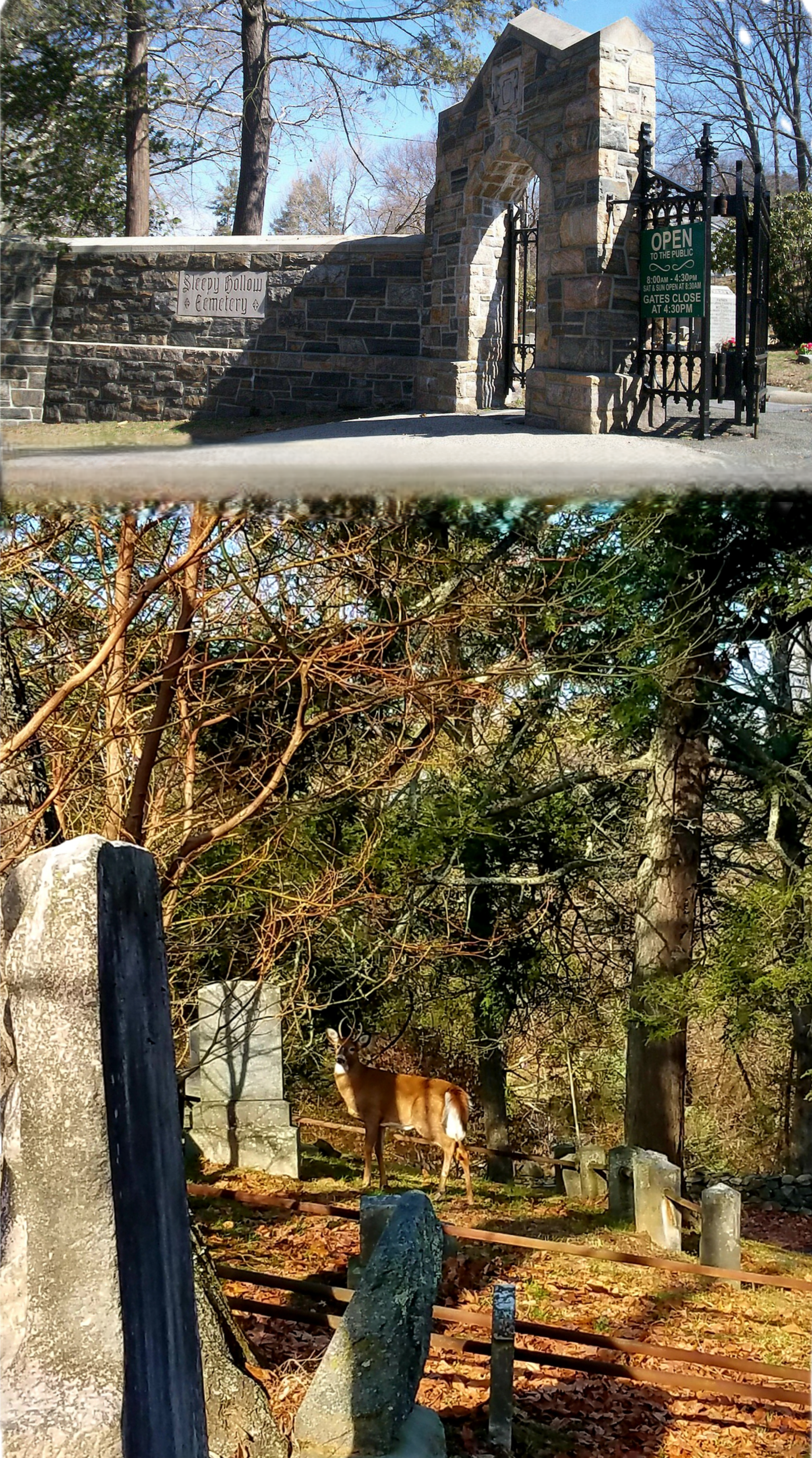
- Top: main entrance to Sleepy Hollow Cemetery; bottom: park-like setting in the old part of the cemetery
- Interactive map of Sleepy Hollow Cemetery

Details
- Established: 1849
- Location: 540 N. Broadway, Sleepy Hollow, New York, US
- Coordinates: 41°05′48″N 73°51′41″W
- Size: 90 acres (36 ha)
- No. of interments: approx. 47,000 (2025 data)
- Website: Official website
- The Political Graveyard: Sleepy Hollow Cemetery
- Sleepy Hollow Cemetery
- U.S. National Register of Historic Places
- U.S. Historic district
- Location within New York
- Area: approx. 85 acres (34 ha)
- NRHP reference No.: 09000380
- Added to NRHP: June 3, 2009

Sleepy Hollow Cemetery in Sleepy Hollow, New York, United States, is a non-profit, non-sectarian burying ground of about 90 acres (36 ha). It is the final resting place of numerous famous figures, including Washington Irving, who was a cofounder of the establishment. Incorporated in 1849 as Tarrytown Cemetery, it was renamed Sleepy Hollow Cemetery in 1865.

The cemetery is contiguous with, but separate from, the Burial Ground of the Old Dutch Church of Sleepy Hollow, which was a setting for Washington Irving's famous story, The Legend of Sleepy Hollow. The Rockefeller family estate, Kykuit, whose grounds abut Sleepy Hollow Cemetery, contains the private Rockefeller cemetery, which is located behind a high fence at the north end of Sleepy Hollow Cemetery.

Sleepy Hollow Cemetery was listed on the National Register of Historic Places in 2009.

== History and design ==
In 1847, the New York State Legislature passed the Rural Cemetery Act, which authorized commercial burial grounds in New York. The law led to the burial of human remains becoming a commercial business for the first time, replacing the practice of burying the dead in churchyards or on private farmland. Almost immediately after that, a group of prominent local residents, headed by author Washington Irving and Capt. Jacob Storm initiated the building of a modern burial ground in the Tarrytown area, as the Burying Ground at the Old Dutch Church no longer had adequate burial space for the growing community. Tarrytown Cemetery was incorporated on October 29, 1849. On April 11, 1865, it would be officially renamed Sleepy Hollow Cemetery—the name on which Washington Irving had insisted from the beginning, but was initially overruled. The new cemetery began with 39 acres north of the church graveyard, subsequently growing by about 41 acres in 1886 and an additional 10 acres in 1890.

It was designed as a garden—or rural—cemetery, a style that was popular in the United States and Europe during the mid-19th century. (Washington Irving was a strong proponent of the garden cemetery movement.) Jim Logan, superintendent of Sleepy Hollow Cemetery, writes on his website, Sleepy Hollow Country: "Think of it as the Victorian version of therapeutic landscape architecture—a place where grief could unfold amid natural beauty rather than urban gloom."

The building of this type of cemetery involved well-planned walkways and elaborately landscaped plantings of trees and shrubs. The Tarrytown/Sleepy Hollow area, with its rolling hills, old-growth trees, and the gently flowing Pocantico River, was a perfect location for a garden cemetery. Before the widespread development of public parks, Sleepy Hollow Cemetery, like other garden cemeteries, provided a place for the public to enjoy outdoor recreation in a park-like setting. In the 21st century, it is still a popular spot for locals to take a nature walk.

Names of prominent local families are found on stone-fronted family vaults built into the hillsides in the older section of the cemetery, but most of the burials are family plots with multiple tombstones. In the northern section, on the higher elevations, there are numerous mausoleums and large plots with elaborate monuments of "many New York achievers" of the Gilded Age.

The cemetery's historic Hillside Receiving Vault provided essential "cold storage" before the advent of modern steam shovels and backhoes. Built directly into a steep hillside, the solid masonry structure used the earth's natural insulation to hold bodies when the ground was too frozen for burial. It is a contributing structure to the cemetery's 2009 listing on the National Register of Historic Places. The vault gained international fame as the crypt of Barnabas Collins in the 1970 film House of Dark Shadows. No longer used for mass winter storage, it is part of official cemetery tours.

Purported "Headless Horseman" cemetery bridge. A popular feature is the cemetery’s rustic bridge over a Pocantico River ravine, near a small waterfall and the river’s natural Cascade Pool. Cemetery superintendent Jim Logan writes: "Visitors have long associated it with the famous bridge from Irving’s tale, though it’s a much later addition to the landscape. Still, there’s something fitting about it—a wooden span over running water, framed by autumn foliage, that captures the atmosphere of Irving’s story even if it wasn’t part of his original inspiration."

== Notable monuments ==
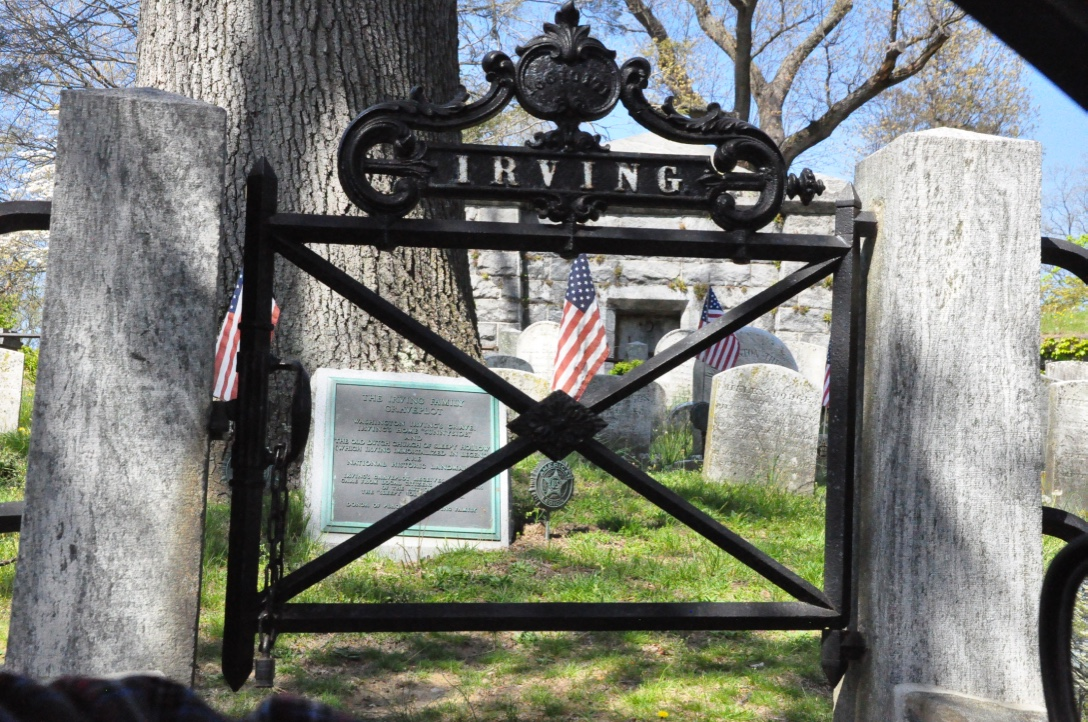
The Irving family plot

The modest Washington Irving's gravestone (1859) is located in the Irving family plot, where his parents, brothers (including Peter Irving), nephews, and nieces are also buried. According to his nephew and literary assistant, Pierre Munroe Irving, the author had selected the specific place next to his mother when visiting the cemetery several days before his death. Creating a unique literary landmark, the author is buried close to the historic Burying Ground of the Old Dutch Church of Sleepy Hollow, where the graves of people who inspired The Legend of Sleepy Hollow characters are located.

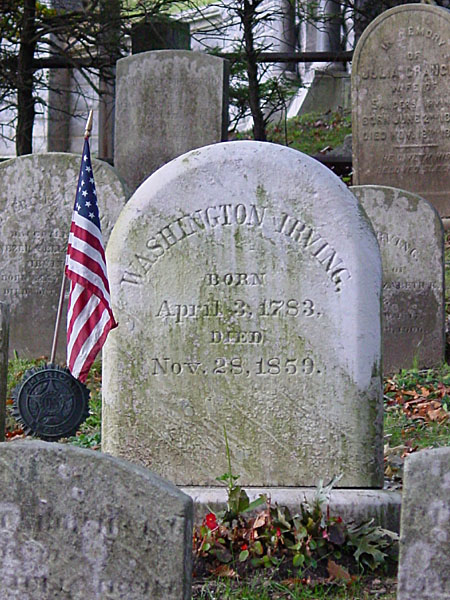
Headstone of Washington Irving

The 1926 gravestone index, The Old Dutch Burying Ground of Sleepy Hollow, describes it as follows:

On the Northern edge of the burying ground, overlooking his beloved .... Hollow, rest the remains of the gentle Washington Irving: the shrine of thousands of pilgrims from the distant places of the earth. Marked by no tawdry memorial of elaborate sculpture, a simple marble slab indicates the grave; a slab ingeniously fashioned, with rounded comers and edges designed to foil souvenir collectors who have carried off piece-meal two earlier stones.

While earlier grave decorations in the Old Dutch Burying Ground were carved from sandstone, Irving’s gravestone was made from white marble. It became the preferred material for Neoclassical architecture and decoration of the post-Revolutionary period, chosen for its association with the purity and idealized forms of ancient Greek and Roman art. Marble, however, proved to be a rather poor choice for exterior monuments: originally smooth and glistening, marble surfaces soften with time and become rough, grainy, and discolored. Also, like sandstone, marble is easy to chip. In the late 19th and early 20th centuries, it was a common, though destructive, practice for tourists to chip off small pieces of sandstone and marble grave markers of famous people as souvenirs. The Irving gravestone that people see today is the third iteration of the original grave marker; as mentioned above, souvenir hunters chipped away at previous ones, which eventually had to be replaced. (By the end of the 19th century, newly developed power tools would make it practicable to carve gravestones and monuments out of durable granite.)

Irving's gravestone is the most visited place in the cemetery. In the words of the New York Supreme Court justice Isaac N. Mills:

Sleepy Hollow... The genius of Irving, whose remains, at his own request, rest within her soil, that sweet and gentle Father of American Literature, has made her name known and loved, as far and as widely as the English tongue is spoken.

=== Gallery ===
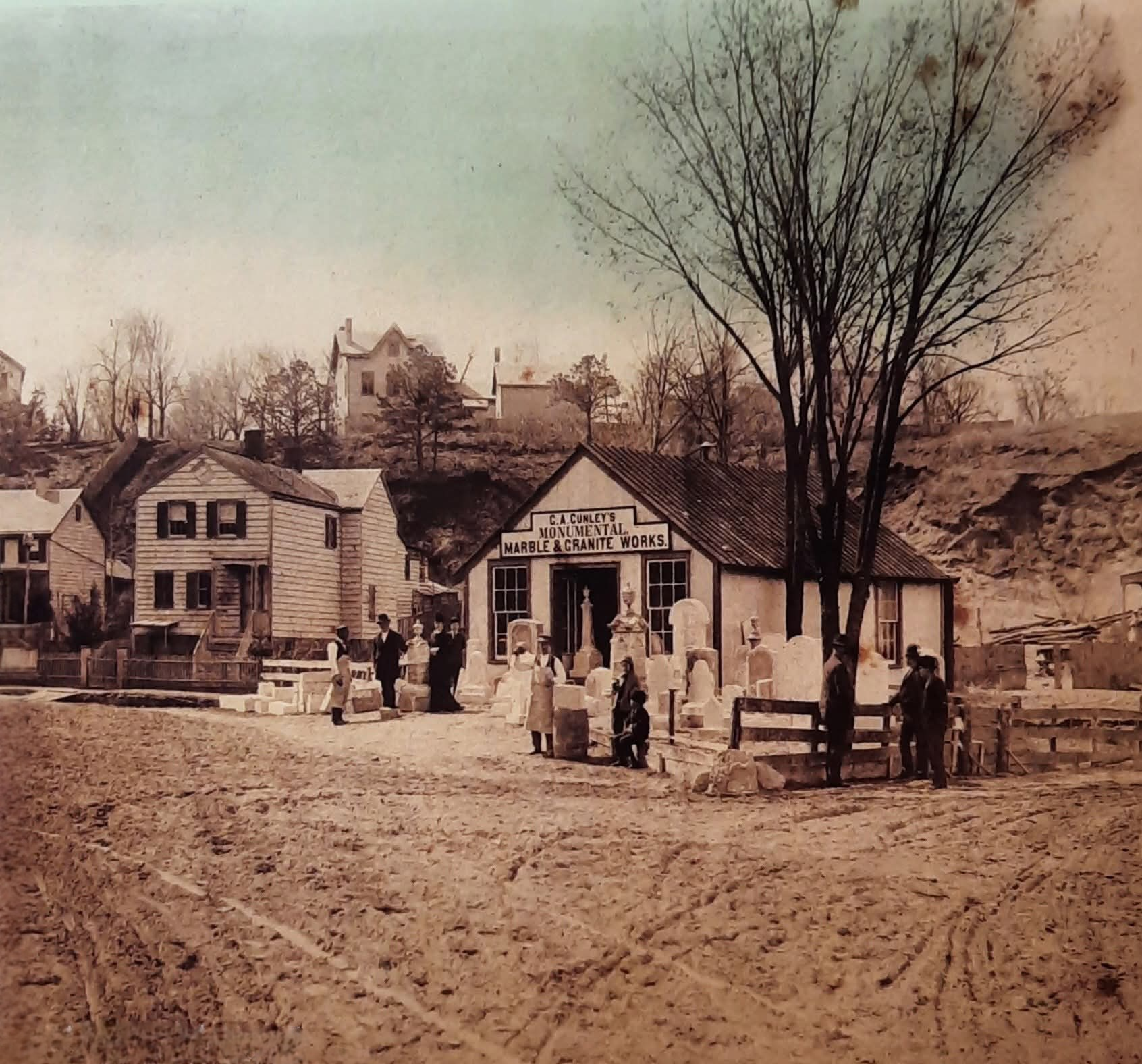
Monumental Granite and Marble Works in North Tarrytown (now Sleepy Hollow) that made tombstones for the cemetery (late 1800s)

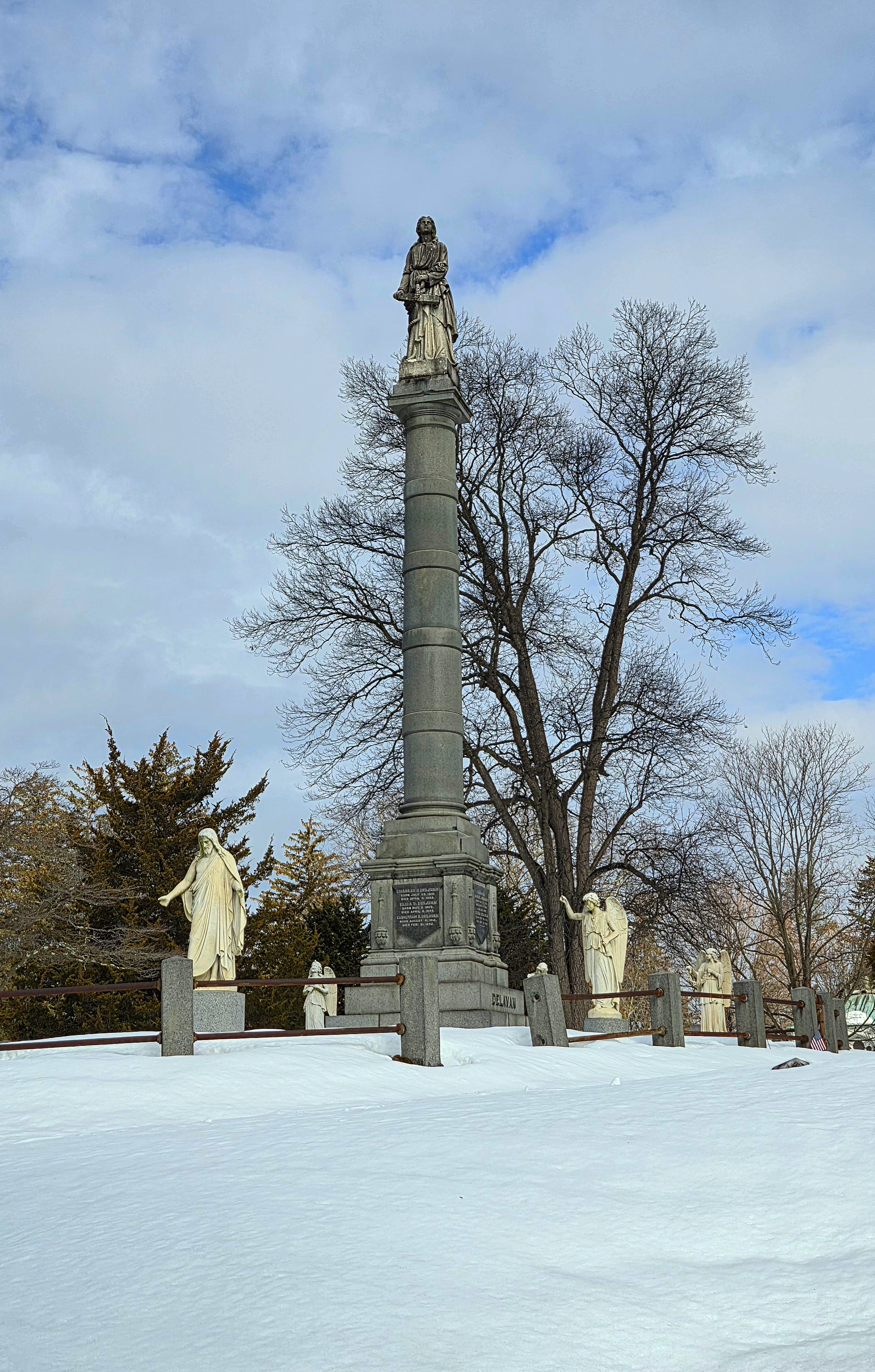
Delavan Monument (1871)

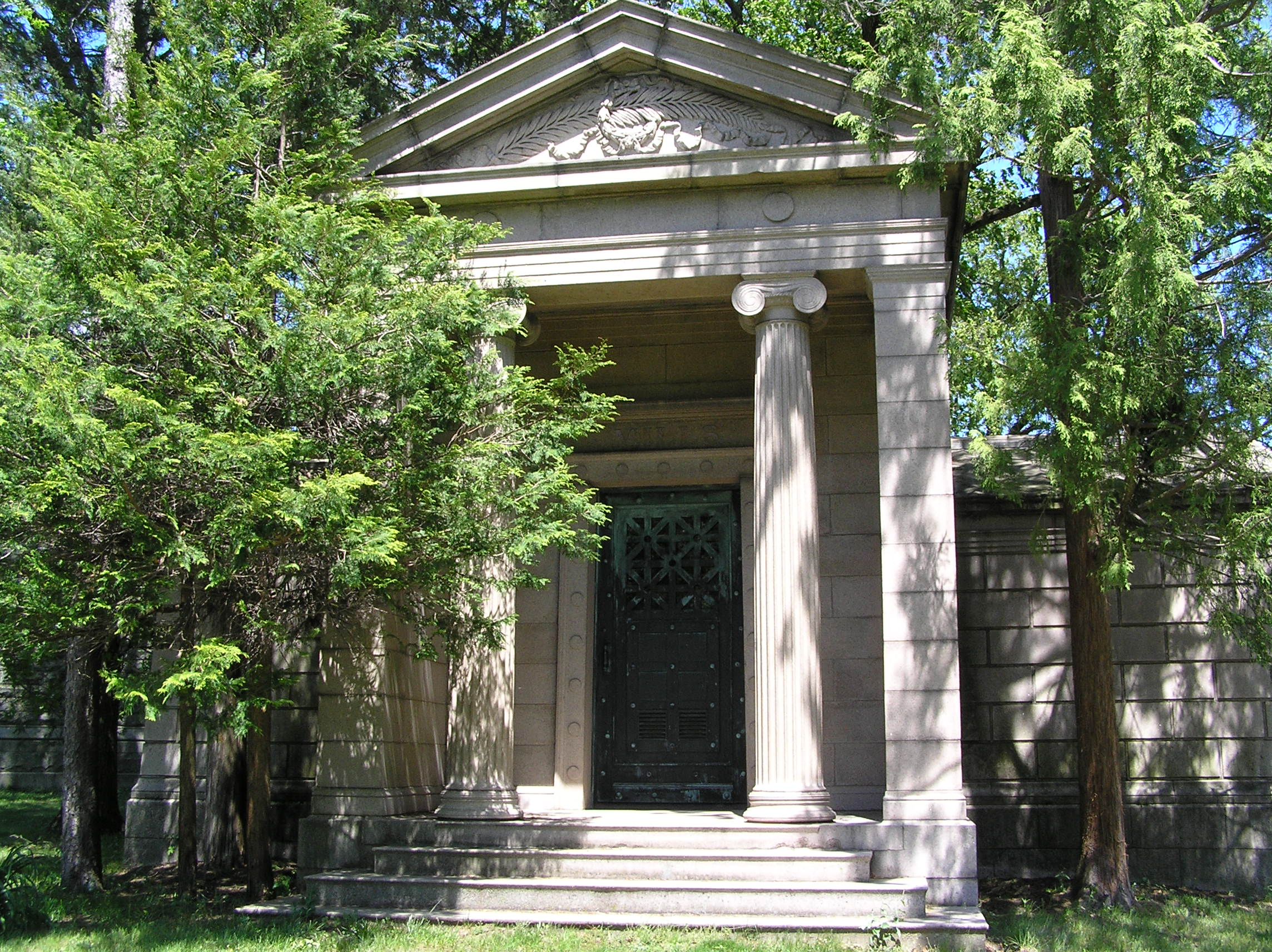
Darius Ogden Mills Mausoleum (1883)

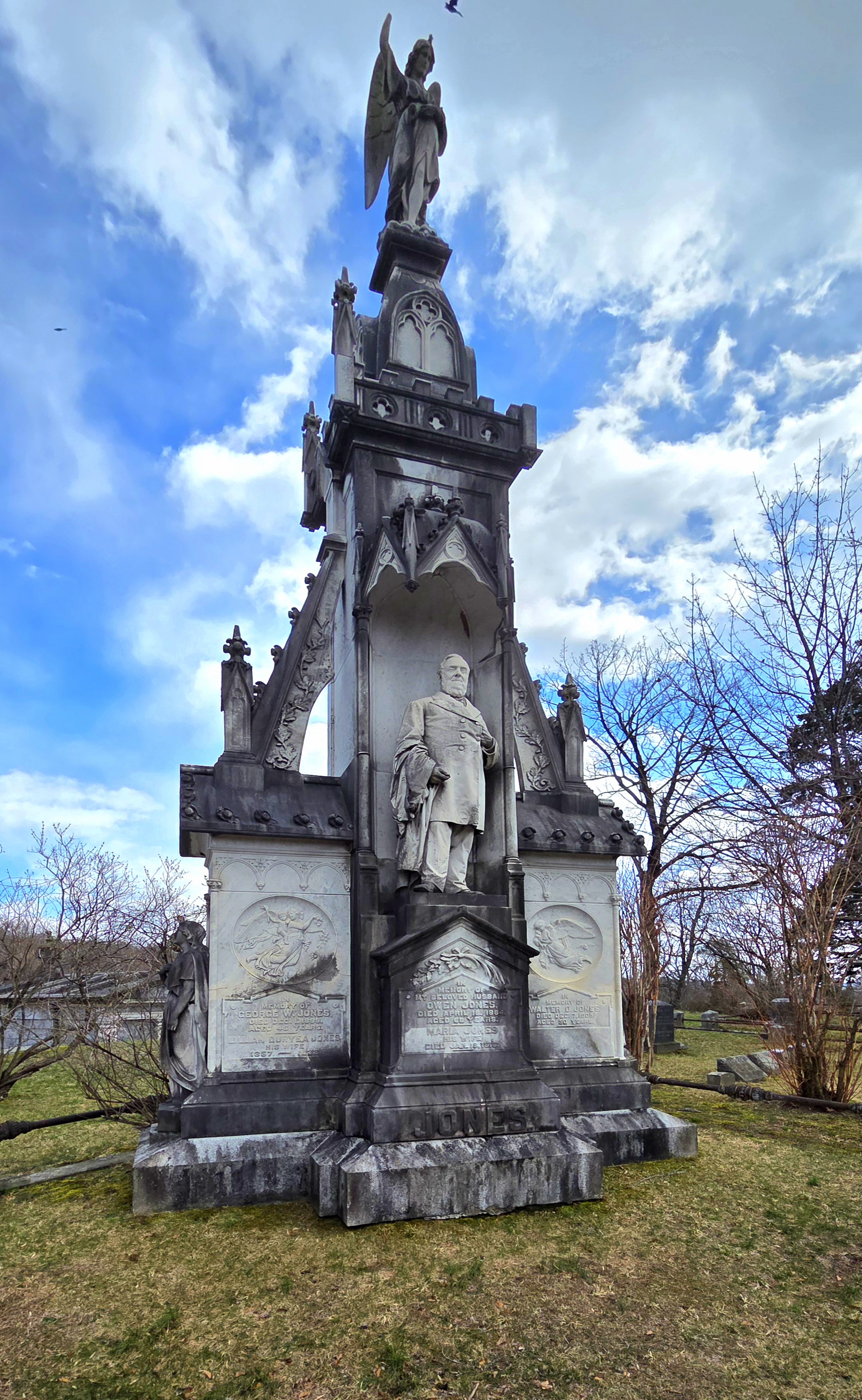
Owen Jones Monument (1884)

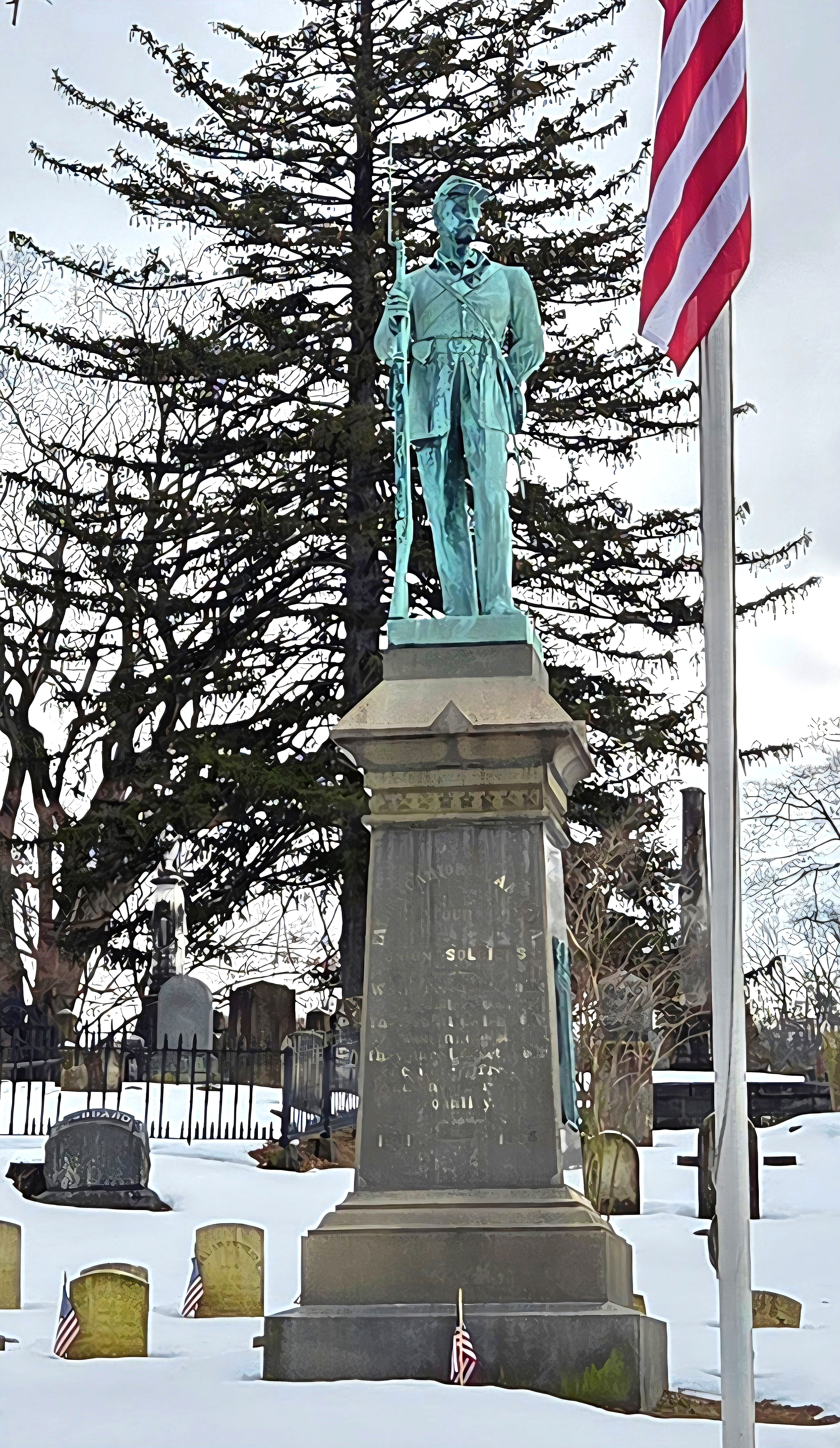
Civil War Soldiers Monument (1890)

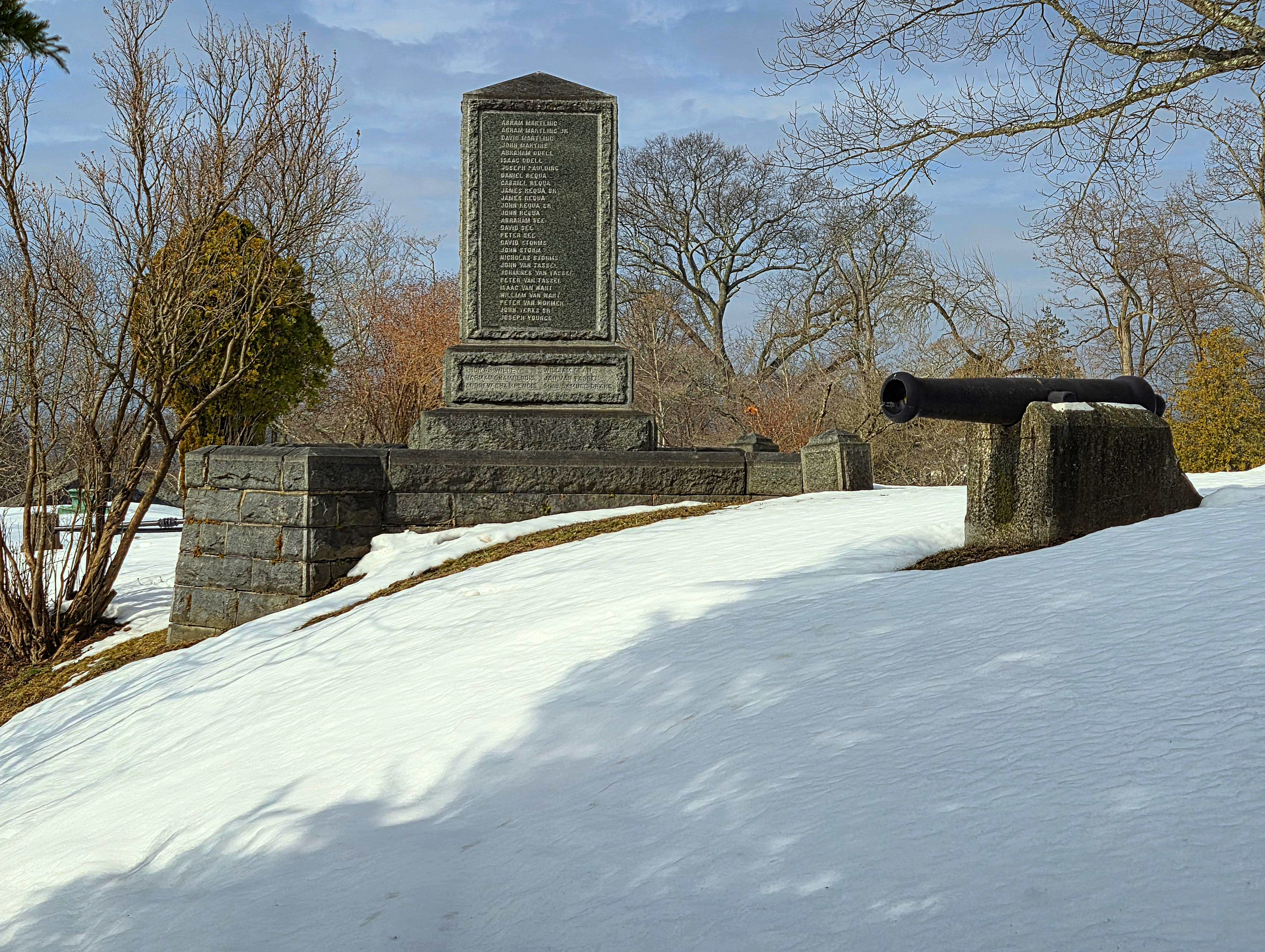
Revolutionary Soldiers' Monument (1894)

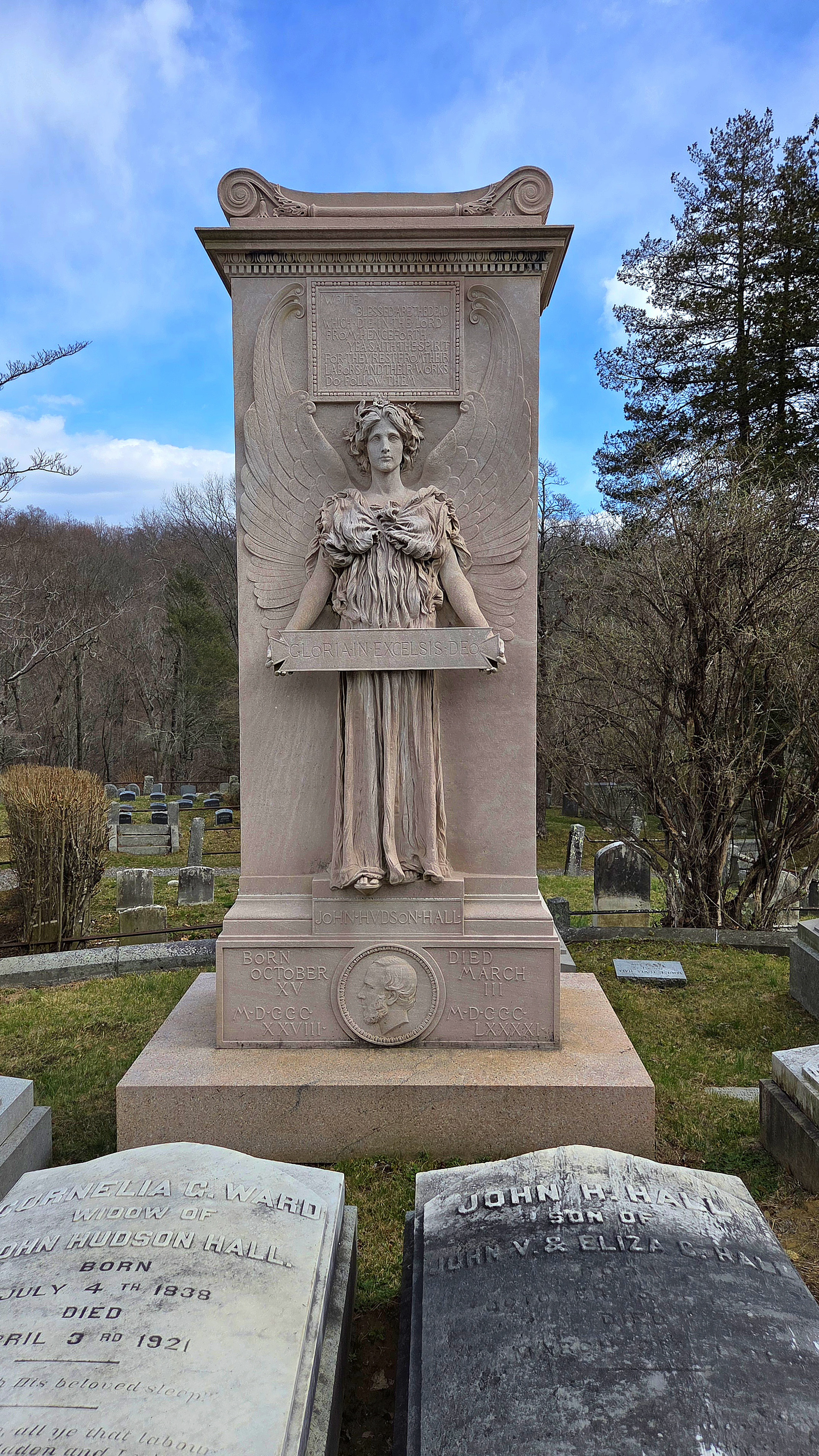
John Hudson Hall Monument (1894)

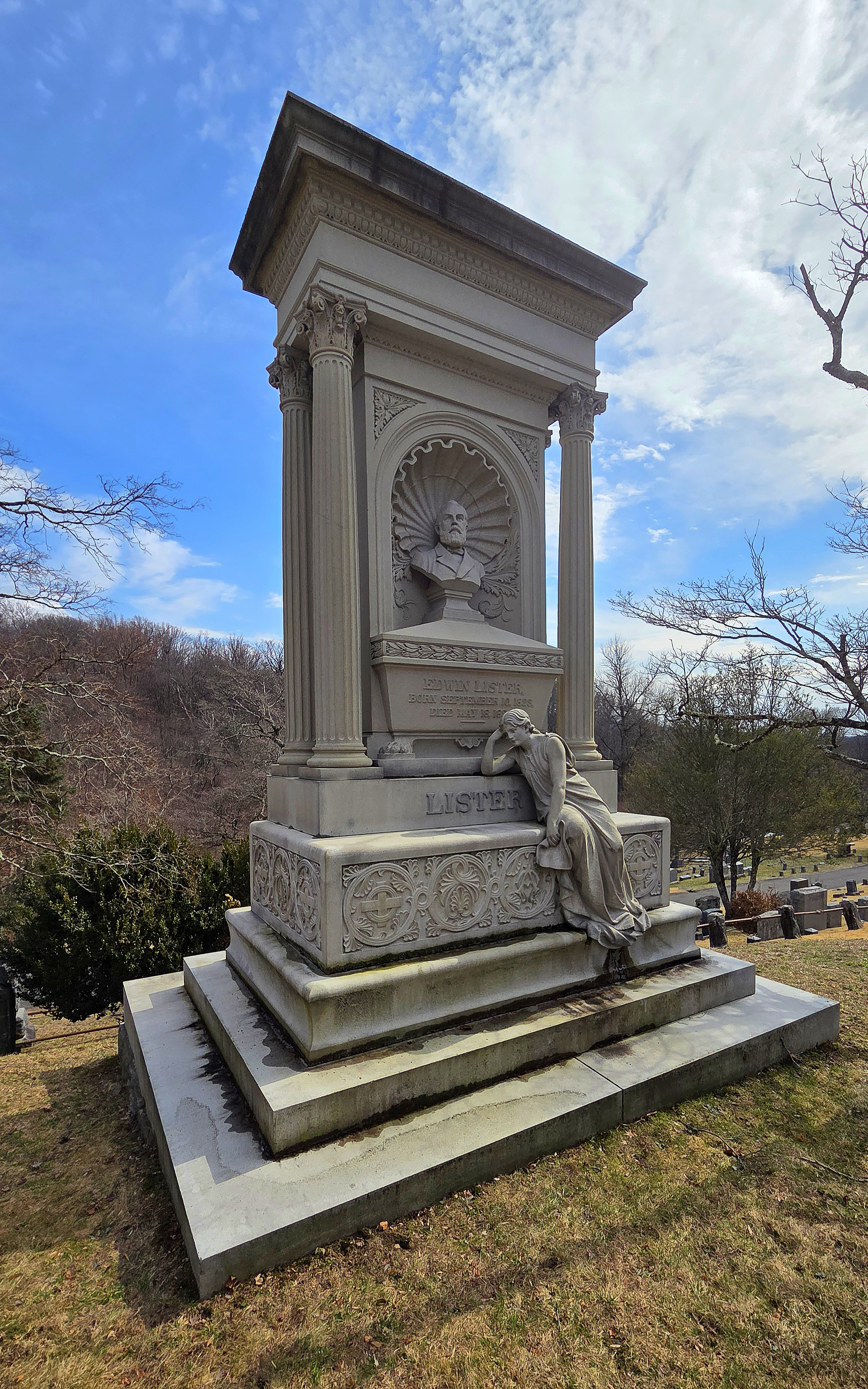
Edwin Lister Monument (ca. 1898)

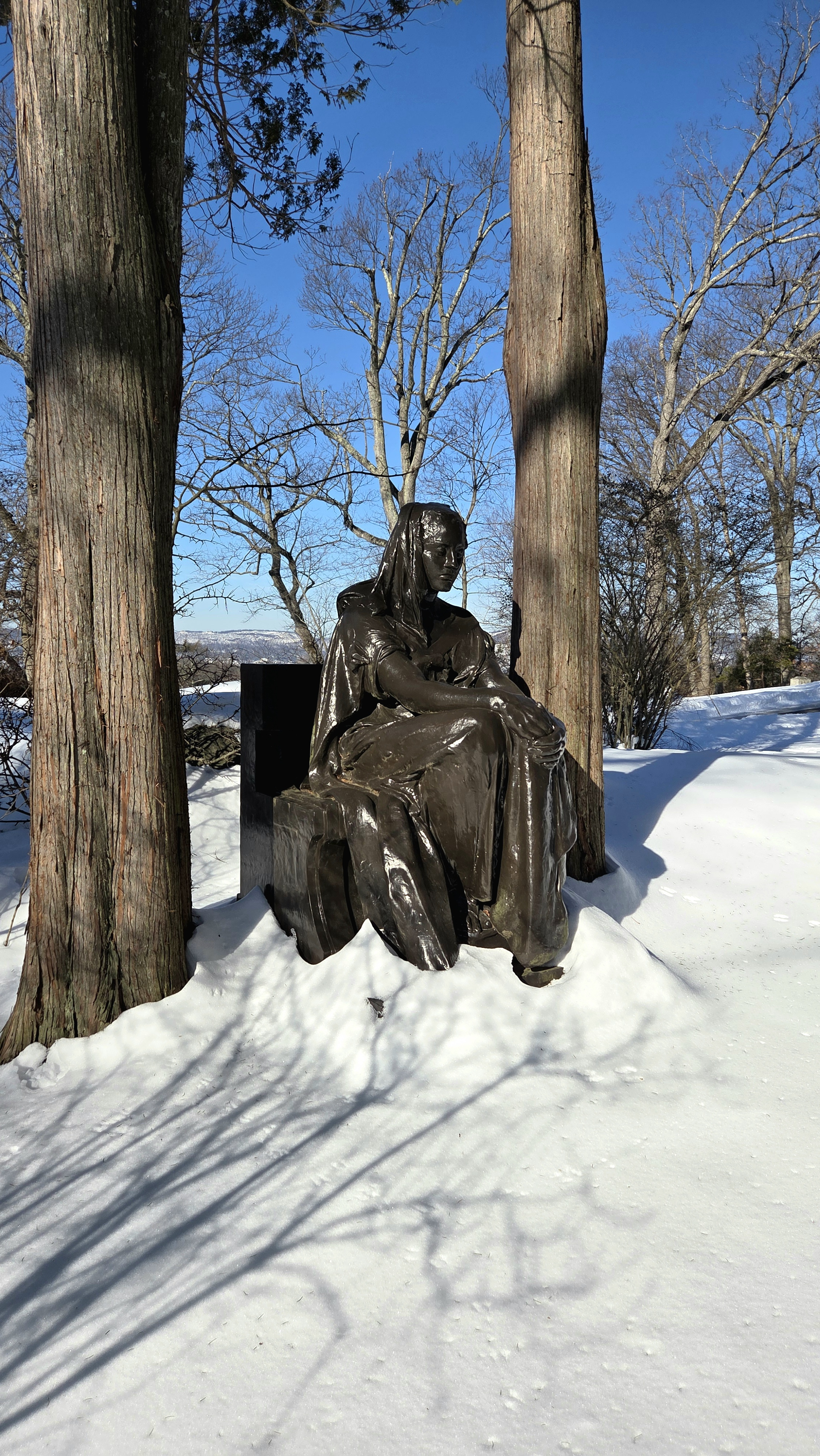
Bronze Lady (1903)

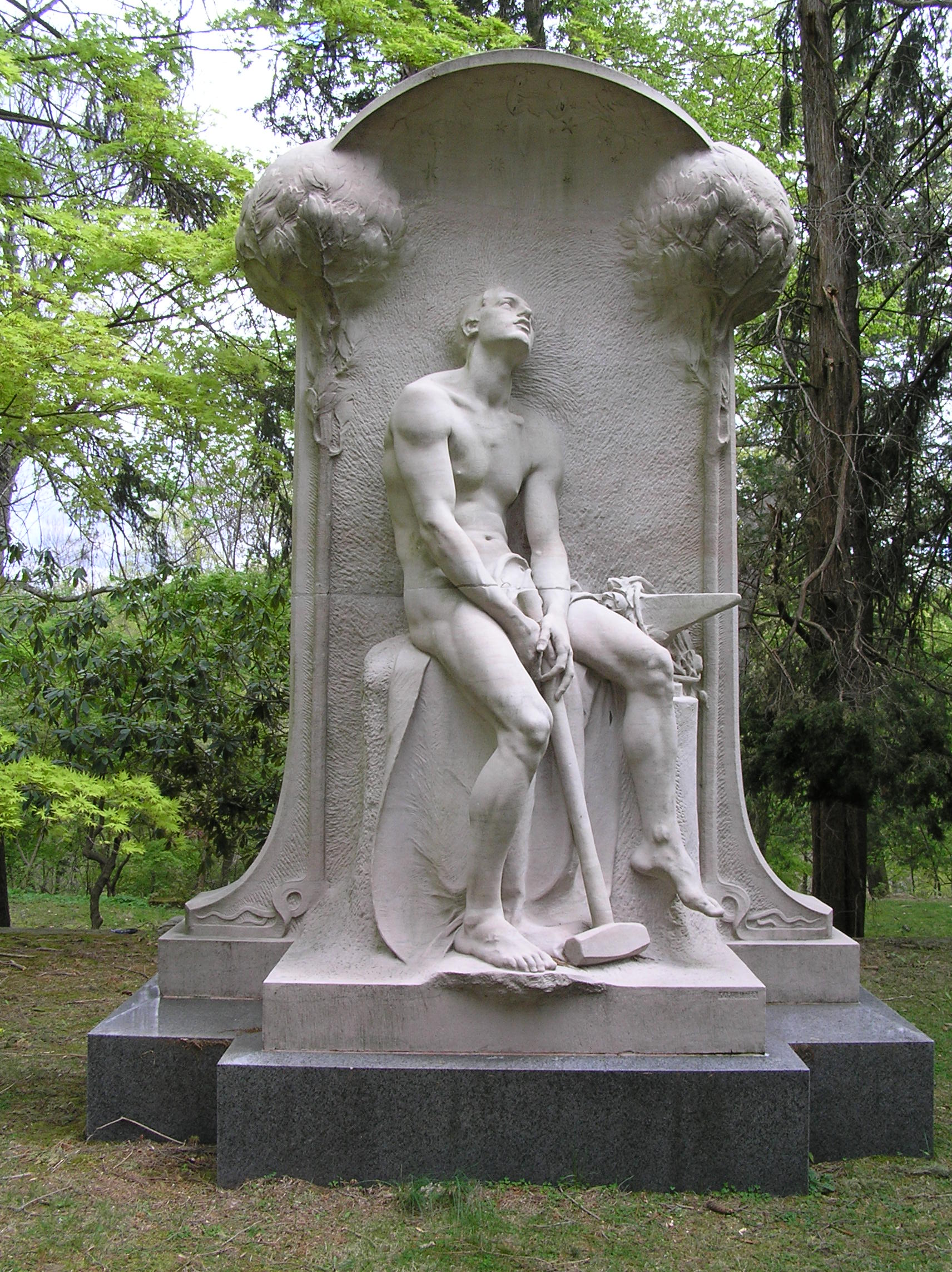
Henry Villard Memorial (1904)

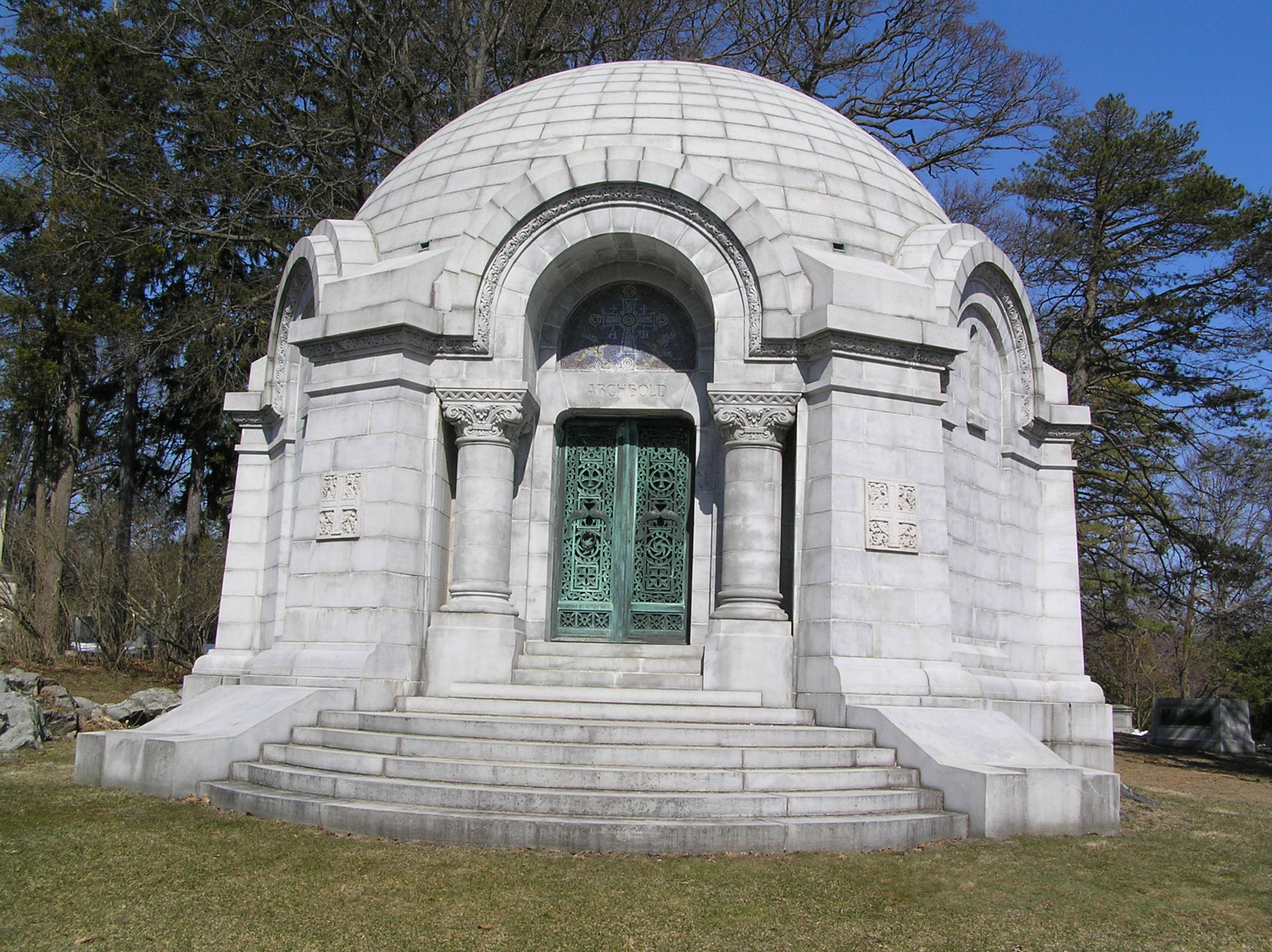
John Dustin Archbold Mausoleum (1906)

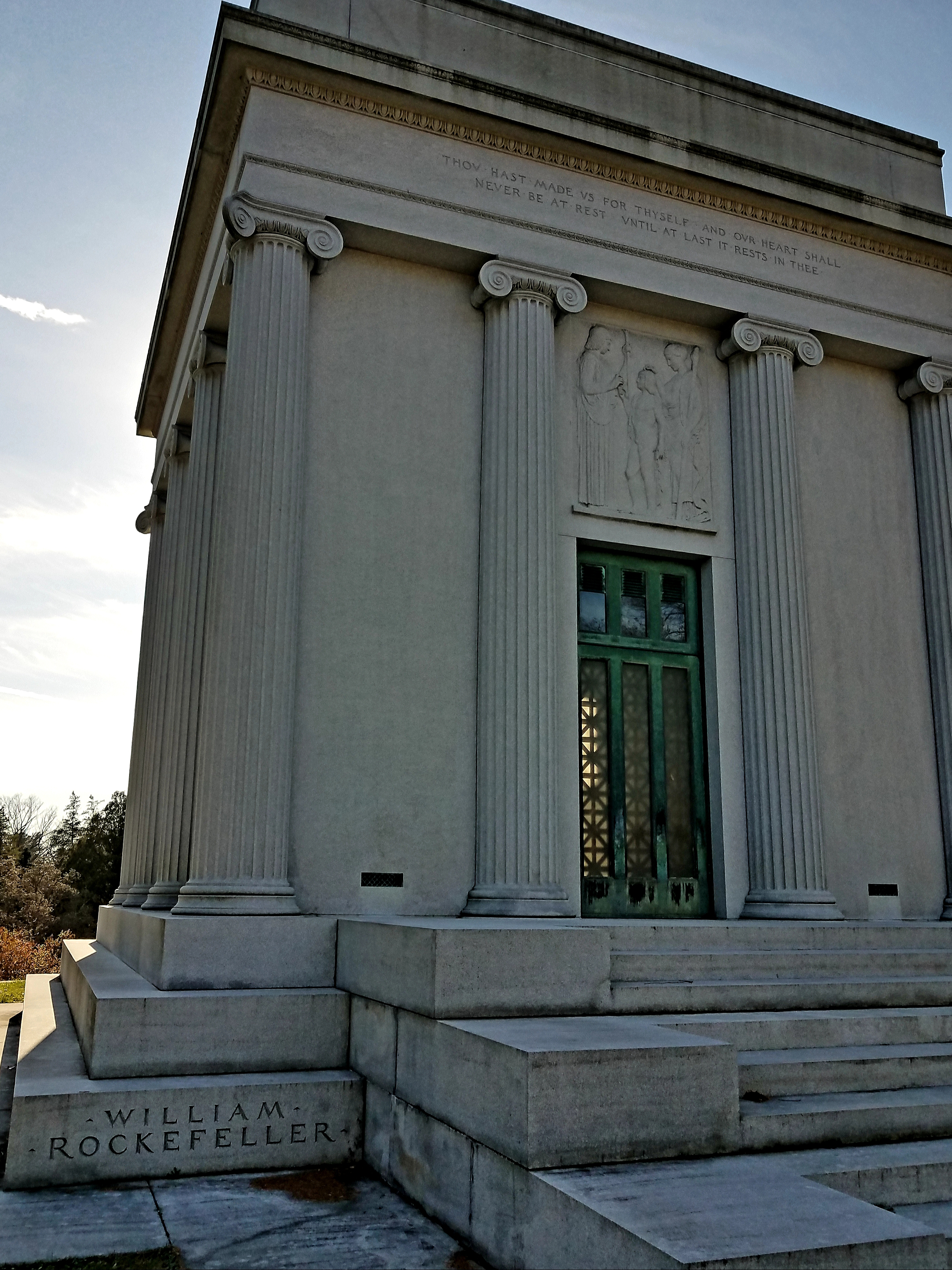
William Rockefeller Mausoleum (1920)

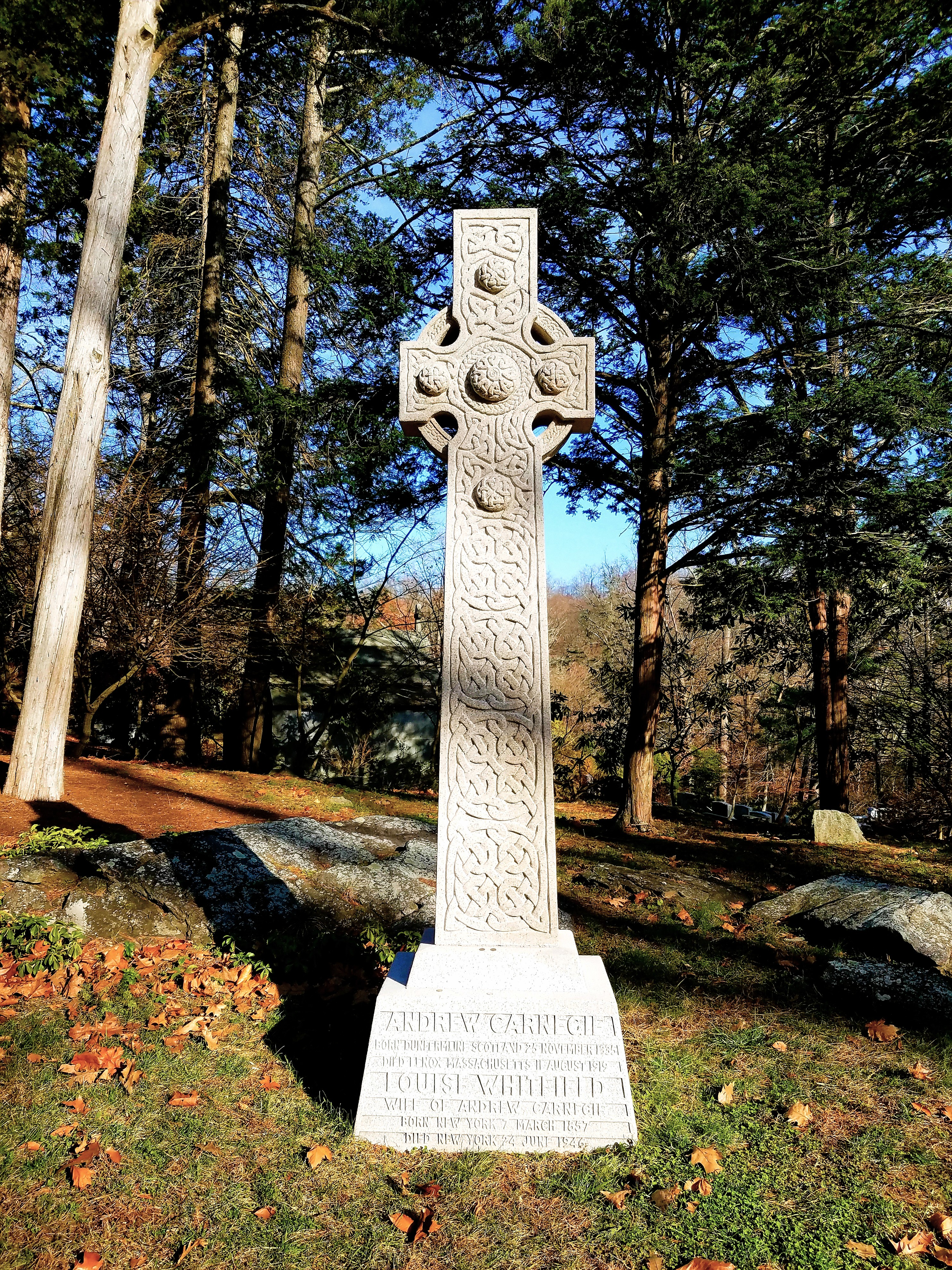
Andrew Carnegie gravesite (1923)

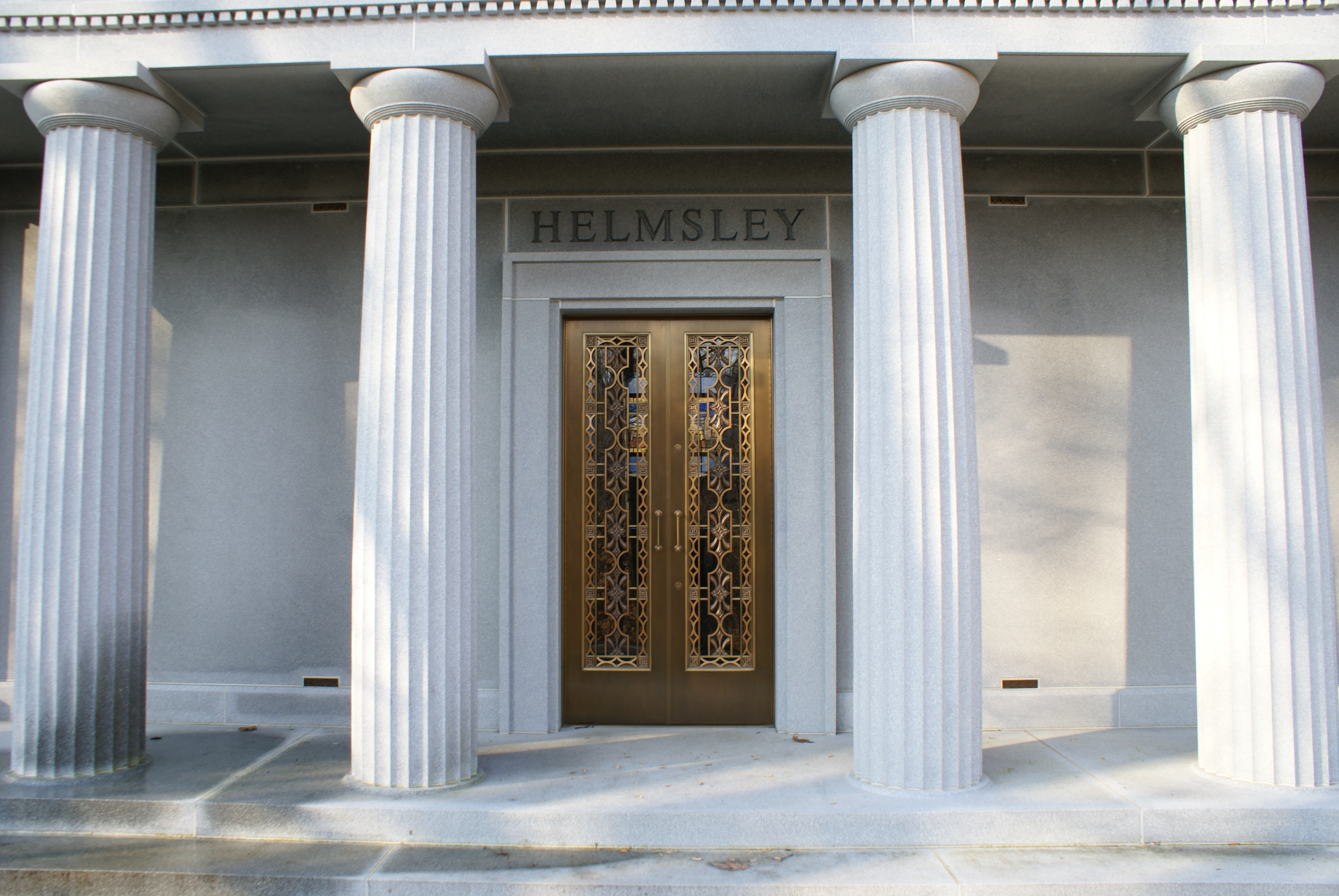
Helmsley Mausoleum (2007)

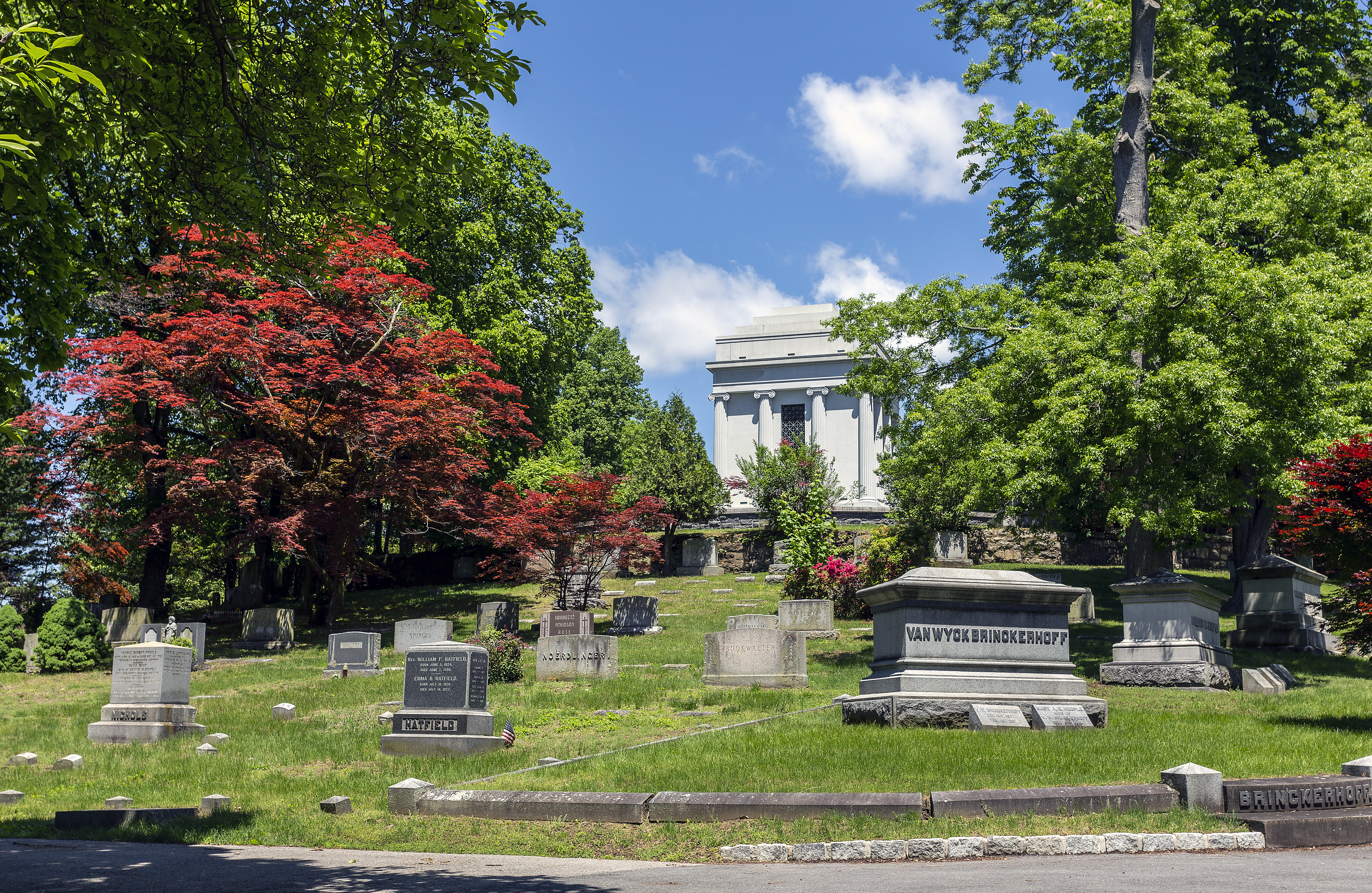
Northern section of the cemetery in 2018, with a hill crowned by William Rockefeller Mausoleum

Darius Ogden Mills Mausoleum (1883), designed by the famous architect Richard Morris Hunt, was commissioned and built decades before Darius Ogden Mills' death in 1910. Its construction coincided with the height of the Gilded Age, a period when wealthy industrial families built increasingly elaborate monuments in garden cemeteries such as Sleepy Hollow Cemetery. A Roman temple-like structure with grand Ionic columns, it reflects the Neoclassical and Beaux-Arts styles favored by the era's elite. Unlike many traditional mausoleums, it is noted for having large, floor-to-ceiling windows on each side and in the roof, designed to capture light and highlight the silver-painted stars on the walls and floors; it creates a play of light that symbolizes eternal life and celestial presence. Visitors can see the ornate sarcophagi and interior decorations without entering, a rare feature in 19th-century funerary architecture.

The monument of Owen Jones (1884) is an example of Gothic Revival architecture, adorned with stonework and a life-sized marble statue of Jones, who was a dry goods store owner in Manhattan. This sculpture of Jones represents him in period costume.

The Civil War Soldiers Monument (1890) was erected in honor of the Union Army veterans of the American Civil War, most of whom served in Company H of the 32nd New York Infantry Regiment. The Company was composed exclusively of local volunteers from the Tarrytown area. They fought in the First Battle of Bull Run, the Peninsular Campaign, and the Battles of South Mountain, Antietam, and Chancellorsville. Many of them are buried in the cemetery, near the monument. Its granite base is topped by a 7-foot-6-inch bronze statue of a Union infantry soldier standing at "parade rest"; bronze plaques on the base list some 240 names.

John Hudson Hall Monument (1894) is one of the most popular and visually striking monuments in the cemetery. Hall was a highly successful paper manufacturer, a developer of New York's elevated railroad system, and an art patron who amassed a large personal collection and commissioned the famous sculptor Augustus Saint-Gaudens to create his funerary monument. It is a rare stone version of Saint-Gaudens' masterpiece, Amor Caritas (Angel of Charity), his vision of the ethereal female, which he modeled repeatedly between 1880 and 1898. A heroic-sized (larger than life-size) bronze version won the Grand Prize at the Paris Exposition Universelle of 1900, cementing Saint-Gaudens' reputation as America's premier sculptor. Because of its popularity, some 20 smaller-scale versions were produced by Saint-Gaudens and sold through high-end retail outlets such as Tiffany & Co. Most of them are now in museums, including the Metropolitan Museum of Art. The face of the angel is modeled after the artist's longtime mistress and muse, Davida Johnson Clark. In the Hall Memorial version, the angel is set into a massive granite pedestal featuring a bas-relief portrait of Hall himself at the base.

Revolutionary Soldiers' Monument (1894) is a simple granite obelisk, but its location is significant: it was built on top of the cemetery's Battle Hill, which was a strategic local spot during the Revolutionary War, where a lunette (or redoubt) had been built by American soldiers around 1779 by to guard a strategic Albany Post Road crossing over Pocantico River. A Revolutionary War cannon is positioned in the same spot where a cannon was trained during the war to defend the crossing. Battle Hill may have been the place where Hulda of Bohemia (c.1700-c.1777), the semi-legendary "witch" of Sleepy Hollow, was killed by British soldiers while protecting the local militiamen. Funds for the monument were raised under the leadership of Marcius D. Raymond, publisher of the local Tarrytown Argus newspaper. It was erected specifically to honor the local veterans of the Revolution who are buried in the adjacent Old Dutch Burying Ground, which holds one of the highest concentrations of Revolutionary War veteran graves in the state of New York. The October 19, 1894, dedication was a major event: crowds from New York City and the area arrived by trains and excursion boats, a parade came up Broadway, and two Navy cruisers in the Tappan Zee provided a dramatic cannon salute. (Raymond later published a book detailing the celebration, which also contains invaluable historical data on related Revolutionary War events and the families whose names are inscribed on the monument.)

Not far from the Revolutionary Soldiers' Monument, on the very top of the Battle Hill, is another, much taller and significantly older monument–a granite pillar topped by a figure symbolizing Hope and surrounded by multiple marble figures. It is the Delavan Monument, dedicated in 1871 to the memory of General Daniel Delavan (1757–1835), who commanded one of the Westchester County Militia regiments during the War. The Sleepy Hollow Cemetery did not exist when General Delavan passed away; however, 35 years later, his son was able to move his father and several other family members from Sparta Cemetery in Ossining to the Battle Hill, at which his father may have fought almost a century before. (The Delavan family was remarkably active in the war effort; family patriarch Timothy Delavan (1712–1803) and several of his sons, including Daniel, Samuel, and Nathaniel, are recorded as having served the American cause.)

Edwin Lister Monument (ca. 1898) is one of the most stunning memorials in the cemetery. The 12-foot-high structure was expertly crafted by the Connecticut company New England Granite Works and featured in the company catalog to showcase its skill in creating one-of-a-kind, custom memorials. Lister was a cofounder of Listers Agricultural Chemical Works, a massive fertilizer plant in Newark, New Jersey. Carved from gray granite, the monument features his stately bust atop a sarcophagus flanked on either side by Corinthian columns, supporting a lintel and cornice. However, the most prominent feature of the monument is a life-sized, sorrowing female figure seated on its base, resting her head on her proper right hand—a striking example of Victorian-era funerary sentiment.

Recueillement, also known as Bronze Lady (1903), is a mournful seated statue across from Gen. Samuel Russell Thomas's mausoleum, commissioned by his widow, Ann Porter Thomas, from the noted sculptor Andrew O'Connor. Many visitors and experts have praised the statue's life-like appearance and the "enchanting" quality of the bronze work. Others, including Thomas's widow, have felt disturbed by the statue's haunted, unsettling expression. The widow asked O'Connor to replace the statue's head; the sculptor, however, refused. The statue has become a centerpiece of local legendry. It is one of the most visited memorials in the cemetery.

Henry Villard Memorial (1904) was designed by the prominent architectural sculptor Karl Bitter for the gravesite of the journalist and financier Henry Villard. It is a rare and notable example of the Art Nouveau movement in American cemetery sculpture and in American funerary art in general. The central life-size marble figure, titled "Labor at Rest," depicts a man resting against an anvil while holding a sledgehammer. This imagery reflects Villard's career as a railroad tycoon.

John Dustin Archbold Mausoleum (1906) is a notable example of Gilded Age funerary architecture. Due to its distinct Byzantine-inspired dome and other “Eastern” architectural elements, it contrasts with the cemetery’s other, more traditional Neoclassical mausoleums. It features a one-of-a-kind green granite exterior and a spectacular glass mosaic ceiling inside, crafted by prominent stained-glass designer Otto Heinigke, depicting Christian symbols and angels. The structure, built by the prominent construction firm the Norcross Brothers, measures 36 feet by 36 feet and is 32 feet tall; it contains 12 crypts. The design for the mausoleum was commissioned by John Dustin Archbold himself from the New York firm of Morris, Butler & Rodman; it was published in the American Architect and Building News in 1906. Before Archbold’s own death in 1916, it notably served as a temporary resting place for Laura Spelman Rockefeller, wife of John D. Rockefeller, for four and a half months, due to legal and tax complications delaying her final burial in Cleveland, Ohio. The Archbold Mausoleum is situated directly across from the William Rockefeller Mausoleum.

William Rockefeller Mausoleum (1920) was designed by architect William Welles Bosworth, who later restored the Palace of Versailles, for the family of William Rockefeller Jr. Rockefeller commissioned the building after his wife of 56 years, Almira Geraldine Goodsell Rockefeller, died. Its construction was a major local event; in 1922, The New York Times reported on the difficulty of moving a 32-ton block of granite (for the mausoleum's unique single-slab walkway) to the site. The Neoclassical tomb, with Ionic columns and a pyramid-style roof, is over 35 feet across, more than 43 feet deep, and 38 feet 5 inches high. Rockefeller bypassed the customary bold, high-profile placement of the family name above the entrance, opting instead for a subtle inscription on the bottom step of the stylobate. The mausoleum is situated on a hilltop plot called Rockefeller Circle, less than a mile south of his (since demolished) extensive estate, Rockwood Hall, where he resided for 36 years and where he died. One of his sons, William Goodsell Rockefeller, is buried alongside his parents in the mausoleum vault. Other descendants, including son Percy Avery Rockefeller, dauthter Geraldine Rockefeller Dodge, and grandson Marcellus Hartley Dodge Jr., as well as Byron M. Hawks, the family's estate superintendent of many years, are buried under uniform granite gravestones around the perimeter of the mausoleum.

Andrew Carnegie's gravestone (1923) was erected four years after his burial in the cemetery. In keeping with his wishes, it is intentionally simple, reflecting Carnegie's philosophy on wealth and philanthropy, expressed in his famous article "The Gospel of Wealth." The granite slab for the headstone was hewn from a quarry on the Skibo estate in Scotland, Andrew Carnegie's home, and sent to sculptor George Henry Paulin at his studio in Glasgow, where it was sculpted into a Celtic cross, before being shipped to the United States. Surrounding his grave are the final resting places of his loyal household staff, including his butler, nurse, and chambermaid, all of whom were also born in Scotland. It is common for visitors to leave coins on his gravestone as a tribute to his philanthropic legacy or for good fortune.

Helmsley Mausoleum (2005-2007), the final resting place of Harry and Leona Helmsley, features windows showing a stylized Manhattan skyline in stained glass that only includes buildings Harry Helmsley owned or controlled, such as the Empire State Building, once the centerpiece of the Helmsley real estate empire. The mausoleum was built by Mrs. Helmsley at a cost of $1.4 million. She had her husband's body moved from its original resting place in Woodlawn Cemetery (Bronx, New York) to the new mausoleum because a new, massive public mausoleum was built near their private plot at Woodlawn, spoiling the secluded, exclusive view she desired. She filed a $150 million lawsuit against Woodlawn Cemetery over the construction. The move to Sleepy Hollow Cemetery was not without controversy either: it was delayed when she cleared trees on the new property without obtaining proper permits, resulting in a temporary halt by village officials. Leona died two years after the new mausoleum was largely functional and Harry’s remains were moved there. The Helmsley sarcophagi, standing side by side on an inlaid marble floor in the center of the mausoleum, feature romantic inscriptions they wrote for each other.

The cemetery features numerous other memorials associated with stories—such as the Crane Monument erected by Gertrude Beekman, the grave of Marcellus Hartley Dodge Jr. at the foot of the William Rockefeller Mausoleum, and the murder–suicide story of the Ford brothers, purposely buried in the same grave.

== Notable burials ==
Numerous notable people are interred at Sleepy Hollow Cemetery, including:

- Viola Allen (1867–1948), actress
- John Dustin Archbold (1848–1916), Standard Oil company director
- Elizabeth Arden (1878–1966), businesswoman and cosmetics magnate; buried under the name Elizabeth N. Graham
- Felix Arndt (1889-1918), pianist and composer
- Brooke Astor (1902–2007), philanthropist and socialite
- Vincent Astor (1891–1959), philanthropist
- Leo Baekeland (1863–1944), Belgian chemist and namesake of Bakelite
- Robert Livingston Beeckman (1866–1935), former governor of Rhode Island
- Marty Bergen (1869–1906), racing jockey
- Heber R. Bishop (1840–1902), businessman and antiquities collector
- Holbrook Blinn (1872–1928), American actor
- Henry E. Bliss (1870–1955), devised the Bliss library classification system
- Artur Bodanzky (1877–1939), New York Metropolitan Opera conductor
- Major Edward Bowes (1874–1946), early radio star and host of Major Bowes' Amateur Hour
- Alice Brady (1892–1939), American actress
- Andrew Carnegie (1835–1919), businessman and philanthropist;
- Louise Whitfield Carnegie (1857–1946), wife of Andrew Carnegie
- Walter Chrysler (1875–1940), businessman, founder of the Chrysler Corporation
- Francis Pharcellus Church (1839–1906), editor of The New York Sun and author of the editorial "Yes, Virginia, there is a Santa Claus"
- William Conant Church (1836–1917), co-founder of Armed Forces Journal and the NRA
- Henry Sloane Coffin (1877–1954), teacher, minister, and author
- William Sloane Coffin, Sr. (1879–1933), businessman
- Kent Cooper (1880–1965), head of the Associated Press from 1925 to 1948
- Jasper Francis Cropsey (1823–1900), Hudson River School painter and architect
- Floyd Crosby (1899–1985), Oscar-winning cinematographer, father of musician David Crosby
- Daniel Draper (1841–1931), meteorologist
- Geraldine Rockefeller Dodge (1882–1973), heiress and patron of the arts
- William H. Douglas (1853–1944), U.S. Representative from New York from 1901 to 1905
- Maud Earl (1864–1943), British-American painter of canines
- Parker Fennelly (1891–1988), American actor
- Malcolm Webster Ford (1862–1902), amateur athlete and journalist who killed himself and younger brother Paul in a murder-suicide
- Paul Leicester Ford (1865–1902), editor, bibliographer, novelist, and biographer; brother of Malcolm Webster Ford
- Dixon Ryan Fox (1887–1945), educator and president of Union College, New York
- Herman Frasch (1851–1914), German chemist and mining engineer
- Samuel Gompers (1850–1924), founder of the American Federation of Labor
- Madison Grant (1865–1937), eugenicist and conservationist, author of The Passing of the Great Race
- Moses Hicks Grinnell (1803–1877), congressman and Central Park Commissioner
- Walter S. Gurnee (1805–1903), mayor of Chicago
- Angelica Hamilton (1784–1857), the older of two daughters of Alexander Hamilton
- James Alexander Hamilton (1788–1878), third son of Alexander Hamilton
- Robert Havell, Jr. (1793–1878), British-American engraver who printed and colored John James Audubon's monumental Birds of America series, also painter in the style of the Hudson River School
- Mark Hellinger (1903–1947), New York theater journalist; producer of The Naked City
- Harry Helmsley (1909–1997), real estate mogul
- Leona Helmsley (1920–2007), wife of Harry Helmsley
- John Warne Herbert Jr. (1852-1934), played in the first collegiate football game for Rutgers, and later mayor of Helmetta, New Jersey
- Robert Hoe III (1839-1909), printing press manufacturer
- Eliza Hamilton Holly (1799–1859), younger daughter of Alexander Hamilton
- Raymond Mathewson Hood (1881–1934), architect
- William Howard Hoople (1868–1922), a leader of the nineteenth-century American Holiness movement and one of the early leaders of the Church of the Nazarene
- Washington Irving (1783–1859), author of The Legend of Sleepy Hollow and Rip Van Winkle
- William Irving (1766–1821), U.S. congressman
- George Jones (1811–1891), co-founder of The New York Times
- Albert Lasker (1880–1952), American advertising executive
- Mary Lasker (1900–1994), wife of Albert Lasker; American health activist
- Walter W. Law, Jr. (1871–1958), lawyer and politician, son of Briarcliff Manor founder Walter W. Law
- Lewis Edward Lawes (1883–1947), reformist warden of Sing Sing prison
- William E. Le Roy (1818–1888), United States Navy rear admiral
- Ann Lohman (1812–1878), a.k.a. Madame Restell, 19th century purveyor of patent medicine and abortions
- Charles D. Millard (1873–1944), member of U.S. House of Representatives from New York
- Darius Ogden Mills (1825–1910), real estate mogul
- Belle Moskowitz (1877–1933), political advisor and social activist
- Robertson Kirtland Mygatt (1861–1919), American landscape painter
- N. Holmes Odell (1828–1904), U.S. Representative from New York
- George Washington Olvany (1876–1952), New York General Sessions Court judge and leader of Tammany Hall
- William Orton (1826–1878), President of Western Union
- Peter A. Peyser (1921–2014), New York congressman (1971—1983)
- Whitelaw Reid (1837–1912), journalist and editor of the New-York Tribune and 1892 vice-presidential candidate
- William Rockefeller Jr. (1841–1922), New York head of the Standard Oil Company
- William Goodsell Rockefeller (1870–1922), Standard Oil treasurer and son of William Rockefeller Jr.
- Percy Avery Rockefeller (1878–1934), one of the most prolific board directors in American history, son of William Rockefeller Jr.
- Edgar Evertson Saltus (1855–1921), American novelist
- Francis Saltus Saltus (1849–1889), American poet
- Carl Schurz (1820–1906), senator, secretary of the interior under President Rutherford B. Hayes
- Charles Sheeler (1883–1965), painter and photographer, and his wife Musya (1908–1981), photographer
- William G. Stahlnecker (1849–1902), U.S. Representative from New York
- Egerton Swartwout (1870–1943), New York architect
- Samuel Russell Thomas (1840-1903), U.S. Civil War General and railroad executive
- William Boyce Thompson (1869–1930), founder of Newmont Mining Corporation and financier
- Joseph Urban (1872–1933), architect and theatre set designer
- Henry Villard (1835–1900), railroad baron whose monument was created by Karl Bitter.
- Oswald Garrison Villard (1872–1949), son of Henry Villard and grandson of William Lloyd Garrison; one of the founders of the NAACP
- William A. Walker (1805–1861), U.S. Representative from New York
- Paul Warburg (1868–1932), German-American banker
- Worcester Reed Warner (1846–1929), mechanical engineer and telescope manufacturer
- Thomas J. Watson (1874–1956), founder of IBM
- Theodore Whitmarsh (1869–1936), administrator of the United States Food Administration and Federal Reserve Bank of New York director
- Hans Zinsser (1878–1940), microbiologist and author

=== Gallery ===
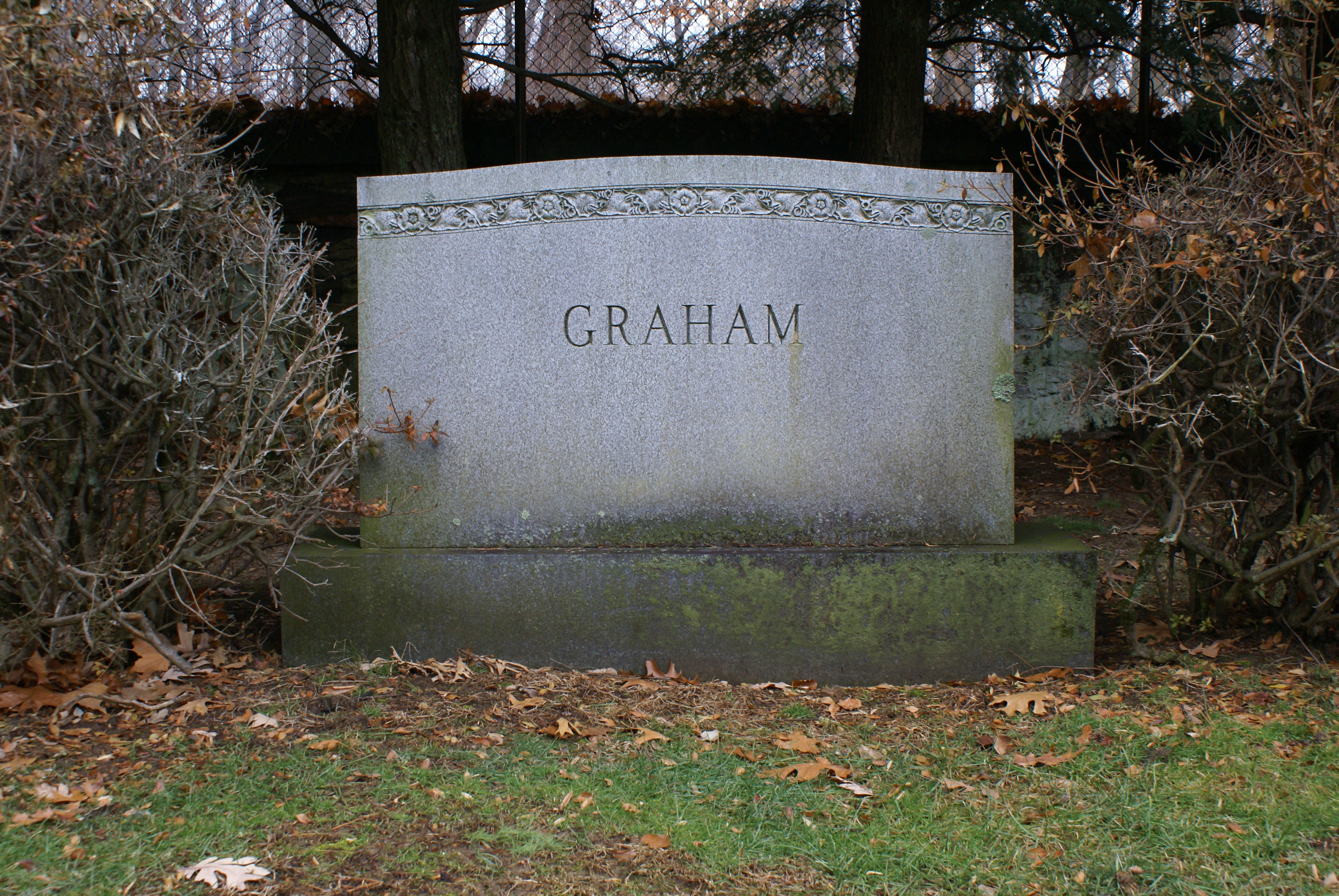
Elizabeth Arden headstone (buried under the family name of Graham)

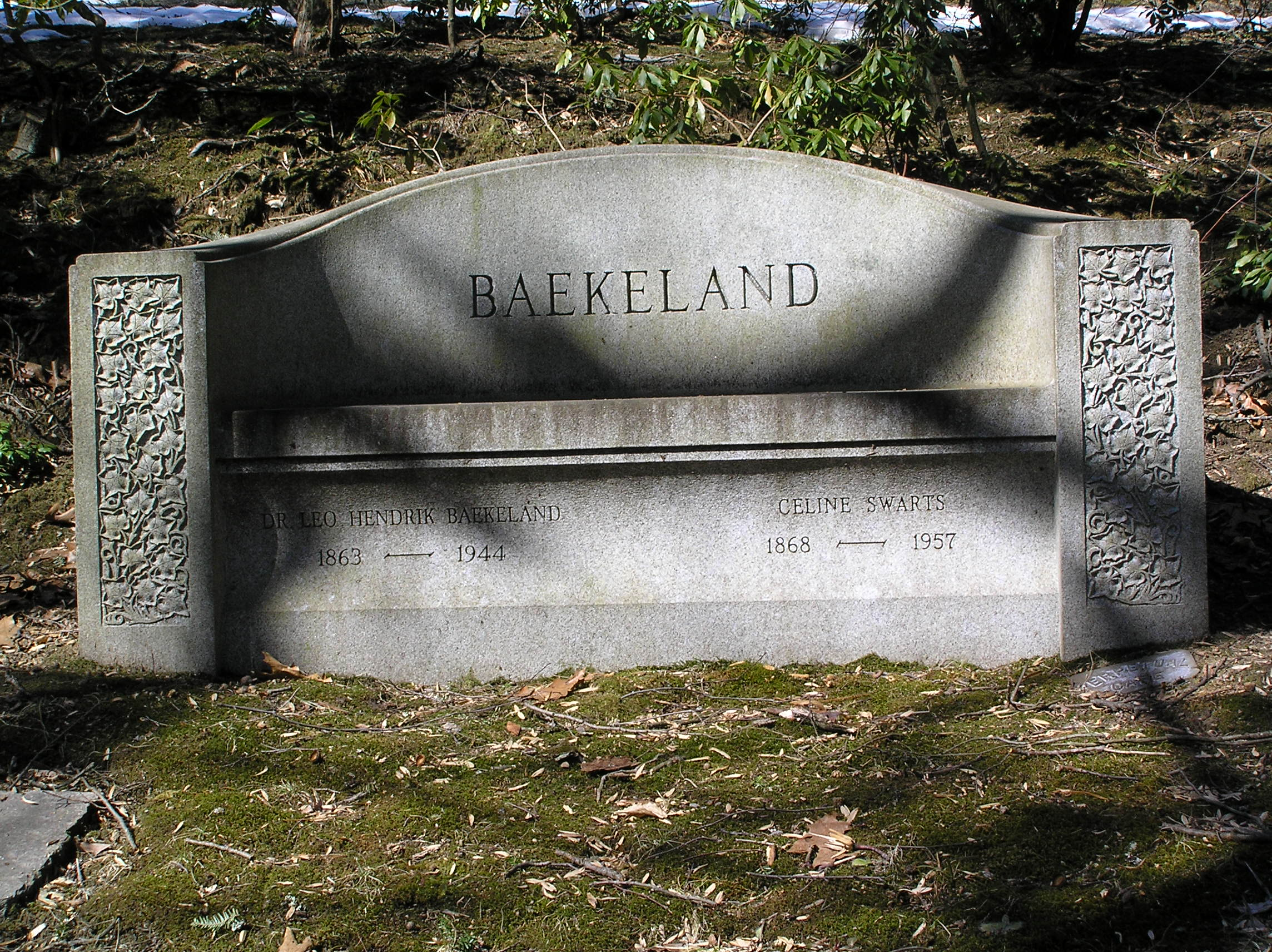
Leo Baekeland gravesite

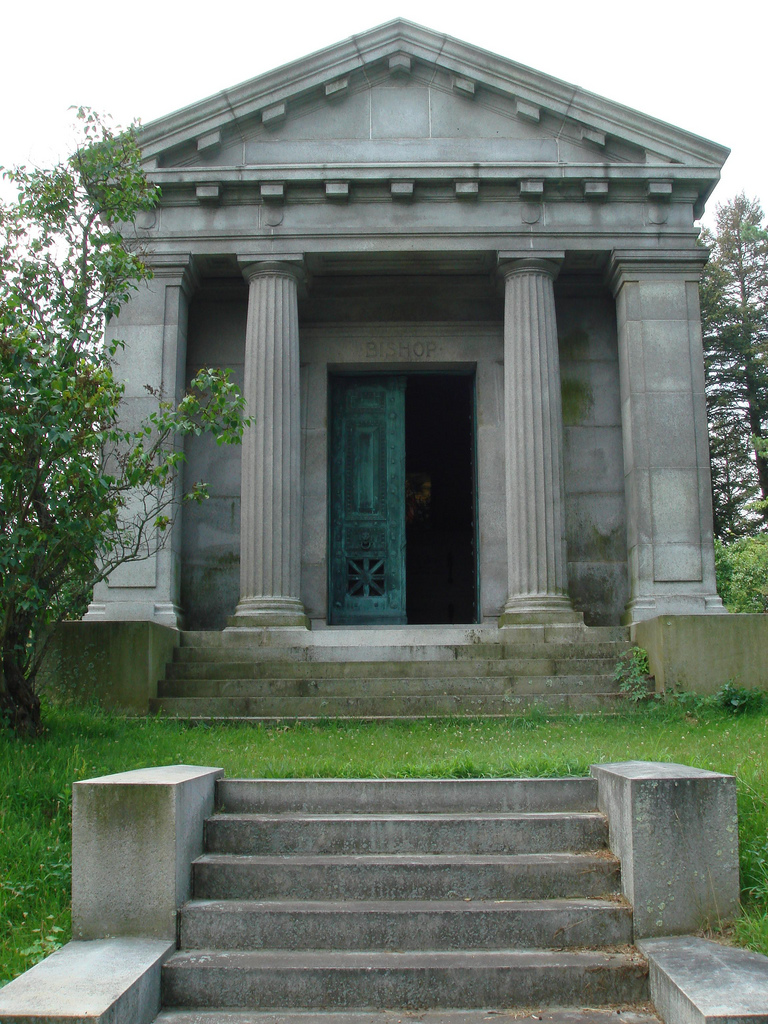
Heber R. Bishop mausoleum

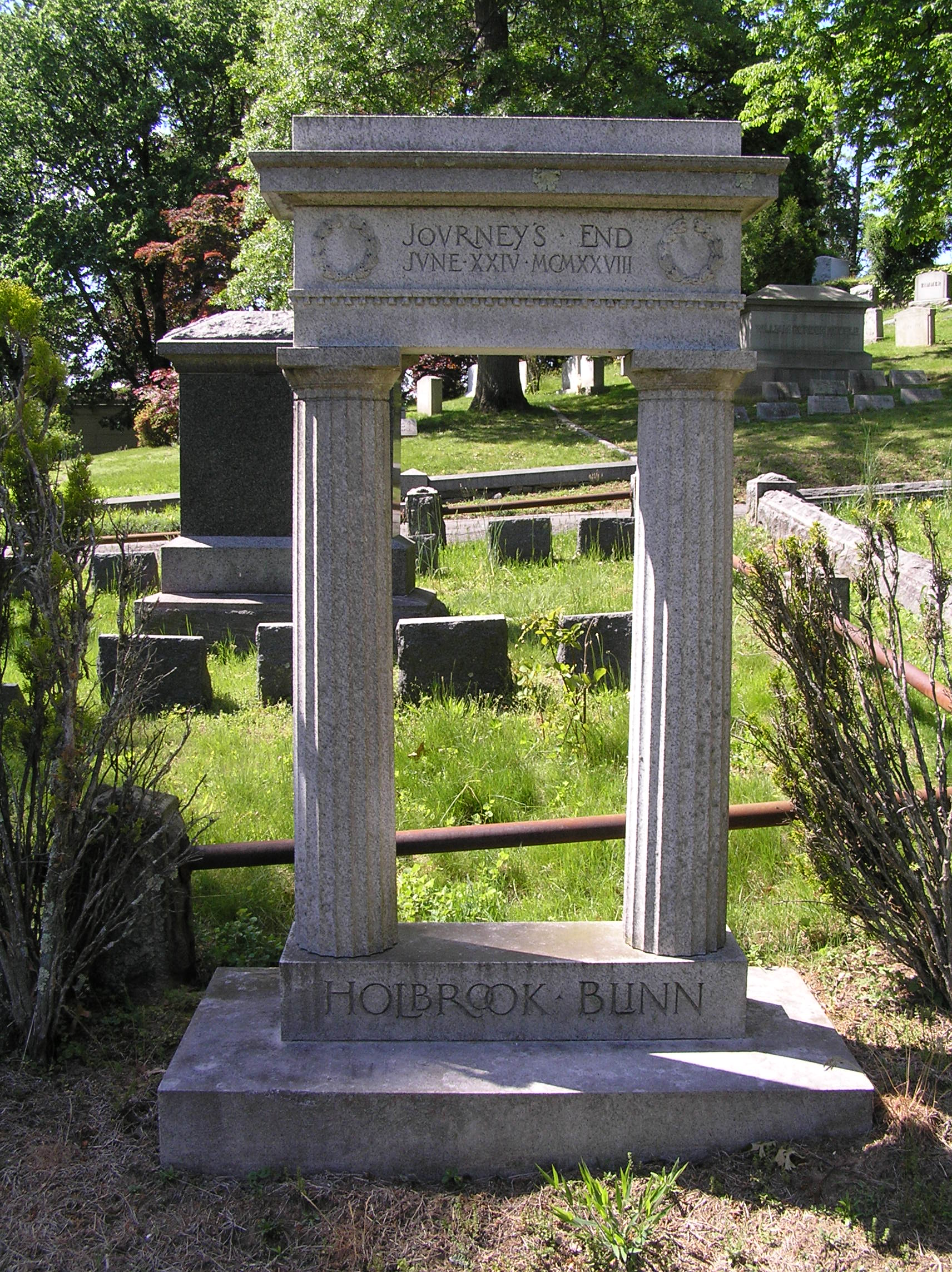
Holbrook Blinn monument

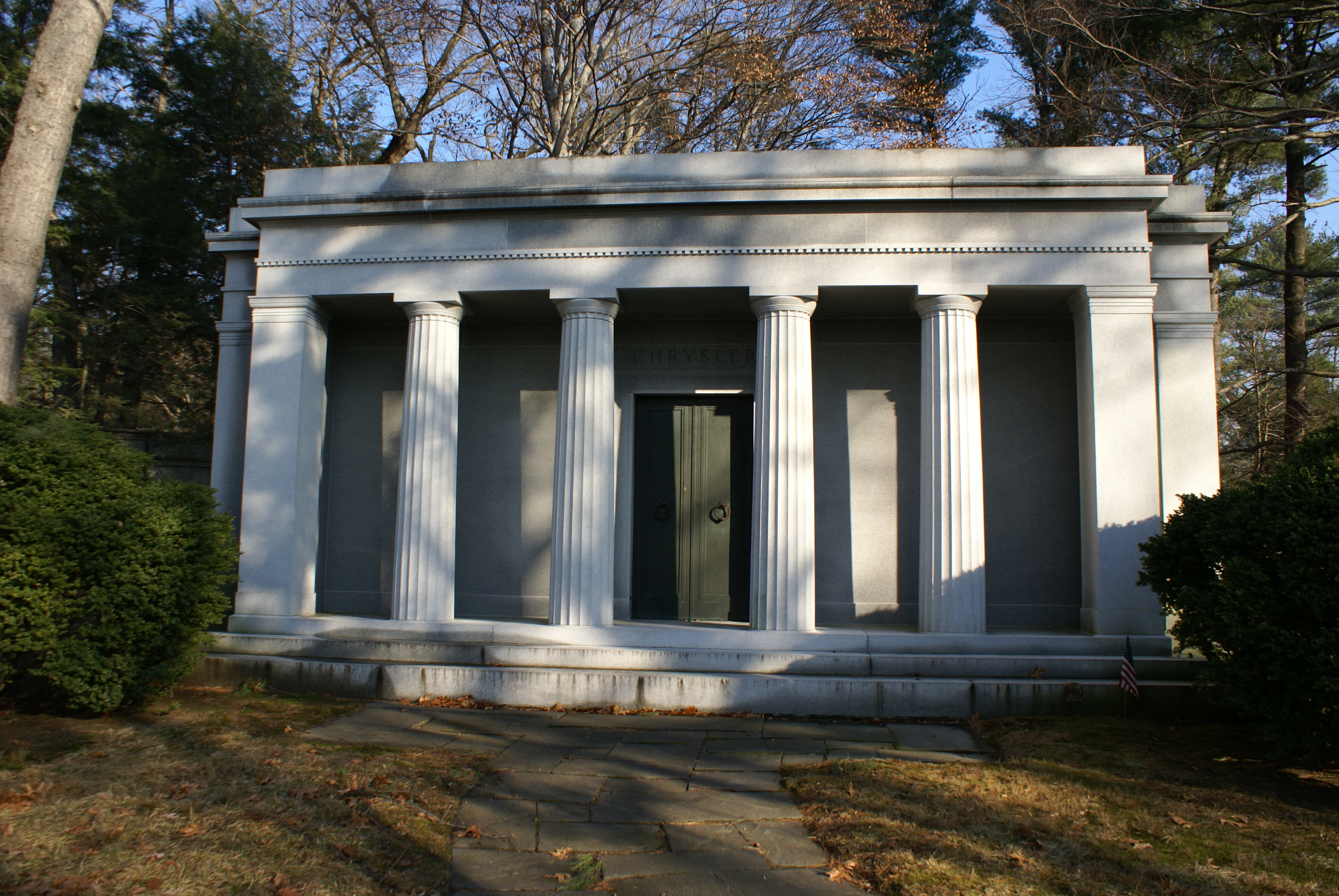
Walter Chrysler mausoleum

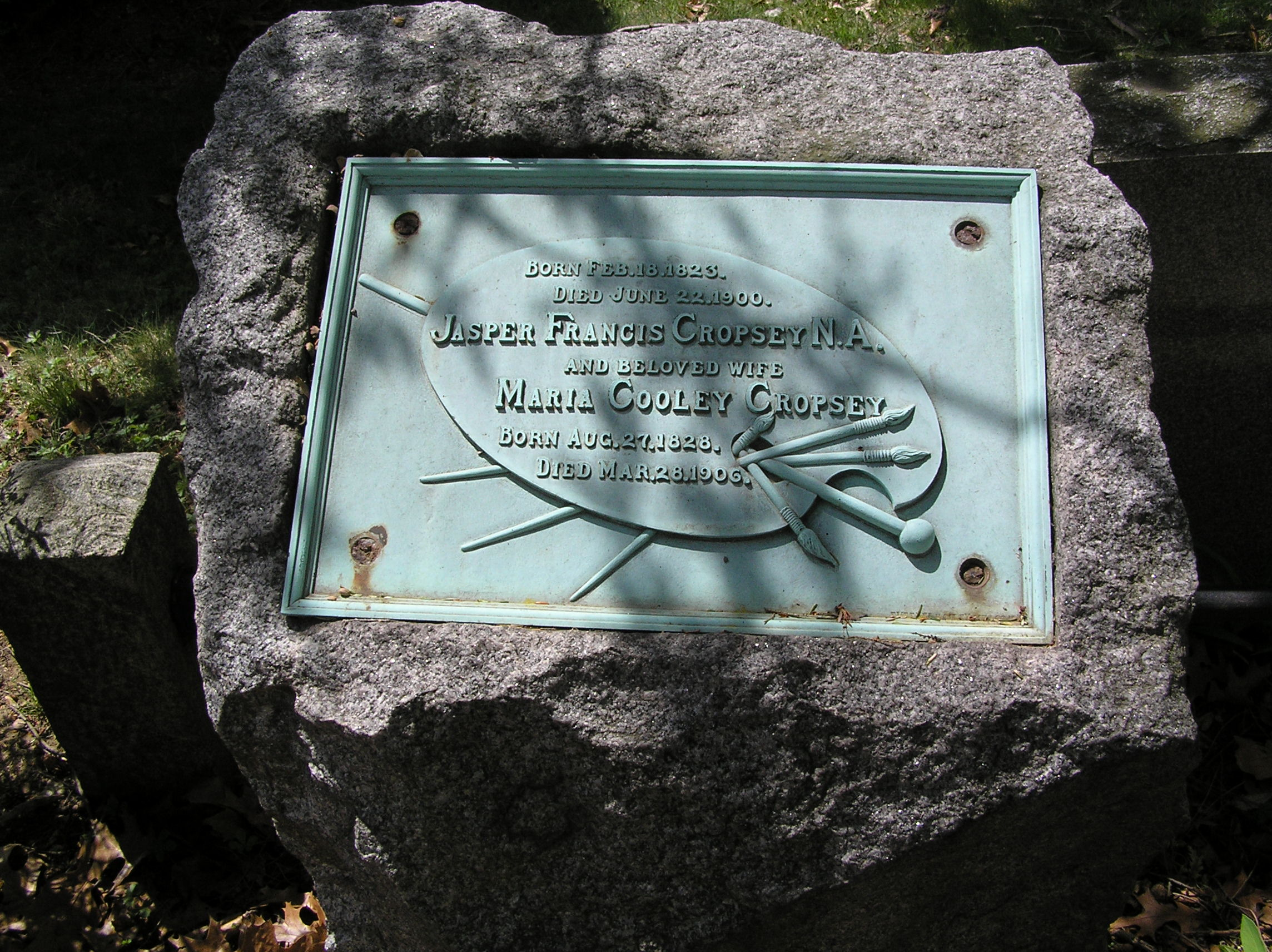
Jasper Francis Cropsey headstone

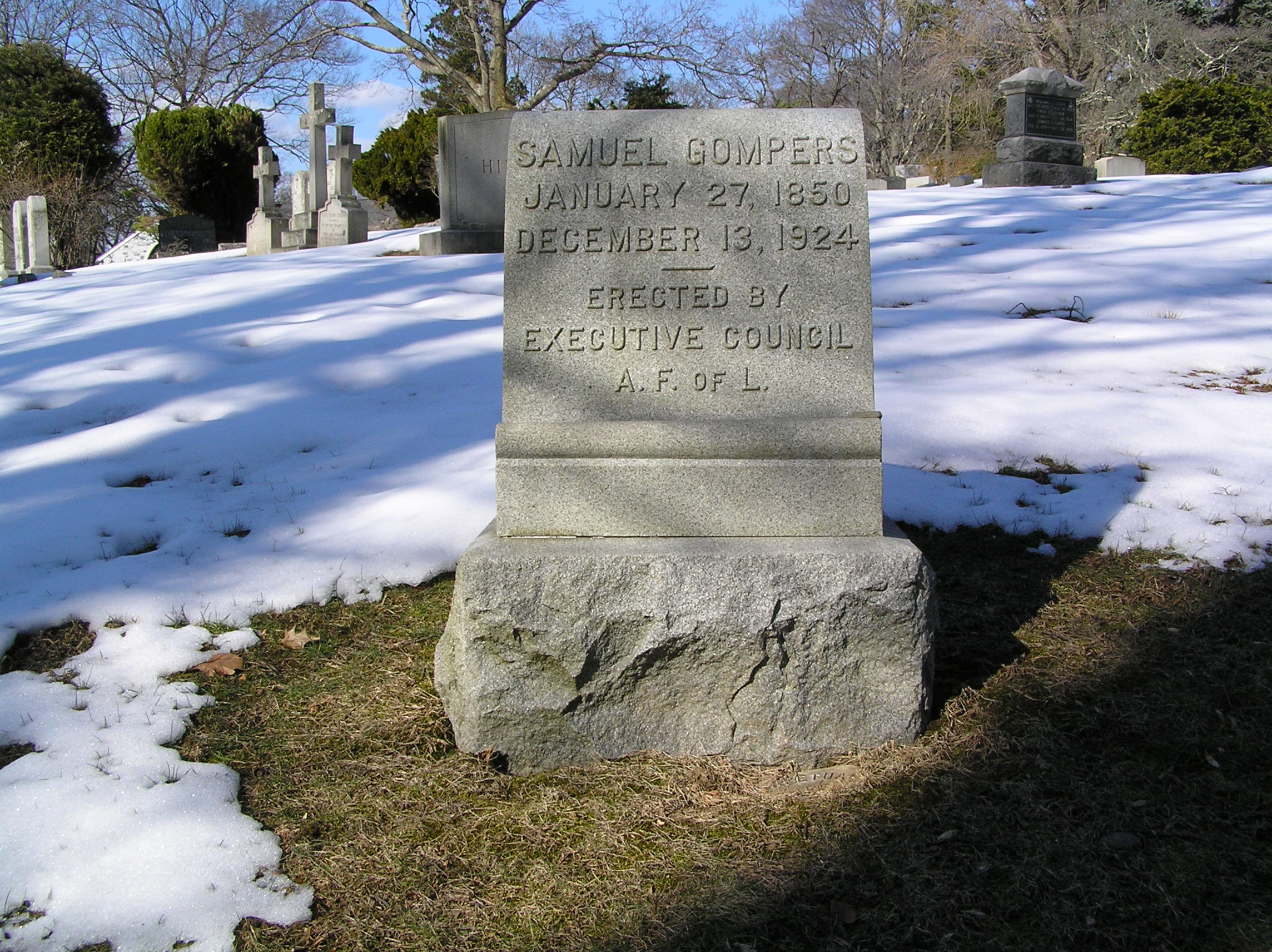
Samuel Gompers gravesite

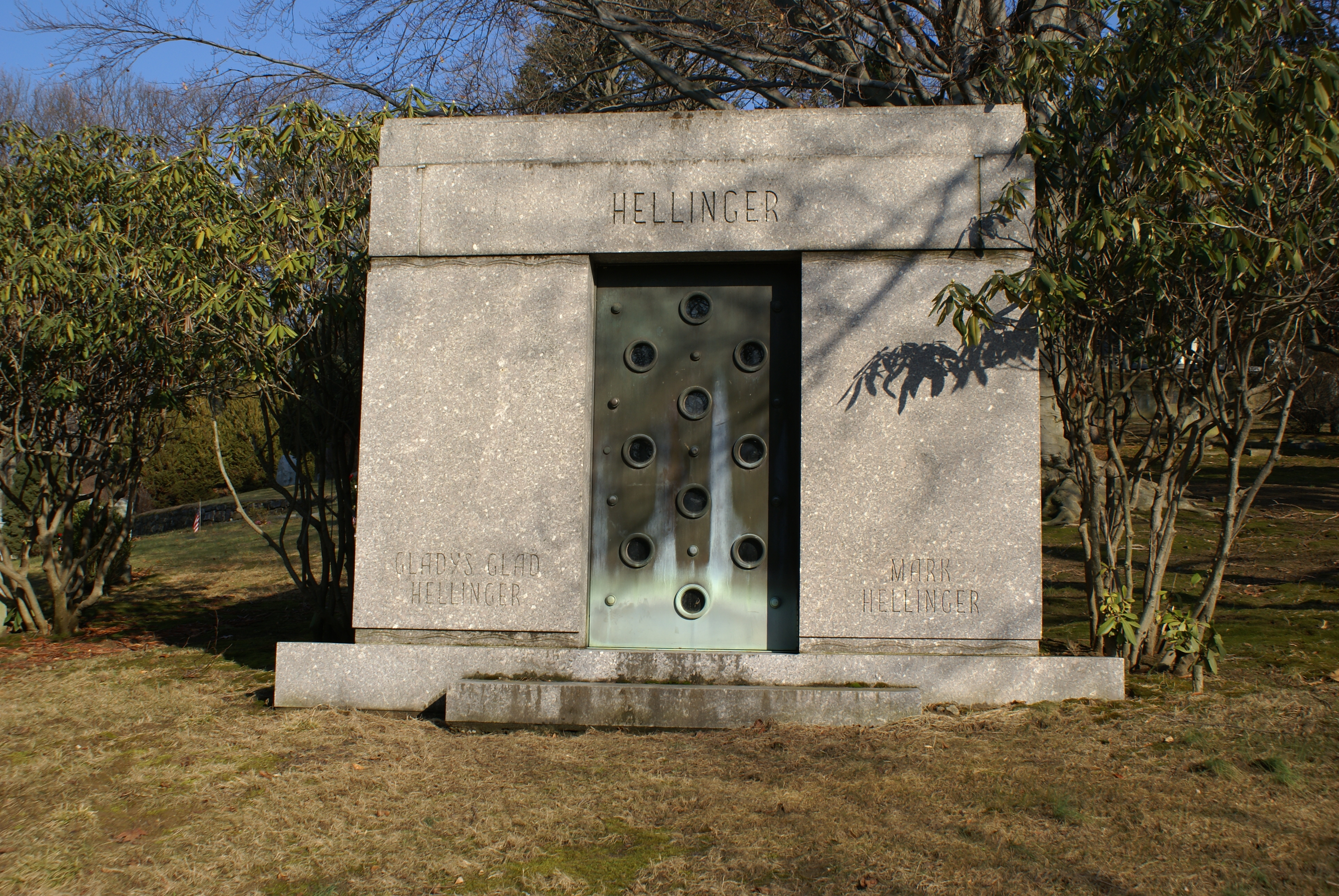
Mark Hellinger mausoleum

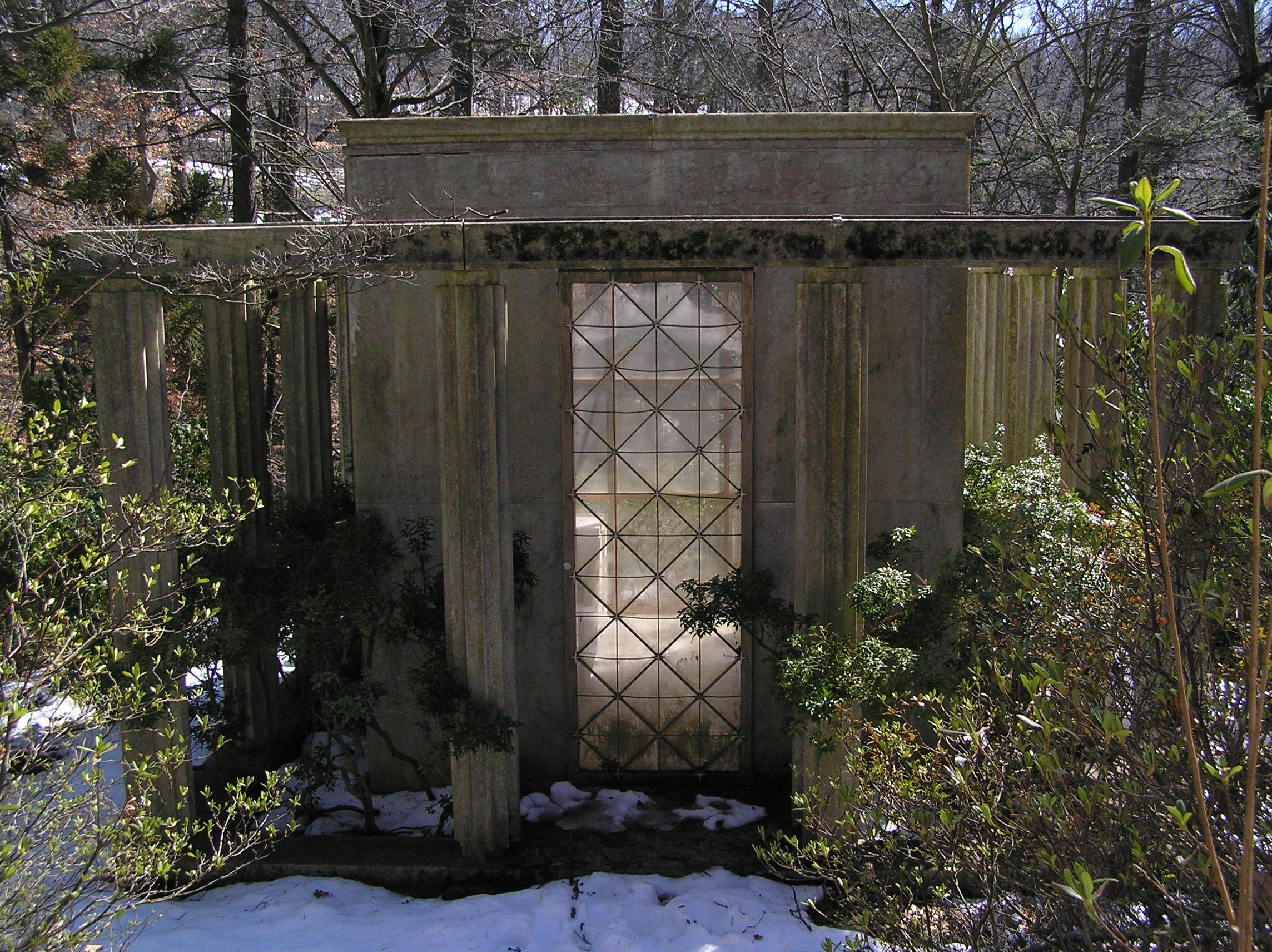
Albert Lasker mausoleum

== In popular culture ==
Several outdoor scenes from the feature film House of Dark Shadows (1970) were filmed at the cemetery's receiving vault. The cemetery also served as a location for the Ramones' 1989 music video "Pet Sematary".

== See also ==
- Old Dutch Church of Sleepy Hollow § Old Dutch Burying Ground
- List of rural cemeteries in the United States
