= The Paliser Case =

1920 film by William Parke

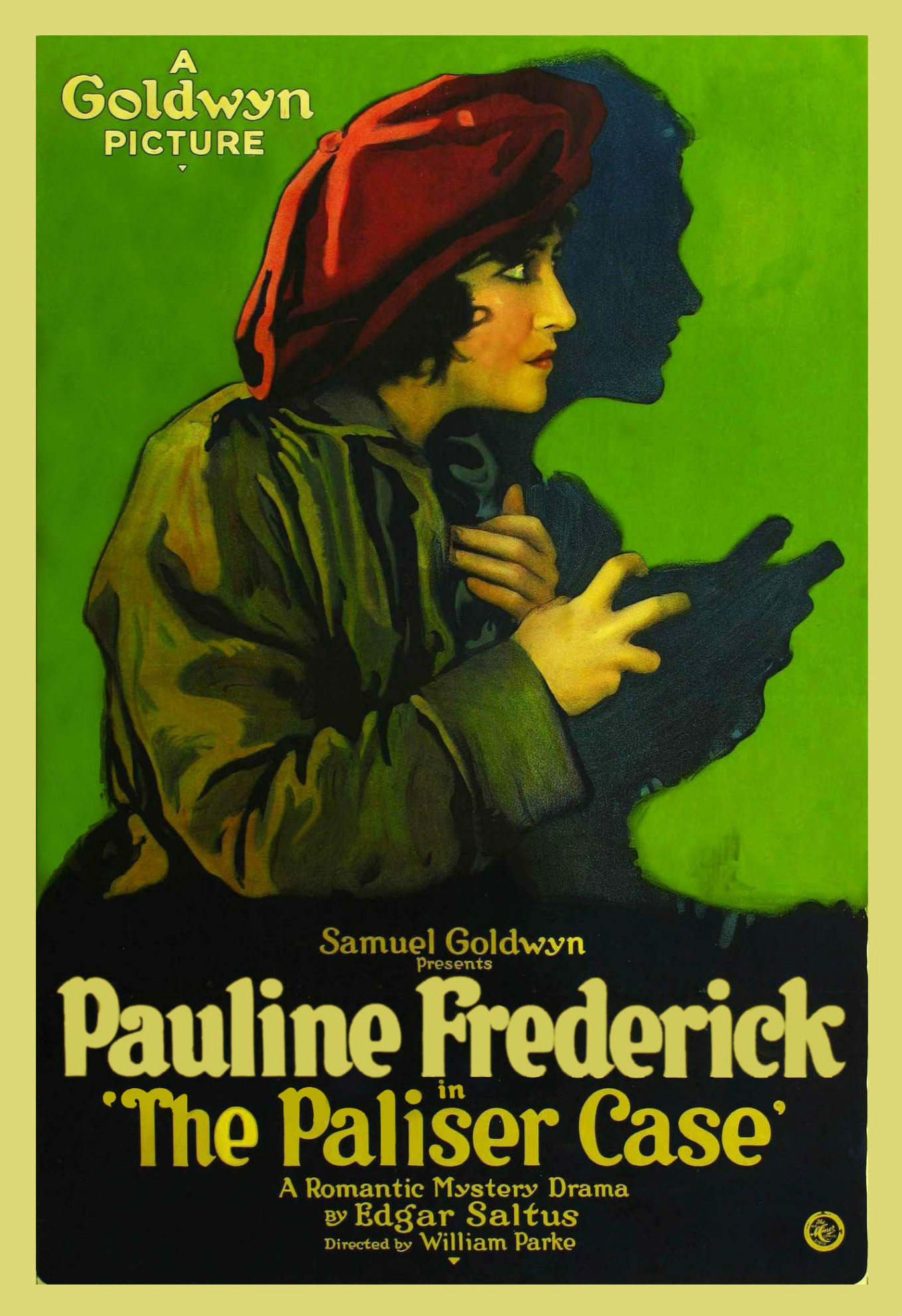
- Film poster
- Directed by: William Parke
- Written by: Edfrid A. Bingham
- Based on: The Paliser Case by Edgar Saltus
- Produced by: Samuel Goldwyn (executive producer)
- Starring: Pauline Frederick
- Cinematography: Edward Gheller
- Production company: Goldwyn Pictures Corp.
- Distributed by: Goldwyn Distributing Corp.
- Release date: February 15, 1920
- Running time: 50 minutes
- Country: United States
- Language: Silent (English intertitles)

The Paliser Case is a 1920 American silent mystery drama film produced and distributed by Goldwyn Pictures. Directed by William Parke, the film stars Pauline Frederick, Albert Roscoe, and James Neil. The film was adapted for the screen by Edfrid Bingham based on a 1919 novel of the same name by Edgar Saltus.

== Plot ==
As described in a film magazine, Cassy Cara, daughter of a Portuguese violinist whose talent has been obscured by a stroke following a holdup, attracts the attention of Monty Paliser, a man of wealth who, failing to win her by any other means, marries her. Three days after the wedding she learns that the ceremony was not genuine and returns home, telling her father her story. That night Paliser is murdered while in his box at the opera. A young man who Cassy has loved, who was seated in the next box, is accused of the murder and a chain of evidence is built up around him. To shield him, Cassy confesses to the crime. Then her father tells the truth that he is guilty. The film ends with the death of the father and the reuniting of Cassy and her young man.

== Cast ==
- Pauline Frederick as Cassy Cara
- Albert Roscoe as Lennox (credited as Albert Roscoe)
- James Neil as Cara
- Hazel Brennon as Margaret Austen (credited as Hazel Brennan)
- Kate Lester as Mrs. Austen
- Carrie Clark Ward as Tambourina
- Warburton Gamble as Monty Paliser
- Alec Francis as Paliser Sr.
- Eddie Sutherland as Jack Menzies
- Tom Ricketts as Major Archie Phipps
- Virginia Foltz as Mrs. Colquhuon

== Preservation ==
The Paliser Case is currently presumed lost. In February of 2021, the film was cited by the National Film Preservation Board on their Lost U.S. Silent Feature Films list.

== See also ==
- List of lost films

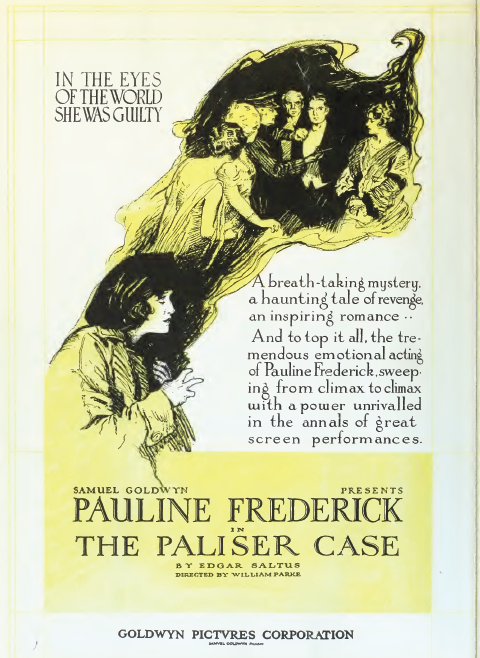
Ad for film
