= Francis Saltus Saltus =

American poet

Francis Saltus Saltus, from the frontispiece of the Witch of En-dor

Francis Saltus Saltus (November 23, 1849 – June 24, 1889) was an American poet.

== Biography ==
Born in 1849 in New York City to Francis Henry Saltus and his first wife, Julia Augustus Hubbard, he was the elder half-brother of once popular but now relatively obscure novelist Edgar Saltus. He was educated at Columbia University and later at the Roblot Institution in Paris. Saltus was the leader of a group of bohemians in New York, including his brother Edgar and the young James Huneker, which met at Billy Moulds' bar in Manhattan's University Place; they were fond of absinthe and had "a taste for anything exotic". Van Wyck Brooks remarked that the unhappy Saltus "looked like a Greek god gone to ruin, partly as a result of the absinthe that he drank to excess". His verse reflects a refined, erotic and decadent temperament similar to that of his brother, inspired primarily by Edgar Allan Poe, Théophile Gautier (of whom he was a student) and Charles Baudelaire. He was praised by influential editor William Marion Reedy as an 'American Baudelaire' whose verse had "the perfume of exquisite sadness." Able to converse in ten languages, Saltus also wrote poems in Italian, German and French.

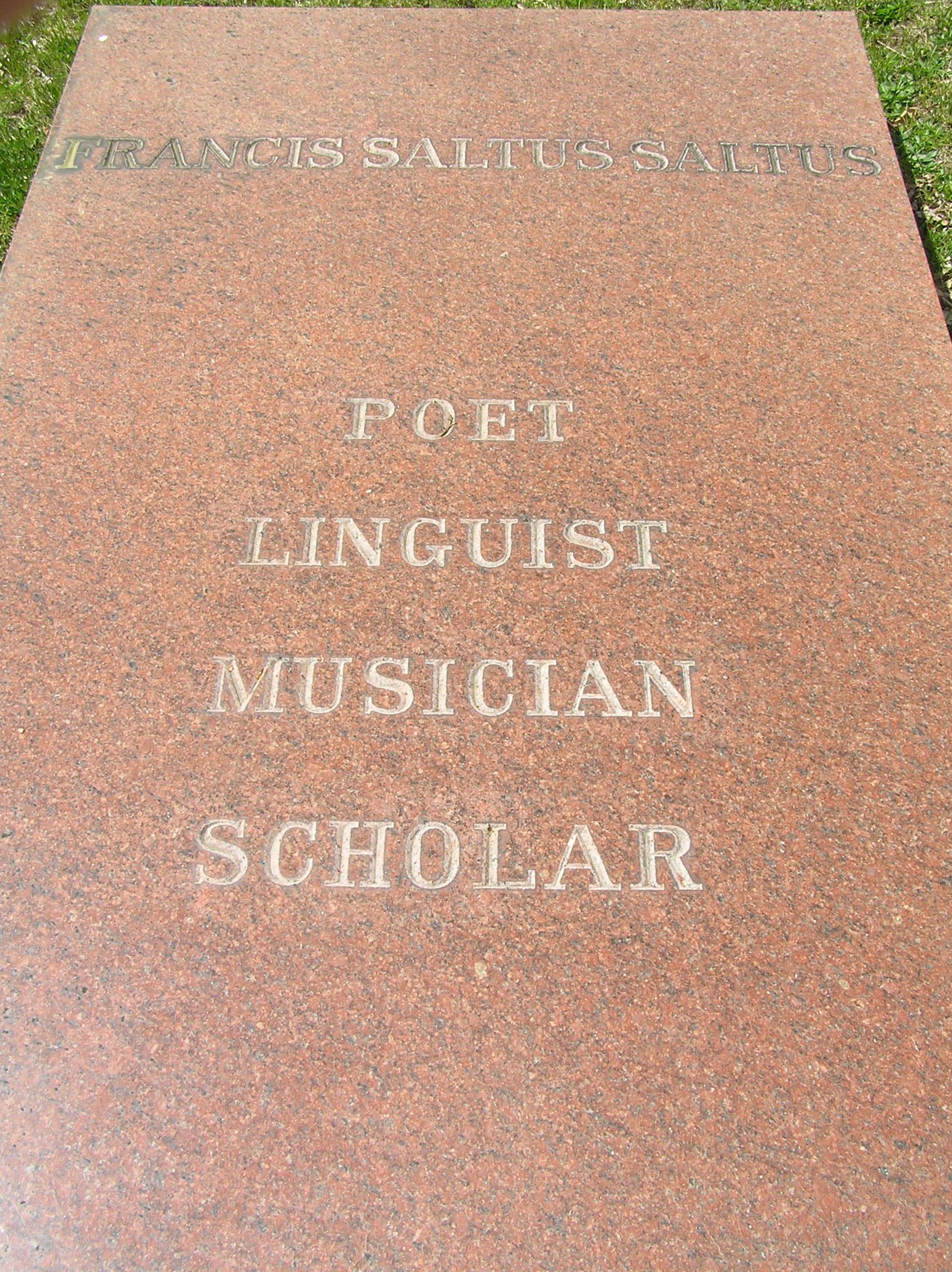
The monument of Francis Saltus Saltus in Sleepy Hollow Cemetery

He was a frequent contributor to American and international periodicals, such as Town Topics. A talented musician, he wrote four comic operas and much musical criticism. Much of his humorous, commercial work was written under the pseudonym Cupid Jones. Saltus wrote and edited a comic paper entitled the Thistle in the 1870s, the entire contents of which were written by him and signed with various pseudonyms. After an illness lasting several weeks, he died at midnight on June 24, 1889 at the Riverside Sanitarium in Tarrytown, aged thirty-nine and was buried in Sleepy Hollow Cemetery. Saltus' father, Francis H. Saltus, edited a four-volume edition of his poetical works after his death. Saltus left behind a good deal of unpublished material, including "five thousand lyrics for posthumous publication" and several musical biographies, including a life of Gaetano Donizetti.

== Bibliography ==
- Honey and Gall (1873)
- Shadows and Ideals (1890)
- The Witch of En-dor and Other Poems (1891)
- Dreams after Sunset (1892)
- Flasks and Flagons, Pastels and Profiles, Vistas and Landscapes (1892)
- The Bayadere and Other Sonnets (1894)
- Fact and Fancy (1895)
