= Edgar Saltus =

American writer (1855–1921)

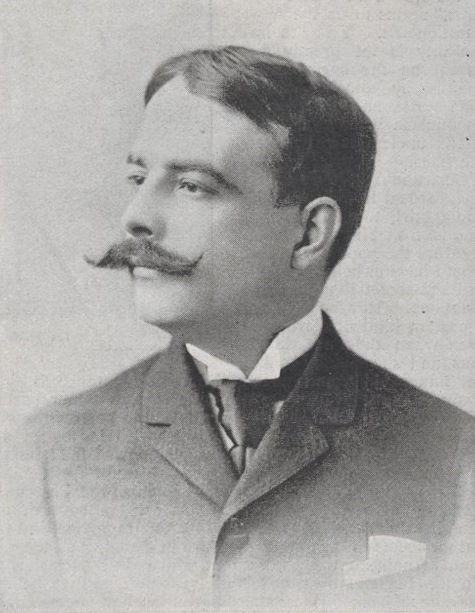
- Born: Edgar Evertson Saltus; October 8, 1855; New York City, U.S.
- Died: July 31, 1921 (aged 65); New York City, U.S.
- Resting place: Sleepy Hollow Cemetery
- Education: Yale University; Columbia Law School
- Occupations: Biographer; essayist; historian; novelist; poet
- Spouses: Helen Sturgis Read (m. 1883; div. 1891) Elsie Welch Smith (m. 1895; died 1911) Marie Flores Giles (m. 1911)
- Relatives: Francis Saltus Saltus (half-brother)
- Writing career
- Period: 1884–1921
- Movement: Decadent movement

Edgar Evertson Saltus (October 8, 1855 – July 31, 1921) was an American writer known for his highly refined prose style. His works paralleled those by European decadent authors such as Joris-Karl Huysmans, Gabriele D'Annunzio and Oscar Wilde.

Under the pseudonym Myndart Verelst, Saltus translated works by Balzac, Théophile Gautier, and Prosper Mérimée; he also wrote using the name Archibald Wilberforce.

== Early life and education ==
Edgar Saltus was born in New York City on October 8, 1855, to Francis Henry Saltus and his second wife, Eliza Evertson, both of Dutch descent. He attended St. Paul's in Concord, New Hampshire. After two semesters at Yale University, Saltus entered Columbia Law School in 1878, graduating with a law degree in 1880.

== Career ==
He wrote two books on philosophy: The Philosophy of Disenchantment (1885) focused on philosophical pessimism and in particular the philosophy of Schopenhauer and Eduard von Hartmann, while The Anatomy of Negation (1886) tried "to convey a tableau of anti-theism from Kapila to Leconte de Lisle".

After a conversion experience, the once anti-theist and pessimist credited Ralph Waldo Emerson with having transformed his views. In an 1896 Collier's column, he wrote, "I began to see, and what to me was even more marvelous, I began to think." In time, he became a member of the Theosophical Society, an organization that studied, synthesized and experimented with the more esoteric concepts and practices of world religions.

== Personal life ==
Saltus was married three times. He married his first wife, Helen Sturgis Read, in 1883 (divorced, 1891). At the church in the English Embassy in Paris, he married in 1895 Elsie Welch Smith (separated, 1901; died, 1911). Saltus married his third wife, author Marie Flores Giles, in 1911. Saltus had a three-year love affair in the 1890s with heiress Aimée Crocker, confirmed in her memoir And I'd Do It Again (1936).

Saltus and his first wife appeared in the 1887 first edition of the New York, Social Register.

His elder half-brother Francis Saltus Saltus was a minor poet. Both brothers are buried in Sleepy Hollow Cemetery in Sleepy Hollow, New York.

== Legacy ==
Acclaimed by fellow writers in his day, Saltus fell into obscurity after his death.

His novel The Paliser Case was adapted to film in 1920, and his novel Daughters of the Rich was filmed in 1923.

Edgar Saltus: The Man, a biography by Marie Saltus, Edgar's third wife, was published in 1925. Edgar Saltus, a critical study by Claire Sprague, appeared in 1968.

The writer and photographer Carl Van Vechten, was instrumental in convincing Saltus's daughter, Elsie Saltus Munds, to donate to Yale what is now known as the Edgar Saltus Papers, consisting of thirty-eight first editions, two of them inscribed, and eighteen letters written in 1918.

A descendant through his wife Elsie, French-born James de Beaujeu Domville, was a major theatrical producer and Canadian cultural commissioner focused on the film industry.

== Works ==
=== Essays, history, and philosophy ===
- Balzac. Boston: Houghton, Mifflin. 1884.
- The Philosophy of Disenchantment. New York: Belford, 1885.
- The Anatomy of Negation. London: Williams and Norgate, 1886.
- Love and Lore. New York: Belford, 1890.
- Imperial Purple. Chicago: Morrill, Higgins, 1892.
- The Pomps of Satan. London: Greening, 1904.
- Historia Amoris. New York: Mitchell Kennerley, 1906.
- The Lords of the Ghostland. New York: Mitchell Kennerley, 1907
- Oscar Wilde: An Idler’s Impression. Chicago: Brothers of the Book, 1917.
- The Imperial Orgy. New York: Boni and Liveright, 1920.
- The Gardens of Aphrodite. Philadelphia: Pennell Club, 1920.
- Parnassians Personally Encountered. Cedar Rapids: Torch Press, 1923.
- The Uplands of Dream. Chicago: Pascal Covici, 1925 (Compilation of sixteen essays published in magazines between 1900 and 1914).
- Victor Hugo and Golgotha. Chicago: Pascal Covici, 1925.
- The Philosophical Writings of Edgar Saltus: The Philosophy of Disenchantment & The Anatomy of Negation (2014) ISBN 9780988553644

=== Fiction ===
- Mr. Incoul’s Misadventure. New York: Benjamin and Bell, 1887.
- The Truth About Tristrem Varick. Chicago: Belford, Clarke, 1888.
- Eden. Chicago: Belford, Clark, 1888.
- A Transaction in Hearts. New York: Belford, Clarke, 1889.
- A Transient Guest and Other Episodes. New York: Belford, Clarke, 1889.
- The Pace That Kills. Chicago: Belford, Clarke, 1889.
- Mary Magdalen. New York: Belford, 1891.
- The Facts In The Curious Case of Hugh Hyrtl, Esq. New York: P.F. Collier, 1892.
- Madam Sapphira. New York: F. Tennyson Neely, 1893.
- Enthralled. London: Tudor Press, 1894.
- When Dreams Come True. New York: P. F. Collier, 1895.
- Purple and Fine Women. New York; Ainslee, 1903.
- The Perfume of Eros. New York: A. Wessels, 1905.
- Vanity Square. Philadelphia: Lippincott, 1906.
- Daughters of the Rich. New York: Mitchell Kennerley, 1909.
- The Monster. New York: Pulitzer, 1912.
- The Paliser Case. New York: Boni and Liveright, 1919.
- The Ghost Girl. New York: Boni and Liveright, 1922.
- The Princess of the Sun and Other Decadent Stories. Snuggly Books, 2022. ISBN 9781645250999

=== Poetry ===
- Poppies and Mandragora. New York: Harold Vinal, 1926.

=== Translations ===
- Balzac: After-Dinner Stories [as Myndart Verelst]. New York: George J. Coombes, 1886.
- Merimee, Prosper and Theophile Gautier. Tales Before Supper [as Myndart Verelst]. New York: Brentano's, 1887.
- Barbey d’Aurevilly. Story Without A Name. Chicago: Belford, 1891; New York: Brentano's, 1919 (new introduction).

Adapted from the author bibliography that appears in Edgar Saltus by Claire Sprague.
