= Madison, New Jersey =

Borough in Morris County, New Jersey, US

- Borough
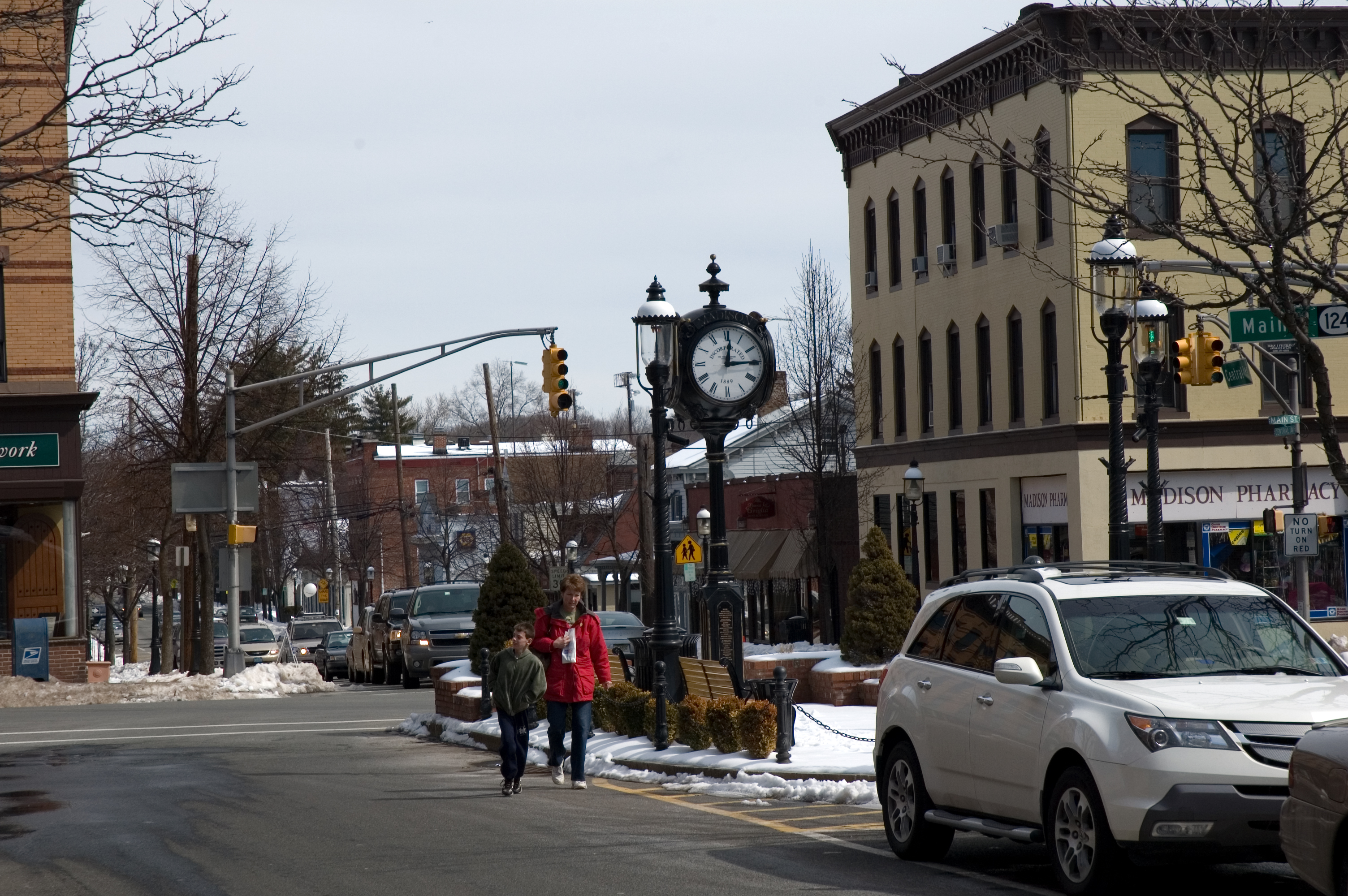
- Main Street in Downtown Madison

- Seal
- Nickname: The Rose City
- Location of Madison in Morris County highlighted in red (right). Inset map: Location of Morris County in New Jersey highlighted in orange (left)

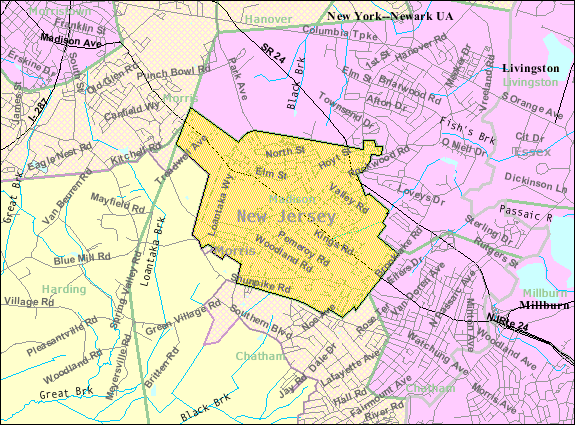
- Census Bureau map of Madison, New Jersey

- Location in Morris County Location in New Jersey Location in the United States
- Coordinates: 40.758044°N 74.417807°W
- Country: United States
- State: New Jersey
- County: Morris
- Incorporated: December 27, 1889
- Named for: President James Madison

Government
  - Type: Borough
  - Body: Borough Council
  - Mayor: Robert H. Conley (D, term ends December 31, 2027)
  - Administrator: Raymond M. Codey
  - Municipal clerk: Elizabeth Osborne

Area
  - Total: 4.32 sq mi (11.20 km^{2})
  - Land: 4.31 sq mi (11.17 km^{2})
  - Water: 0.012 sq mi (0.03 km^{2}) 0.30%
  - Rank: 288th of 565 in state 24th of 39 in county
- Elevation: 266 ft (81 m)

Population (2020)
  - Total: 16,937
  - Estimate (2024): 16,555
  - Rank: 158th of 565 in state 13th of 39 in county
  - Density: 3,926.6/sq mi (1,516.1/km^{2})
  - Rank: 165th of 565 in state 6th of 39 in county
- Time zone: UTC−05:00 (Eastern (EST))
  - Summer (DST): UTC−04:00 (Eastern (EDT))
- ZIP Code: 07940
- Area code: 973
- FIPS code: 3402742510
- GNIS feature ID: 0885287
- Website: www.rosenet.org

Madison is a borough in Morris County, in the U.S. state of New Jersey. As of the 2020 United States census, the borough's population was 16,937, an increase of 1,092 (+6.9%) from the 2010 census count of 15,845, which in turn reflected a drop in population of 685 (−4.1%) from the 16,530 counted in the 2000 census.

Madison is noted for its historic railroad station, which is located on the Morris & Essex Lines, one of the nation's first commuter railroads. Many wealthy residents of Manhattan relocated to Madison and its surrounding communities since the rail line offered direct transport to New York City. Madison is known as "the Rose City" and was named in honor of President James Madison.

Madison was ranked 33rd in Money magazine's ranking of the "Best Places to Live" in 2011, the third-highest-ranked location in New Jersey and second-highest in Morris County behind Montville. New Jersey Monthly ranked Madison first in its 2019 rankings of the "Best Places to Live" in New Jersey.

Madison is a college town, the home of both Drew University and Fairleigh Dickinson University; Saint Elizabeth University is located in neighboring Convent Station, New Jersey. Madison is also home to the Shakespeare Theatre of New Jersey, one of the largest professional Shakespeare companies in North America.

== History ==
=== Pre-settlement ===
Native Americans occupied present-day Madison and most of New Jersey for several thousand years, following the retreat of the Wisconsin Glacier. Lenape settlements in present-day Madison were agriculturally based following matrilineal lines. The protected lands nearby, Jockey Hollow, are what is remaining of the settlement. Occupation changed with the seasons, the variable nature of the climate, and to preserve the fertility of the rich soil. Their fishing and hunting territories were wide-ranging and similarly divided among the three clans of the matrilineal culture in this Eastern Woodland environment. Trade with these native peoples for food and furs was conducted by the Dutch during the period of colonization of New Netherland. Although the European principle of land ownership was not recognized by the Lenape, Dutch West India Company policy required their colonists to purchase land that they settled, but typically, trading relationships were established in this area, rather than Dutch settlements.

=== 18th century ===
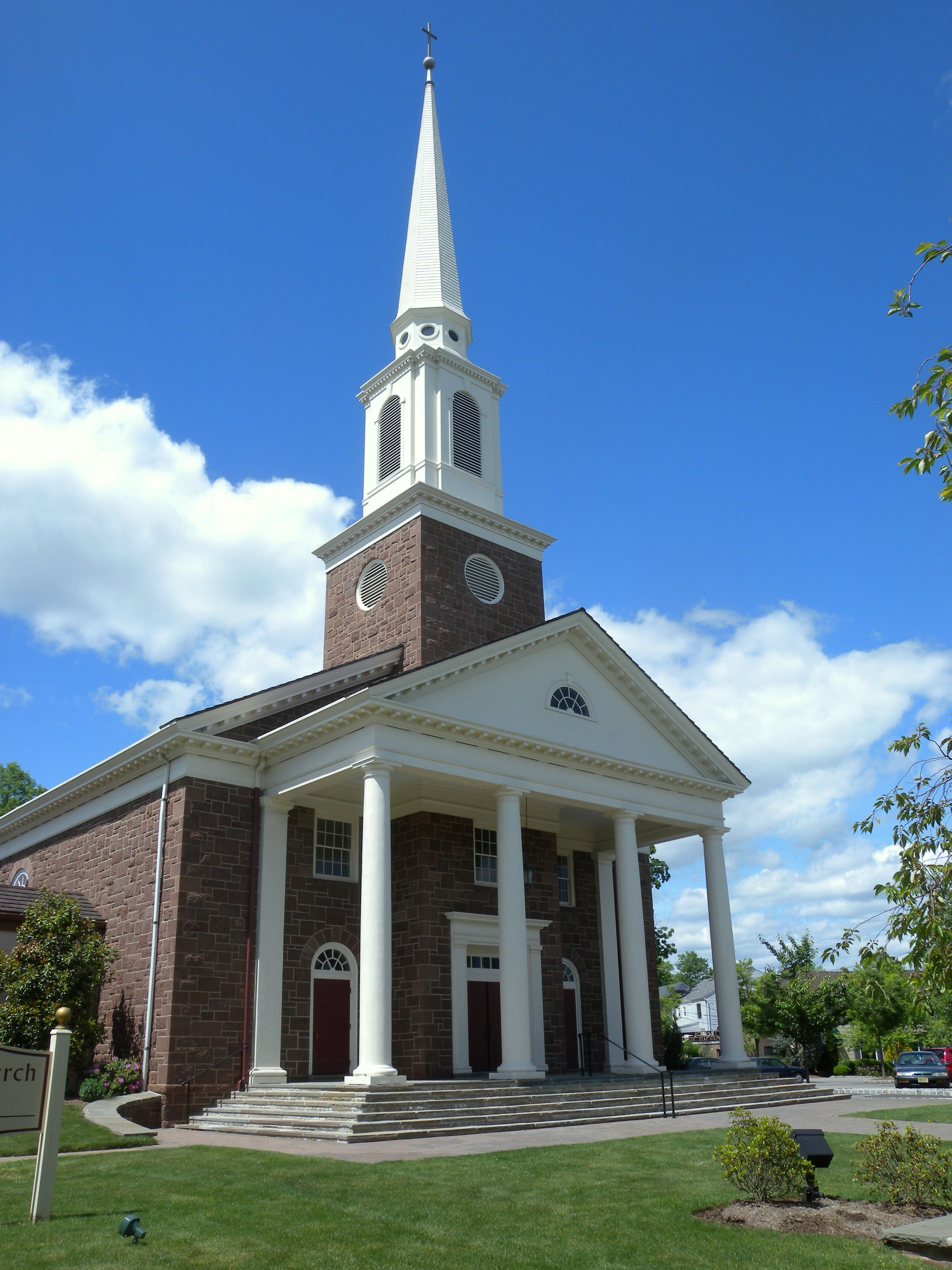
The Presbyterian Church of Madison

During the British colonial period of the 17th and 18th centuries, the earliest settlers arriving in Madison were of European descent in what was then the colonial-era Province of New Jersey. Traditional native trails and pathways were followed as settlement began. Pressures upon the Lenape constantly drove them westward.

In or around 1715, Bottle Hill, a village, was established at the crossing of Ridgedale Avenue and Kings Road. Village governance principles followed the British model. The Luke Miller house at 105 Ridgedale Avenue is thought to be the oldest remaining home, having been built around 1730. During British colonial rule, Kings Road was a toll road that assessed fees levied by the government appointed by the English king. Farther south was the Shunpike, a road with a parallel path that was used by colonists to avoid the fees.

Morris County was established in 1739 and was divided into three townships. The portion of the village north of Kings Road was put under the governance of Hanover Township and the portion to the south, under the governance of Morris Township. A meeting house for the Presbyterian Church of South Hanover, as Madison was then called, was started in 1747, where the Presbyterian Cemetery still exists between Kings Road and Madison Avenue. With the Treaty of Easton in 1758, the Lenape were required to vacate their lands in colonial New Jersey and to move westward. Their leaders allied with the colonists during the American Revolutionary War in hopes of regaining former lands, but those hopes were never realized.

Following the American Revolution, changes to governing the former colonies occurred gradually as the new nation organized. The state of New Jersey formed its government and debated best policies.

=== 19th century ===
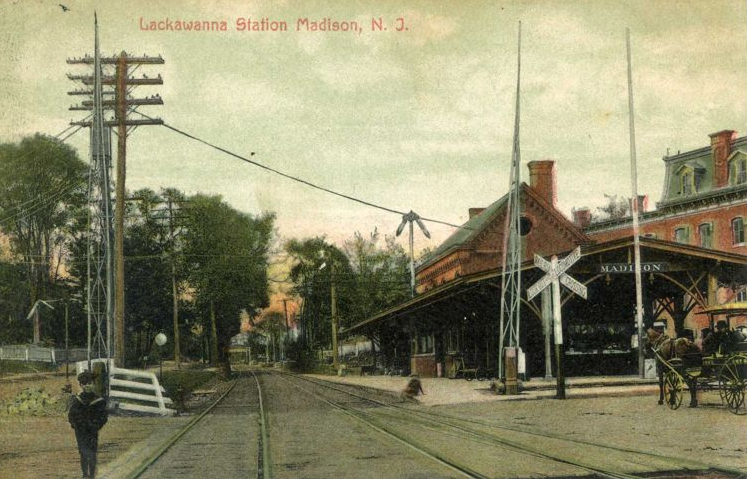
Madison station prior to 1916

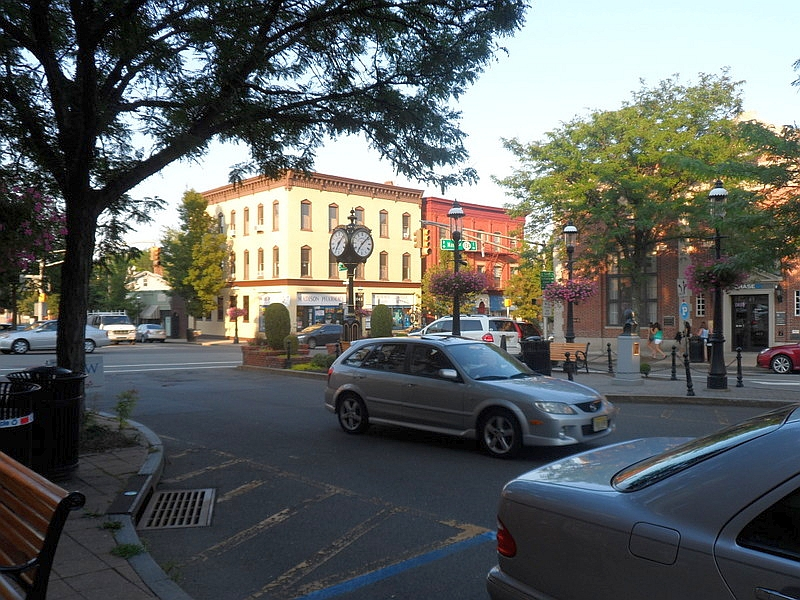
Downtown Madison

During a reorganization of Morris County in 1806, Chatham Township was established and included all of present-day Chatham Township and the three pre-Revolutionary War villages of Chatham, Florham Park, and Madison, which were still governed by Chatham Township, and ended the governmental division of Bottle Hill.

In 1834, the name of the settlement was changed to Madison. As a tribute to the name, every year a fair called Bottle Hill Day is held.

In 1838, the Morris and Essex Railroad Line was founded, connecting Newark and Hoboken and providing transportation for farm produce grown in Madison. The railroad made possible the establishment of a flourishing rose growing industry, still commemorated in Madison's nickname, the Rose City. The rail service connected the commerce to the markets of Manhattan] Madison's growth accelerated after the Civil War and the Morris and Essex Lines became one of America's first commuter railroads, attracting well-to-do families from Manhattan (many of whom already owned large parcels land in the area for farming, hunting, and recreation) and contributing to the development of "Millionaire's Row", which stretched from downtown Madison to downtown Morristown. Greenhouses dotted the countryside. Talented horticulturalists were attracted to the area for employment at the many wealthy estates in the immediate area and to establish related businesses. One of the first grand houses to be built on Millionaire's Row was the Ross Estate. In 1893, Florence Adele Vanderbilt and her husband Hamilton McKown Twombly began to build the impressive Florham estate. The estate name is a portmanteau of their first names, Florence and Hamilton. Home to Fairleigh Dickinson University, Florham is a Gilded Age mansion and the 9th largest house in the United States.

On December 27, 1889, based on the results of a referendum passed on December 24, 1889, the village seceded from Chatham Township and adopted the newly created borough government (when it first became available) to develop a local water supply system for its population of 3,250. Madison annexed additional portions of Chatham Township in 1891, and again each year from 1894 to 1898, which was followed by an exchange of certain lands in 1899 with Chatham Township.

Madison's historic railroad station was funded by the community, which passed an ordinance authorizing $159,000 for railroad improvement bonds. The result, with the cooperation of the D.L. & W.R.R. in the planning, was completed in 1916. The tracks were elevated through the downtown so that no established roadways were hindered by crossing delays. Mrs. D. Willis James financed much of the road grading caused by the elevation of the tracks. The station included baggage and cargo facilities readily accessible by wagon, as well as the stationmaster offices, a newsstand, and waiting facilities featuring extensive banks of high-backed wooden seating. Weeping mulberry trees were planted among the landscaping and in natural areas in the parking area.

The rose industry and the large estates in the area attracted working-class people of all kinds. As a result, Madison developed a diverse population very early, both in terms of socioeconomic status and ethnic background. The original settlers were of British stock; French settlers came after the American Revolution; African Americans have been members of the community from early in the 19th century; Irish came in the mid-19th century; and then Germans and Italians arrived around the turn of the 20th century. To this day, a substantial population of Italian descent remain in Madison. Madison remains a diverse community, with recent newcomers arriving from Central America, South America, and Asia. Madison is a railroad suburb of New York City.

=== 20th century ===
The Evergreen Cemetery was mentioned in Weird NJ for an incident in 1902, when after a downpour, bodies were found on the streets.

== Geography ==
According to the U.S. Census Bureau, the borough had a total area of 4.33 square miles (11.20 km^{2}), including 4.31 square miles (11.17 km^{2}) of land and 0.01 square miles (0.03 km^{2}) of water (0.30%). Madison is located about 25 miles (40 km) west of downtown Manhattan, and is a suburban town of New York City.

Madison borders the Morris County municipalities of Chatham Borough to the east, Chatham Township to the south, Harding Township and Morris Township to the west and Florham Park to the north.

Unincorporated communities, localities and place names located partially or completely within the borough include Brooklake Park, East Madison and North Park.

Climate data for Madison, New Jersey
Month	Jan	Feb	Mar	Apr	May	Jun	Jul	Aug	Sep	Oct	Nov	Dec	Year
Record high °F (°C)	73 (23)	76 (24)	89 (32)	96 (36)	97 (36)	102 (39)	103 (39)	104 (40)	99 (37)	93 (34)	84 (29)	76 (24)	104 (40)
Mean daily maximum °F (°C)	39 (4)	42 (6)	51 (11)	62 (17)	73 (23)	82 (28)	86 (30)	85 (29)	78 (26)	66 (19)	55 (13)	44 (7)	64 (18)
Mean daily minimum °F (°C)	18 (−8)	20 (−7)	28 (−2)	38 (3)	47 (8)	57 (14)	63 (17)	61 (16)	53 (12)	40 (4)	32 (0)	24 (−4)	40 (4)
Record low °F (°C)	−25 (−32)	−26 (−32)	−6 (−21)	12 (−11)	25 (−4)	31 (−1)	41 (5)	35 (2)	26 (−3)	13 (−11)	−5 (−21)	−16 (−27)	−26 (−32)
Average precipitation inches (mm)	3.54 (90)	2.91 (74)	4.20 (107)	4.29 (109)	4.38 (111)	4.70 (119)	4.73 (120)	4.42 (112)	4.89 (124)	4.65 (118)	4.06 (103)	4.13 (105)	50.9 (1,292)
Source: Weather Channel

== Demographics ==
Historical population
Census	Pop.	Note	%±
1880	1,756		—
1890	2,469		40.6%
1900	3,754		52.0%
1910	4,658		24.1%
1920	5,523		18.6%
1930	7,481		35.5%
1940	7,944		6.2%
1950	10,417		31.1%
1960	15,122		45.2%
1970	16,710		10.5%
1980	15,357		−8.1%
1990	15,850		3.2%
2000	16,530		4.3%
2010	15,845		−4.1%
2020	16,937		6.9%
2024 (est.)	16,555	▼	−2.3%
U.S. Decennial Census; 1880–1890 1890–1920; 1890–1910 1890–1930; 1940–2000 2000; 2010 2020

=== 2020 census ===
As of the 2020 census, Madison had a population of 16,937. The population density was 3,927.0 inhabitants per square mile (1,516.2/km^{2}). The median age was 37.8 years. 23.0% of residents were under the age of 18 and 14.2% of residents were 65 years of age or older. For every 100 females there were 93.0 males, and for every 100 females age 18 and over there were 88.7 males age 18 and over.

99.9% of residents lived in urban areas, while 0.1% lived in rural areas.

There were 5,705 households and 3,931 families in Madison, of which 37.6% had children under the age of 18 living in them. Of all households, 57.9% were married-couple households, 13.3% were households with a male householder and no spouse or partner present, and 24.3% were households with a female householder and no spouse or partner present. About 24.4% of all households were made up of individuals and 11.6% had someone living alone who was 65 years of age or older.

There were 5,989 housing units, of which 4.7% were vacant. The homeowner vacancy rate was 1.1% and the rental vacancy rate was 4.4%.

Racial composition as of the 2020 census
Race	Number	Percent
White	12,829	75.7%
Black or African American	499	2.9%
American Indian and Alaska Native	27	0.2%
Asian	1,272	7.5%
Native Hawaiian and Other Pacific Islander	7	0.0%
Some other race	618	3.6%
Two or more races	1,685	9.9%
Hispanic or Latino (of any race)	2,004	11.8%

=== 2010 census ===
The 2010 United States census counted 15,845 people, 5,485 households, and 3,675 families in the borough. The population density was 3,767.9 per square mile (1,454.8/km^{2}). There were 5,775 housing units at an average density of 1,373.3 per square mile (530.2/km^{2}). The racial makeup was 86.75% (13,746) White, 2.96% (469) Black or African American, 0.12% (19) Native American, 5.51% (873) Asian, 0.01% (2) Pacific Islander, 2.34% (371) from other races, and 2.30% (365) from two or more races. Hispanic or Latino of any race were 8.87% (1,406) of the population.

Of the 5,485 households, 34.5% had children under the age of 18; 56.0% were married couples living together; 8.7% had a female householder with no husband present and 33.0% were non-families. Of all households, 27.2% were made up of individuals and 11.4% had someone living alone who was 65 years of age or older. The average household size was 2.58 and the average family size was 3.19.

23.7% of the population were under the age of 18, 13.6% from 18 to 24, 23.7% from 25 to 44, 24.7% from 45 to 64, and 14.2% who were 65 years of age or older. The median age was 38.0 years. For every 100 females, the population had 89.9 males. For every 100 females ages 18 and older there were 85.3 males.

The Census Bureau's 2006–2010 American Community Survey showed that (in 2010 inflation-adjusted dollars) median household income was $106,070 (with a margin of error of +/− $8,499) and the median family income was $139,886 (+/− $18,117). Males had a median income of $100,289 (+/− $12,722) versus $64,684 (+/− $10,127) for females. The per capita income for the borough was $54,518 (+/− $4,561). About 1.1% of families and 4.3% of the population were below the poverty line, including 1.6% of those under age 18 and 2.7% of those age 65 or over.

=== 2000 census ===
As of the 2000 United States census there were 16,530 people, 5,520 households, and 3,786 families. The population density was 3,935.6 inhabitants per square mile (1,519.5/km^{2}). There were 5,641 housing units at an average density of 1,343.1 per square mile (518.6/km^{2}). The racial makeup of the population was 89.69% White, 3.00% African American, 0.13% Native American, 3.77% Asian, 0.23% Pacific Islander, 1.55% from other races, and 1.63% from two or more races. Hispanic or Latino of any race were 5.97% of the population.

There were 5,520 households, out of which 31.3% had children under the age of 18 living with them, 57.6% were married couples living together, 8.2% had a female householder with no husband present, and 31.4% were non-families. 25.6% of all households were made up of individuals, and 10.0% had someone living alone who was 65 years of age or older. The average household size was 2.53 and the average family size was 3.05.

The age distribution of the population shows 20.6% under the age of 18, 17.6% from 18 to 24, 28.3% from 25 to 44, 20.5% from 45 to 64, and 13.0% who were 65 years of age or older. The median age was 34 years. For every 100 females, there were 90.0 males. For every 100 females age 18 and over, there were 86.7 males.

The median income for a household was $82,847 and the median income for a family was $101,798. Males had a median income of $62,303 versus $42,097 for females. The per capita income was $38,416. About 2.0% of families and 3.4% of the population were below the poverty line, including 2.8% of those under age 18 and 4.3% of those age 65 or over.

== Economy ==
Madison's downtown is supported by the Madison Downtown Development Commission and a downtown manager. Many historical buildings remain in the community. The Madison Civic Commercial Historic District, which includes much of "downtown" as well as the borough hall and the train station, is listed on the State Register of Historic Places. The borough hall was donated to the community by Geraldine R. Dodge and Marcellus Hartley Dodge Sr. as a memorial to their son who died in an automobile crash shortly after his graduation from Princeton University. Commercial vacancy rates are low. In recent years Madison has become noted for the number and quality of its restaurants.

Giralda Farms, a planned office development, occupies 175 acres (0.71 km^{2}) of the former Geraldine R. Dodge estate in Madison The site includes the corporate headquarters of Quest Diagnostics. Covering 181 acres (73 ha), the site requires that all parking be underground and that 85% of the land be undeveloped.

== Arts and culture ==
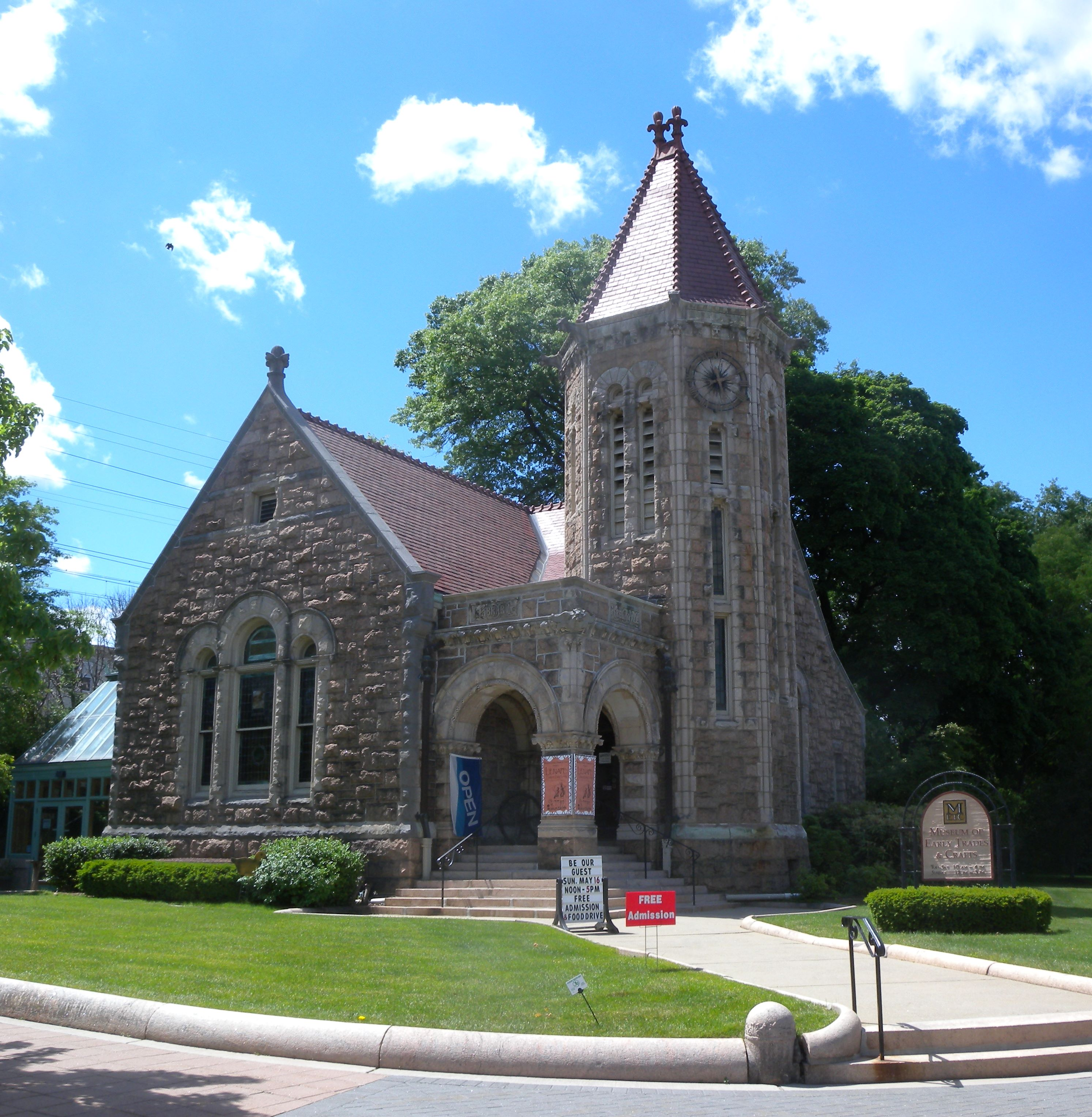
Museum of Early Trades and Crafts

Madison holds an annual event, Bottle Hill Day, during which the community is able to celebrate with games, food, music, and a variety of activities for as many as 20,000 participants.

Madison is home to the Shakespeare Theatre of New Jersey, one of 25 professional theatres in the state. Serving 100,000 adults and children annually, it is New Jersey's only professional theatre company dedicated to Shakespeare's canon and other classic masterworks. The F.M. Kirby Shakespeare Theatre, the company's main stage, is a short walk from Madison's downtown shopping district.

Madison is also home to the Museum of Early Trades and Crafts, a New Jersey history museum located in the historic downtown district. The building is listed on both the state and national registers of historic buildings. The museum houses a collection of more than 8,000 artifacts and is host to thousands of visitors each year, mostly school students on field trips. The museum was used as a filming location for the upcoming Adam Sandler Netflix film Grown Ups 3, where it was renamed to the "Mini Museum".

In October 2017, it was announced that a long-lost sculpture by Auguste Rodin had been found in the Hartley Dodge Memorial. A student from Drew University, who had been hired to archive the art in the building, discovered the bust of Napoleon and reached out to the Comité Auguste Rodin in Paris to have it authenticated. A public viewing was held for locals before the statue was loaned to the Philadelphia Museum of Art. In 2023, a portrait of Abraham Lincoln, researched by the same Drew student, was placed on loan to the National Portrait Gallery.

== Government ==
=== Local government ===
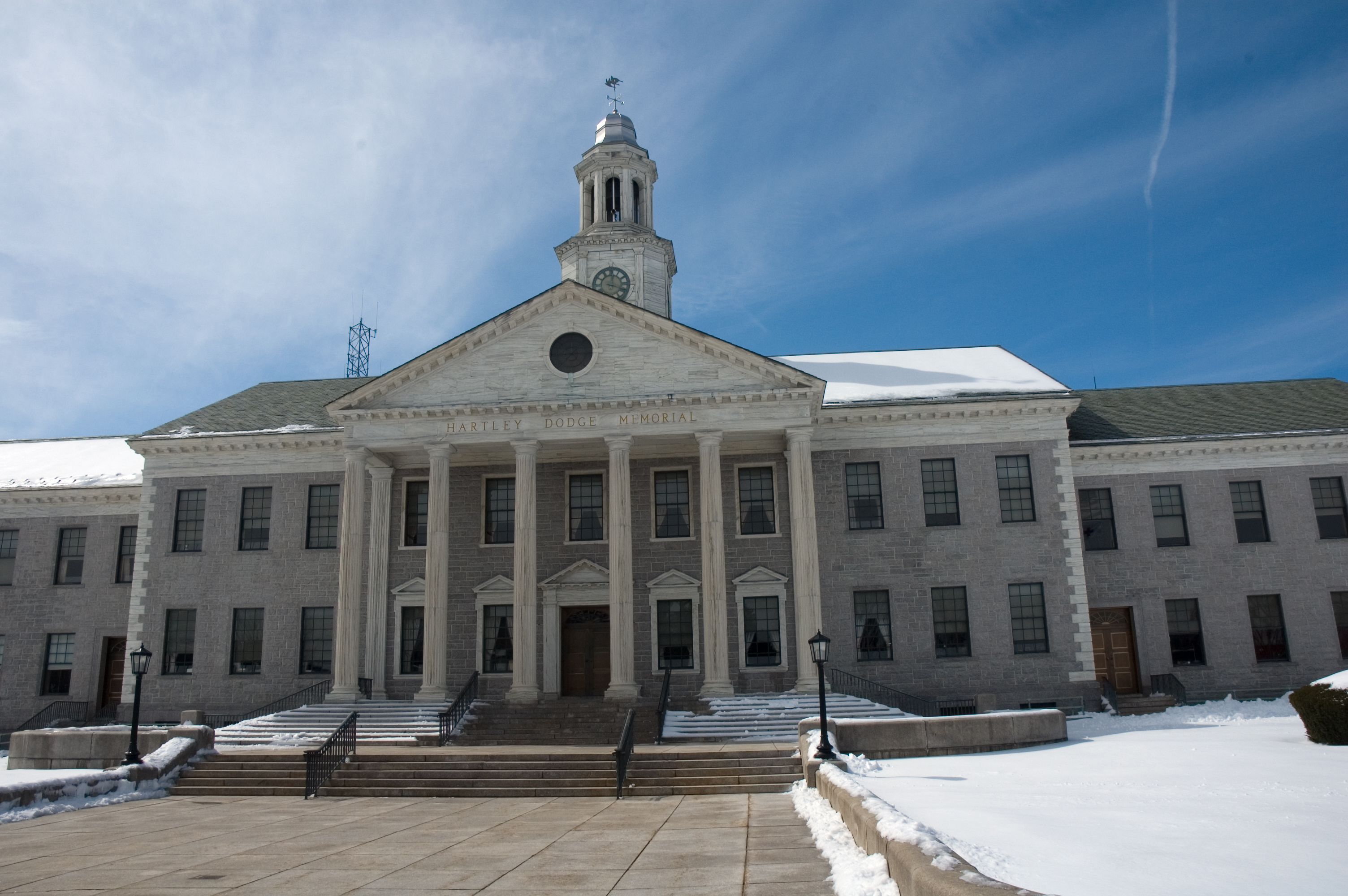
Hartley Dodge Memorial, donated by Geraldine Rockefeller Dodge, houses Madison's local government seat and faces the railroad station.

Madison is governed under the borough form of New Jersey municipal government, which is used in 218 municipalities (of the 564) statewide, making it the most common form of government in New Jersey. The governing body is comprised of the mayor and the borough council, with all positions elected at-large on a partisan basis as part of the November general election. The Mayor of Madison is elected directly by the voters to a four-year term of office. The borough council includes six members elected to serve three-year terms on a staggered basis, with two seats coming up for election each year in a three-year cycle. The borough form of government used by Madison, the most common system used in the state, is a "weak mayor / strong council" government in which council members act as the legislative body with the mayor presiding at meetings and voting only in the event of a tie. The mayor can veto ordinances subject to an override by a two-thirds majority vote of the council. The mayor makes committee and liaison assignments for council members, and most appointments are made by the mayor with the advice and consent of the council.

The Madison Municipal Building is the location since 1935 of a portrait of Abraham Lincoln, attributed to German immigrant artist W.F.K. Travers, painted from life in 1865. The painting, one of three known full-length paintings of Lincoln, is 9-foot (2.7 m) high, and was loaned to the National Portrait Gallery in February 2023 until December 2027.

As of 2026, the mayor of Madison is Democrat Robert H. Conley, whose term of office ends December 31, 2027. Members of the borough council are Council President John Forte (D, 2026), Debra Coen (D, 2028), Thomas Haralampoudis (D, 2028), Melissa Honohan (D, 2027), Robert E. Landrigan (D, 2026) and Eric Range (D, 2027).

==== Mayors of Madison ====
Mayor	Term begins	Term ends
James Preston Albright	January 14, 1890	December 31, 1905
Calvin Anderson	January 1, 1906	December 31, 1907
William F. Redmond	January 1, 1908	December 31, 1909
Calvin Anderson	January 1, 1910	May 6, 1910
George W. Downs	July 25, 1910	December 31, 1913
Benyew D. Philhower	January 1, 1914	December 31, 1915
Otto Ross	January 1, 1916	December 31, 1919
William A. Starrett	January 1, 1920	December 31, 1921
Edward D. Merikle	January 1, 1922	December 31, 1923
John E. Clarey	January 1, 1922	December 31, 1923
Harry A. Crane	May 12, 1924	December 31, 1924
Frank A. Cook	January 1, 1925	December 31, 1927
Frank F. Gibney	January 1, 1928	December 31, 1929
Walter F. Speir	January 1, 1930	December 31, 1931
Frank A. Cook	January 1, 1932	December 31, 1933
Alan H. Brown	January 1, 1934	December 31, 1935
Wilson S. Morris	January 1, 1936	December 31, 1937
Samuel A. Gruver	January 1, 1938	June 29, 1945
Norman J. Griffiths	June 29, 1945	December 31, 1951
Donald A. Morrison	January 1, 1952	December 31, 1953
Alfred P. Smith Jr.	January 1, 1954	December 31, 1955
Thomas T. Taber	January 1, 1956	December 31, 1959
Earl J. Reddert	January 1, 1960	December 31, 1965
William G. Nordling	January 1, 1966	December 31, 1971
Glen O. Head	January 1, 1972	December 31, 1975
Roger B. Vernon	January 1, 1976	December 31, 1979
Elizabeth G. Baumgartner	January 1, 1980	December 31, 1987
Ralph G. Engelsman	January 1, 1988	December 31, 1991
Donald R. Capen	January 1, 1992	December 31, 1995
Gary E. Ruckelshaus	January 1, 1996	December 31, 1999
John J. Dunne	January 1, 2000	December 31, 2003
Ellwood R. Kerkeslager	January 1, 2004	December 31, 2007
Mary-Anna Holden	January 1, 2008	December 31, 2011
Robert H. Conley	January 1, 2012	Incumbent

=== Federal, state, and county representation ===
Madison is located in the 11th Congressional District and is part of New Jersey's 25th state legislative district.

For the 119th United States Congress, New Jersey's 11th congressional district is represented by Analilia Mejia (D, Glen Ridge) who was elected in a 2026 special election to serve for the remainder of the Congress following the resignation Mikie Sherrill (D, Montclair), who was elected Governor of New Jersey in 2025. New Jersey is represented in the United States Senate by Democrats Cory Booker (Newark, term ends 2027) and Andy Kim (Moorestown, term ends 2031).

For the 2026–2027 session, the 25th legislative district of the New Jersey Legislature is represented in the State Senate by Anthony M. Bucco (R, Boonton Township) and in the General Assembly by Aura K. Dunn (R, Mendham Borough) and Marisa Sweeney (D, Morristown).

Morris County is governed by a Board of County Commissioners comprised of seven members who are elected at-large in partisan elections to three-year terms on a staggered basis, with either one or three seats up for election each year as part of the November general election. Actual day-to-day operation of departments is supervised by County Administrator Deena Leary.

As of 2026, Morris County's Commissioners (with all terms ending December 31) are Director Stephen H. Shaw (R, Mountain Lakes, 2027), Deputy Director John Krickus (R, Washington Township, 2027), Douglas Cabana (R, Boonton Township, 2028), Thomas J. Mastrangelo (R, Montville, 2028), Christine Myers (R, Harding Township, 2028), Tayfun Selen (R, Chatham Township, 2026), and Deborah Smith (R, Denville Township, 2027).

The county's constitutional officers are County Clerk Ann F. Grossi (R, Parsippany–Troy Hills, 2028), Sheriff James M. Gannon (R, Boonton Township, 2028) and Surrogate Heather Darling (R, Roxbury, 2029).

=== Politics ===
United States presidential election results for Madison 2024 2020 2016 2012 2008 2004
Year	Republican		Democratic		Third party(ies)	
Year	No.	%	No.	%	No.	%
2024	3,309	37.38%	5,378	60.75%	165	1.86%
2020	3,340	35.81%	5,838	62.60%	148	1.59%
2016	2,980	38.40%	4,421	56.97%	359	4.63%
2012	3,715	50.34%	3,589	48.63%	76	1.03%
2008	3,656	47.06%	4,038	51.98%	75	0.97%
2004	3,881	51.13%	3,648	48.06%	62	0.82%

As of March 2011, there were a total of 9,769 registered voters in Madison, of which 2,577 (26.4%) were registered as Democrats, 3,312 (33.9%) were registered as Republicans and 3,869 (39.6%) were registered as Unaffiliated. There were 11 voters registered as Libertarians or Greens.

Gubernatorial election results for Madison
Year	Republican		Democratic		Third party(ies)	
Year	No.	%	No.	%	No.	%
2025	2,915	38.40%	4,655	61.31%	22	0.29%
2021	2,559	43.55%	3,275	55.74%	42	0.71%
2017	2,159	44.46%	2,620	53.95%	77	1.59%
2013	3,051	65.22%	1,544	33.01%	83	1.77%
2009	2,809	52.69%	1,954	36.65%	568	10.65%
2005	2,435	49.49%	2,377	48.31%	108	2.20%

In the 2024 presidential election, Democrat Kamala Harris received 60.8% of the vote (5,378 cast), ahead of Republican Donald Trump with 37.4% (3,309 votes), and other candidates with 1.9% (165 votes), among the 8,993 ballots cast by the borough's 12,442 registered voters, for a turnout of 72.0% In the 2020 presidential election, Democrat Joe Biden received 62.6% of votes cast (5,838 cast), ahead of Republican Donald Trump with 35.8% (3,340 votes), and other candidates with 1.6% (148 votes), among the 9,503 ballots cast by the borough's 12,284 registered voters, for a turnout of 77.0% In the 2016 presidential election, Democrat Hillary Rodham Clinton received 55.0% of the vote (4,421 cast), ahead of Republican Donald Trump with 37.1% (2,980 votes), and other candidates with 4.5% (359 votes), among the 8,032 ballots cast by the borough's 11,073 registered voters, for a turnout of 73.0%. In the 2012 presidential election, Republican Mitt Romney received 50.3% of the vote (3,715 cast), ahead of Democrat Barack Obama with 48.6% (3,589 votes), and other candidates with 1.0% (76 votes), among the 7,416 ballots cast by the borough's 10,438 registered voters (36 ballots were spoiled), for a turnout of 71.0%.

In the 2013 gubernatorial election, Republican Chris Christie received 65.2% of the vote (3,051 cast), ahead of Democrat Barbara Buono with 33.0% (1,544 votes), and other candidates with 1.8% (83 votes), among the 4,778 ballots cast by the borough's 10,249 registered voters (100 ballots were spoiled), for a turnout of 46.6%.

United States Senate election results for Madison1
Year	Republican		Democratic		Third party(ies)	
Year	No.	%	No.	%	No.	%
2024	3,290	38.79%	5,055	59.60%	137	1.62%
2018	3,203	46.12%	3,553	51.16%	189	2.72%
2012	3,466	50.08%	3,377	48.79%	78	1.13%
2006	2,701	52.26%	2,386	46.17%	81	1.57%

United States Senate election results for Madison2
Year	Republican		Democratic		Third party(ies)	
Year	No.	%	No.	%	No.	%
2020	3,585	39.32%	5,435	59.61%	97	1.06%
2014	1,931	46.72%	2,133	51.61%	69	1.67%
2013	1,605	47.91%	1,728	51.58%	17	0.51%
2008	3,690	51.92%	3,316	46.66%	101	1.42%

== Education ==
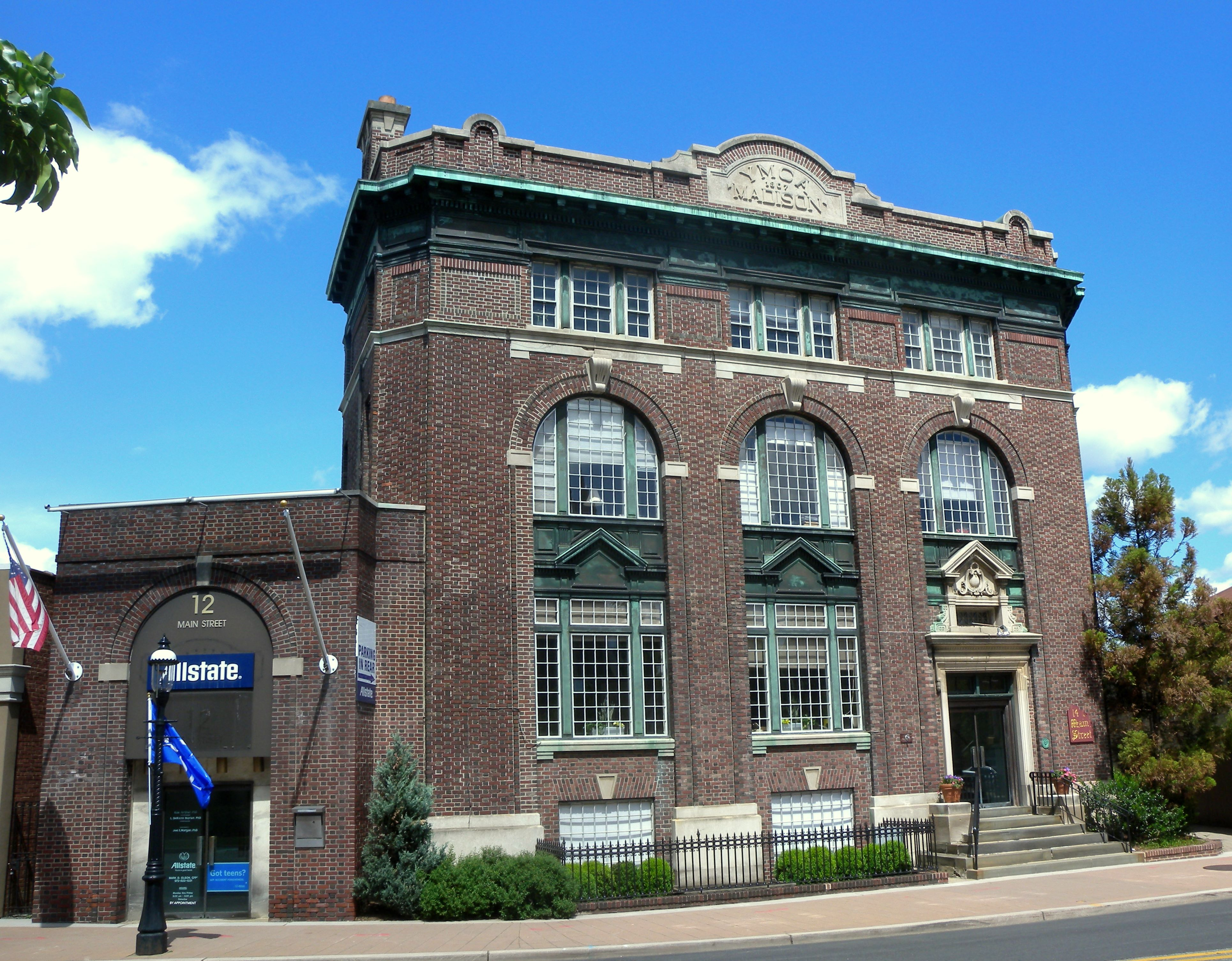
The YMCA building in Madison

=== Public schools ===
The Madison Public Schools serve students in pre-kindergarten through twelfth grade. As of the 2023–24 school year, the district, comprised of five schools, had an enrollment of 2,485 students and 225.0 classroom teachers (on an FTE basis), for a student–teacher ratio of 11.0:1. Schools in the district (with 2023–24 enrollment data from the National Center for Education Statistics) are Central Avenue School with 498 students in grades PreK–5, Kings Road School with 292 students in grades K–5, Torey J. Sabatini School with 292 students in grades K–5, Madison Junior School with 557 students in grades 6–8 and Madison High School with 816 students in grades 9–12. Students from Harding Township attend the district's high school as part of a sending/receiving relationship with the Harding Township School District.

=== Private schools ===
St. Vincent Martyr School (SVMS) is a Catholic parochial school, established in 1848, that serves students in grades Pre-K–3 through eight, operated under the auspices of the Saint Vincent Parish and the Roman Catholic Diocese of Paterson. SVMS is a recipient of the No Child Left Behind National Blue Ribbon School Award of Excellence for 2005–2006. Rainbow Montessori School, founded in 1981, is a Montessori school teaching children in Pre-K and kindergarten.

=== Higher education ===
Seton Hall College (now Seton Hall University) was established in Madison in 1856 and relocated to its location in South Orange, New Jersey, in the late 19th century.

Drew University was founded in 1867 and continues to operate in Madison, on a wooded campus near downtown that was previously a private residence.

Fairleigh Dickinson University's Florham Campus is located in Madison on the former Twombly estate.

Landmark Conference, an NCAA Division III conference, is based in Madison.

Saint Elizabeth University is located just outside Madison, in Convent Station in Morris Township.

== Transportation ==
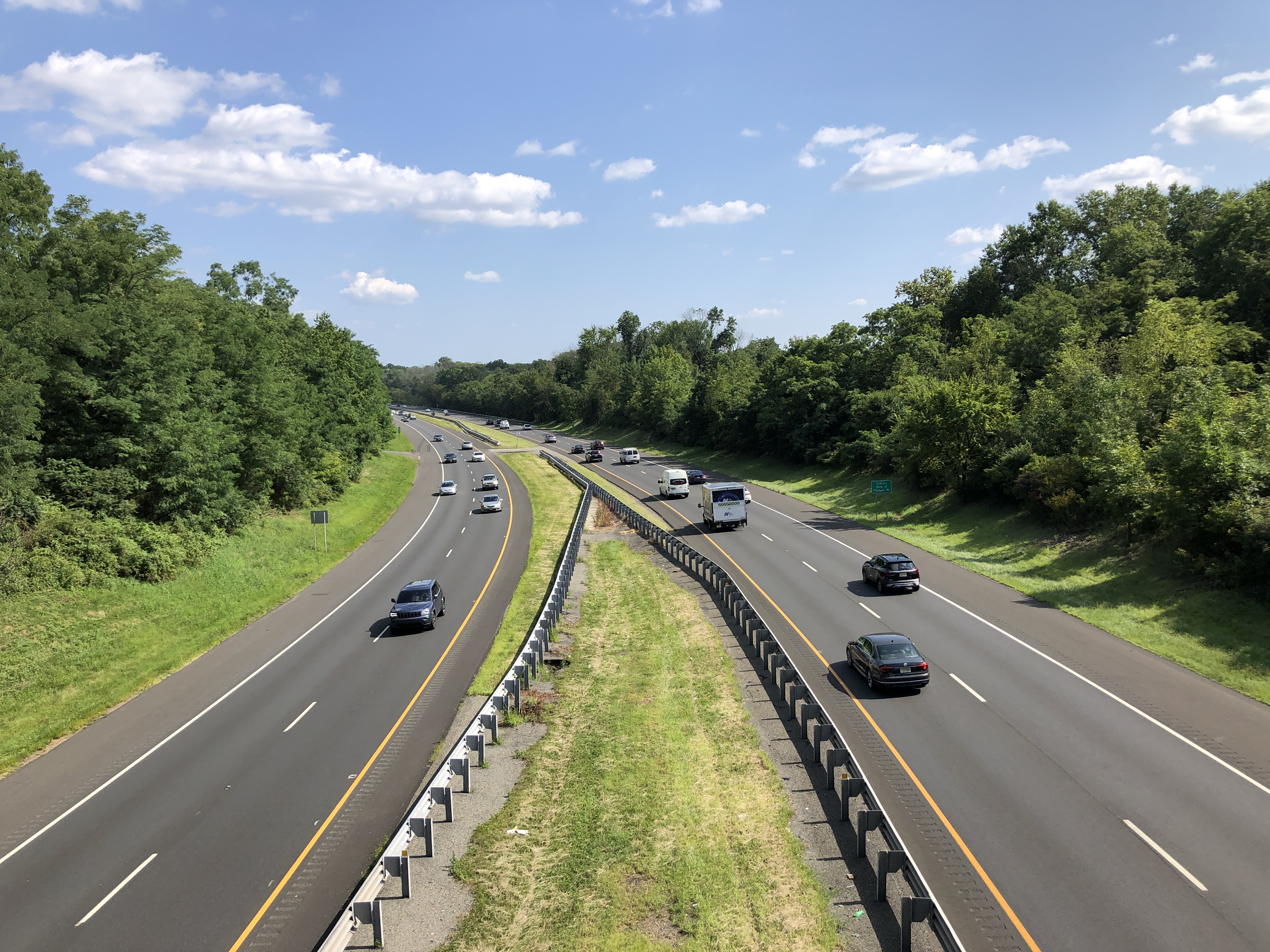
Route 24 eastbound in Madison

=== Roads and highways ===
As of May 2010, the borough had a total of 54.73 miles (88.08 km) of roadways, of which 46.38 miles (74.64 km) were maintained by the municipality, 4.76 miles (7.66 km) by Morris County and 3.59 miles (5.78 km) by the New Jersey Department of Transportation.

The main thoroughfare is Route 124 which connects with Morris Township in the northwest and Chatham Borough to the southeast.

Route 24 is the only limited access road to pass through the borough, doing so briefly for 0.47 miles (0.76 km), but the closest exit is in neighboring Florham Park.

=== Public transportation ===
NJ Transit provides trains service at the Madison station. Commuter service is available on the Morristown Line, with trains heading to Hoboken Terminal, and to Penn Station in Midtown Manhattan via the Kearny Connection.

NJ Transit provides local bus service on the 873 route, replacing service that had been offered on the MCM3 until subsidies to the local providers were eliminated in 2010 as part of budget cuts.

Madison also has a private commuter bus line run by Boxcar Transit that operates five days a week, running directly to and from Midtown Manhattan.

A low-cost campus/downtown shuttle bus operates along Madison Avenue and Main Street during afternoon and evening hours.

== Sister cities ==
Madison has three sister cities:

- Issy-les-Moulineaux, France
- Marigliano, Italy
- Madison, Connecticut, United States

== Points of interest ==
- Drew University
- Fairleigh Dickinson University
- Grace Episcopal Church
- Museum of Early Trades and Crafts
- The Shakespeare Theatre of New Jersey
- Thursday Morning Club

== Film and television ==
- Episodes of the television series, The Sopranos, were filmed in Madison. A scene was filmed on the Drew University campus, while another scene was filmed at Rod's Steak House, just west of the borough limits in Convent Station.
- Portions of A Beautiful Mind were filmed at Fairleigh Dickinson University in Madison.
- The Madison train station played the role of Cranford, New Jersey, in the 2005 film, Guess Who starring Bernie Mac and Ashton Kutcher. The train station, the Hartley-Dodge Memorial building, and the center of Madison serve as backdrops to this movie, and a panorama of the borough is shown during the final credits.
- Hartley Dodge Memorial (Borough Hall) appears in a scene of The World According to Garp starring Glenn Close and Robin Williams.
- Scenes from The Family Stone (2005) were shot downtown at the intersection of Main Street and Waverly Place and Drew University. Despite the fact that the fictional town is supposed to be in New England, one may see a train, clearly marked New Jersey Transit, crossing through Waverly Place in one of the scenes. Additionally, the bus station featured in the movie was shot on Drew University campus in Madison.
- Scenes from Woody Allen's Deconstructing Harry (1997) were filmed on the Drew University campus.
- The original 1968 green Ford Mustang GT driven by Steve McQueen in Bullitt disappeared until it was purchased by Madison resident Robert Kiernan in 1974 from an ad in Road & Track magazine.
- Scenes from the 2025 film The Housemaid were filmed in Madison.

== Notable people ==
People who were born in, residents of, or otherwise closely associated with Madison include:

- Robert Adams (born 1937), photographer who has focused on the changing landscape of the American West
- Lincoln Brower (1931–2018), American entomologist and ecologist, best known for his research on monarch butterflies
- Andy Breckman (born 1955), creator and producer of television series Monk, former Saturday Night Live writer and radio personality
- Jonathan Edward Caldwell (1883–1955), aeronautical engineer whose designs included an ornithopter, which would have flown by flapping its wings
- Robert L. Chapman (1920–2002), thesaurus editor
- Samuel S. Coursen (1926–1950), awarded the Medal of Honor for his actions during the Korean War
- Dick DeBiasse, automotive engineer and machinist (founder of AER Research, also located in Madison), is credited with having contributed to the success of the Lake Underwood team that established Porsche as a winning race car in the United States. He also did the motor work for Mark Donohue in the following decade.
- Geraldine Rockefeller Dodge (1882–1973), philanthropist and noted dog breeder and judge
- Marcellus Hartley Dodge Sr. (1881–1963), chairman of the board of Remington Arms
- Marcellus Hartley Dodge Jr. (1908–1930), heir to the Remington-Rockefeller fortune
- Alexander Duncan (1788–1853), Member of the United States House of Representatives from Ohio
- Jonathan Dwight (1858–1929), ornithologist
- Dean Faiello (born 1959), fake doctor convicted of operating without a license after the 2003 death of a patient
- David Finckel (born 1951), cellist who is co-artistic director of the Chamber Music Society of Lincoln Center
- Edwin Finckel (1917–2001), jazz performer and arranger who was also a composer of songs and classical music
- Janeane Garofalo (born 1964), actor, comedian, author, and activist moved to Madison at age nine, where she remained until she graduated from high school
- Marcel Gleyre (1910–1996), gymnast who competed in the men's vault event at the 1932 Summer Olympics
- Nick Mangold (born 1984), former NFL pro-bowl center with the New York Jets
- Curtis McGraw (1895–1953), publisher and president of McGraw-Hill from 1950 to 1953
- William McGurn (born 1958), former speechwriter for George W. Bush
- Ted Mitchell (1905–1985), American football center who played in the NFL for the Orange/Newark Tornadoes
- Don Newcombe (1926–2019), former Major League Baseball right-handed starting pitcher who played for the Brooklyn/Los Angeles Dodgers, Cincinnati Reds and Cleveland Indians
- Neil O'Donnell (born 1966), former NFL quarterback
- Greg Olear (born 1972), novelist
- Horace W. Palmer (1878–1953), lawyer and politician who served in the New York State Assembly
- Edward Irenaeus Prime-Stevenson (1858–1942), author of Imre: A Memorandum, who wrote under the pseudonym Xavier Mayne
- Aubrey Eugene Robinson Jr. (1923–2000), Chief Federal Judge of the District Court of the District of Columbia, appointed by Lyndon B. Johnson in 1966
- Jay P. Rolison Jr. (1929–2007), lawyer and politician from New York who served in the New York Senate from 1967 to 1990
- David Austin Sayre (1793–1870), silversmith
- David F. Sayre (1822–1919), Wisconsin State Assemblyman, farmer and lawyer
- JoJo Starbuck (born 1951), two-time Olympic competitor in figure skating
- William A. Starrett (1877–1932), builder who constructed the Empire State Building
- Mary Wilkinson Streep (1915–2001), fine artist and art editor
- Charles Henry Totty (1873–1939), horticulturist
- Eddie Trunk (born 1964), heavy metal radio host
- George Witte, poet and author of Deniability: Poems
- Marta Wittkowska (1882–1977), contralto opera singer
