= Saint Vincent Martyr School (Madison, New Jersey) =

Location
- Madison, New Jersey; United States
- 40.757977°N 74.418884°W

Information
- Type: Elementary school
- Religious affiliation: Roman Catholic
- Established: 1848; 178 years ago
- Grades: PK-3 through Eighth Grade
- Enrollment: 400
- Accreditation: Blue Ribbon Schools Program
- Affiliation: Middle States Association of Colleges and Schools
- Website: Saint Vincent Martyr School

Saint Vincent Martyr School (SVMS), the oldest Catholic elementary school (established in 1848) in New Jersey, is the coeducational parish school for Saint Vincent Martyr parish in Madison borough, Morris County, New Jersey, United States. SVMS educates approximately 400 students in grades PK-3 through Eighth Grade. The school is named for Vincent of Saragossa. The school nickname is the Eagles.

The school and parish are in the Southeastern Morris Deanery of the Diocese of Paterson of the Province of Newark of the Latin Church of the Catholic Church.

SVMS was one of three elementary schools in New Jersey, and the only non-public school, recognized by the national Blue Ribbon Schools Program, awarded by the United States Department of Education, for the 2005–06 school year. It is fully accredited by the Middle States Association of Colleges and Schools.

== Sports Program ==
SVMS has many sports teams including basketball, track and field, cross country and offers a scout program.

- Basketball: the basketball season takes place during the winter and includes travel teams from Third Grade to Eighth Grade and an intramural league for those students in grades from Kindergarten to Third Grade.

- Track and Field: track and field is also a new sport which goes on during the spring. The team goes to about five meets a season.

- Volleyball: Volleyball is offered co-ed in the fall, notably winning their CYO league this 2025 season.

- Cross Country: cross country is a fall sport at SVMS that is new to the athletic program.

- Scouting: SVMS offers a Girl Scout and Cub Scout program for all students.
