= Charles Henry Totty =

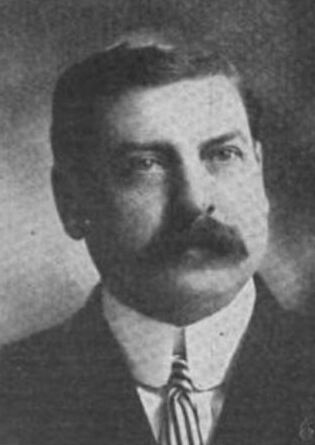
Charles Henry Totty (1873–1939)

Charles Henry Totty (September 7, 1873, Shropshire, England – December 11, 1939, Orange, New Jersey) was a renowned horticulturist who was responsible for establishing the First International Flower Show in New York City. He owned and operated the Charles H. Totty Company of Madison, New Jersey, a nursery known for offering a wide variety of chrysanthemums and roses.

== Biography ==
Totty was born in England in 1873, and came to the United States in 1893, settling in Madison three years later.

The company issued an annual flower and plant catalog called 'Tottys' for many years and ran a successful mail order business as well a store located in New York City at 4 East 53rd Street. The catalog was known for its wide selection of prize winning chrysanthemums such as 'Patricia Grace', 'Mrs. Henry Evans', 'White Cheifton', and 'Amaterasu'. The catalogue featured black-and-white photos as well as color renderings of other hardy perennials including roses and plants for rock gardens.

Totty was awarded a medal by the New York Horticultural Society on October 31, 1913, for his contribution in developing a "New Rose Not in Commerce, Shell Pink Shawyer." He, also, wrote various articles on roses and other plants for several magazines and other publications throughout his career.

He died on December 11, 1939, in Orange, New Jersey, at Memorial Hospital at the age of 66 after an operation.
