= Joel Allegretti =

American poet and fiction writer

- Occupations: American poet and fiction writer
- Notable work: Our Dolphin (Thrice Publishing, 2016), novella

Joel Allegretti is an American poet and fiction writer. His second book of poetry, Father Silicon, was selected by the Kansas City Star as one of 100 Noteworthy Books of 2006. He is the editor of Rabbit Ears: TV Poems (NYQ Books, 2015), the first anthology of poetry about the mass medium.

He has published his work in many U.S. journals and is represented in more than forty anthologies. He is a member of the Academy of American Poets and ASCAP.

== Poetry ==
Allegretti's poems have appeared in The New York Quarterly, Barrow Street, Harpur Palate, Smartish Pace, PANK, and many other national journals, as well as in journals published in Canada, the United Kingdom, Belgium, and India.

In addition to writing six books and chapbooks of poetry, he conceived and edited the anthology Rabbit Ears: TV Poems. The Boston Globe called it "cleverly edited" and "a smart exploration of the many, many meanings of TV." Rain Taxi said, "With its diversity of content and poetic form, Rabbit Ears feels more rich and eclectic than any other poetry anthology on the market."

== Fiction ==
Allegretti has published short stories in The MacGuffin ("A Pair of Wings in Search of a Bird"), The Adroit Journal ("Bird-Boy"), Thrice Fiction ("The Intruders"), and The Nassau Review ("Reassignment Surgery: Patient #A-27"), among other literary magazines.

Our Dolphin, a novella about a deformed Italian adolescent and a talking dolphin, appeared in 2016.

Let's All Be Happy Today, a collection of short fiction, appeared in 2025.

== Performance works ==
His performance texts and short plays have been staged at La MaMa, Medicine Show Theatre, Cornelia Street Cafe, and Sidewalk Cafe, all in New York. He conceived and co-edited "Dear Yoko: A Tribute to Yoko Ono," a special digital issue of Nerve Lantern, a journal of performance texts and writings about performance.

== Musical works ==
Allegretti has published conceptual and experimental musical compositions in Maintenant: A Journal of Contemporary Dada Writing & Art and in anthologies from great weather for MEDIA and Thrice Publishing.

He supplied the texts for three song cycles by the late Frank Ezra Levy, whose recorded work is available in the Naxos American Classics series.

Woman on the Beach, a choral work by Lindsay Greene on his poem of the same title, had its world premiere in the 2024 Festival of Contemporary Artists in Music at Washington State University.

He has co-written songs with blues guitarist Son Lewis, who records for Silk City, a label that specializes in blues, jazz, and folk music.

== Bibliography ==
Poetry Collections

Author

1. Platypus (NYQ Books, 2017)
2. The Body in Equipoise (Full Court Press, 2014), chapbook
3. Europa/Nippon/New York: Poems/Not-Poems (Poets Wear Prada, 2012), chapbook
4. Thrum (Poets Wear Prada, 2010), chapbook
5. Father Silicon (The Poet's Press, 2006), selected by The Kansas City Star as one of 100 Noteworthy Books of 2006
6. The Plague Psalms (The Poet's Press, 2000)

Editor

1. Rabbit Ears: TV Poems (NYQ Books, 2015)

Fiction

1. Let's All Be Happy Today (The Opiate Books, 2025), short fiction
2. Our Dolphin (Thrice Publishing, 2016), novella

Selected Anthologies

1. Greening the Earth: A Global Anthology of Poetry (Penguin Random House India, 2023), "Ghost Fox and Spirit Seal"
2. Extraordinary Visions: Stories Inspired by Jules Verne (North American Jules Verne Society/BearManor Media, 2022), "Gabriel at the Jules Verne Traveling Adventure Show"
3. I Wanna Be Loved by You: Poems on Marilyn Monroe (Milk & Cake Press, 2022), "Amateur Night at Giselle's Attic: Bette Noire Does Marilyn Monroe"
4. Visiting Bob: Poems Inspired by the Life and Work of Bob Dylan (New Rivers Press, 2018), "Epitaph: Edie Sedgwick"
5. Suitcase of Chrysanthemums (great weather for MEDIA, 2018), "The Beloved"
6. Like Light: 25 Years of Poetry & Prose By Bright Hill Poets & Writers (Bright Hill Press, 2017), "What Stéphane Grappelli Means to Me" and "The Definition of 'Museum' Reconsidered as a Portal to Infinity"
7. A Galaxy of Starfish: An Anthology of Modern Surrealism (Salò Press, 2016), "The Body in Equipoise," "Jean Cocteau Spectacles," "The Dark Sea Breaks Heavily - A Reddish Glow Spreads Out in It - A Sea of Blood Foams at My Feet," "The Amphisbaena Reconsidered as Architectural Template," "For Immediate Release: 'House of Goodbye' Opens at Museum of Enteric Representation," and "Towards the Design and Construction of a House in the Shape of Water"
8. Tales of Terror: The Supernatural Poem Since 1800, Volume II (The Poet's Press, 2016), "The Sea Serpent" and "Elegy for Erik, Architect of Hopeless Desire, Angel of Music, Opera House Poltergeist"
9. Meta-Land: Poets of the Palisades II (The Poet's Press, 2016), "Poem for Mary Shelley" and "The Polka-Dot Wings Adventure"
10. My Cruel Invention (Meerkat Press, 2015), "Prepared Piano"
11. SHALE: Extreme Fiction for Extreme Conditions (Texture Press, 2015), "The Intruders"
12. Van Gogh's Ear - Volume 9 (Crossroad Press, 2015), "The Not-Here"
13. The Understanding between Foxes and Light (great weather for MEDIA, 2013), "The La Monte Young Poem"
14. Divining Divas (Lethe Press, 2012), "The Belles of Grey Gardens"
15. Token Entry: New York City Subway Poems (Smalls Books, 2012), "A Concert"
16. Chance of a Ghost: An Anthology of Contemporary Ghost Poems (Helicon Nine Editions, 2005), "Unimpressed with Offenbach, Weary of Rilke, Perplexed by Cocteau, Though Amused by Black Orpheus, Eurydice Reveals Herself to Be the Original Greta Garbo," recipient of an Honorable Mention in the 2006 edition of The Year's Best Fantasy and Horror, published by St. Martin's Griffin

== Poems ==
"The Arranged Marriage" First Literary Review - East

"The Daybook" Boog City

"Disputably 8th Street," "Focus," "6 P.M. on the BQE," and "Satori in Manhattan" Sensitive Skin

"Oh, How We Love You, Second Amendment!" Poets Reading the News

untitled text art Poets Reading the News

"Haiku for Banksy" Live Mag!

"Candy Darling" The Opiate

"As I Walked a Wooded Path on a Saturday in June" The Opiate

"Main Street, 8:40 A.M." First Literary Review - East
