= Thursday Morning Club =

Non-profit organization

Coordinates: 40.76057°N 74.41588°W

Thursday Morning Club, Inc.
- Founded: 1896
- Headquarters: Madison, New Jersey
- Website: www.thursdaymorningclub.org

The Thursday Morning Club, or TMC, is a non-profit, social and philanthropic organization founded in 1896 in Madison, New Jersey and provides childcare services, assistance programs for women, and provides low-cost event venue space for other non-profits in Madison, New Jersey and its surrounding communities. Their stated mission is "...providing programs and projects" promoting "...women’s health, preserving natural resources, promoting literacy and equality, and ... volunteer service".

== History ==
- 1896 – Thursday Morning Club founded
- 1900 – TMC became a member of the New Jersey State Federation of Women's Clubs (NJSFWC)
- 1907 – TMC became a member of the General Federation of Women's Clubs (GFWC)
- 1924 – Settlement House, now known as the Madison Community House, constructed at 25 Cook Avenue
- 1927 – TMC acquires non-profit status
- 1938 – Madison Friends of the Library formed – now independent organization
- 1950 – Rose Wing added to the Settlement House
- 1957 – Settlement House becomes the Madison Community House
- 1960 – Madison Community House Nursery School opened
- 1966 – Rose Wing added and Youth Employment Services offered
- 1967 – Branch of Morris County Legal Aid Society operated from MCH
- 1995 – Association with Morris County Probation Dept. and Project Community Pride
- 1998 – Dress for Success relocated to Madison Community House
- 2000 – Before and After School Child Care Program begins in Madison Public Schools
- 2001 – TMC purchases land at 27 Cook Avenue to build a playground and parking lot
