= Deniability: Poems =

Deniability: Poems is a book written by American poet, George Witte, published in 2009 by Orchises Press.

== Premise ==
Deniability: Poems is a collection of poems that presents internal thought processes from 9/11 through the years of war that followed. It leads the reader on an examination of deniability with what was happening to America and the world. Beginning with a poem entitled, "Uh Oh," about 9/11, Witte explores war's impact on America's democracy and its moral standards.

== Reviews ==
"Poetry is as ancient as language. It ranges from the simple pun to the complex metaphor. And at its best it is nothing less that [sic] music for the mind. Such is the caliber of poetry by George Witte that is now compiled into Deniability. This is Witte's second anthology and is particularly notable for his deft skills in creating memorable verse. 'Just Cause': A line is crossed, unnoticed by command/But photographed in fame's amoral flash./Bodies piled, trophy game atop which rests/One boot; smiles of shy surprise, unabashed.//Another line and wilderness surrounds/Us, humid aisles where everything's displayed/Conscripted to absolve our choices God/Deserts to find a new identity.//We bushwhack through thick scrub, directionless/The way's degraded, markers overgrown/Where filthy water swamps the lowest place/We lost crusaders kneel, and choke it down."—Midwest Poetry Review

"Deniability looks closely at our troubled times, as well as the troubling language and verbal abuse that surfaces in such uncertain moments: clichés and euphemisms, code words and doublespeak.... With loose but careful measures and a keen regard for the exactly right word, Witte examines every opened can of worms before kicking it down the road. Smart, timely, and sane, this volume is highly recommended."—Library Journal, February 1, 2009

"There are times in history when it is best for a people to move on from past mistakes. There are other times, such as now, when the past cries out to be explored. For those who are searching for meaning to the last eight years, a new book by American poet, George Witte, Deniability, is the place to start. This is not only for writing that is spectacular in its simplicity, its perfect placement of each word, its prose, but for its bravery in peeling back the layers of the war on terror as an eight year journey that is stark and unforgiving in its verse."—The Environmentalist

== Author ==
George Witte is the author of four books of poetry: An Abundance of Caution, published by Unbound Edition Press in 2023, Does She Have a Name?, published by NYQ Books in 2014, Deniability: Poems, published by Orchises Press in 2009, and The Apparitioners: Poems, published by Three Rail Press in 2005.

His poems have also been published in The Atlantic, Boulevard, Gettysburg Review, The Kenyon Review, Ploughshares, Prairie Schooner, New York Quarterly, Southwest Review, and Virginia Quarterly Review.

Witte has also worked in book publishing at St. Martin's Press for thirty nine years, as an editor, the publisher of Picador USA, and now as editor in chief. He lives in Ridgewood, New Jersey with his wife and two children.

== Links to Reviews ==
- Midwest Book Review of Deniability
- The Environmentalist review of Deniability
- The Chicago Sun-Times review of Deniability
- The Huffington Post review of Deniability
- Library Journal review of Deniability
