= David Austin Sayre =

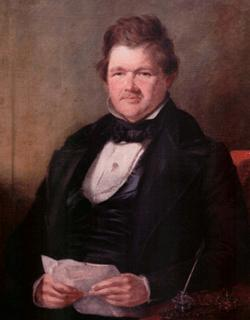
- Born: April 12, 1793; Madison, New Jersey
- Died: September , 1870; Lexington, Kentucky
- Occupations: Silversmith, banker, educator.

David Austin Sayre (March 12, 1793 - September, 1870) was a prominent silversmith, banker and educator. Sayre is best remembered as founder of Sayre Female Institute.

== Early life and education ==
David Austin Sayre was born in Madison, New Jersey on March 12, 1793. Sayre spent his childhood in Madison where he apprenticed to a silversmith. Sayre move to Lexington, Kentucky in 1811 to finish his training.

== Career ==
=== Banking ===
In 1820 Sayre started a banking firm D. A. Sayre and Company because of the large amount of surplus silver deposited in his silversmith safe.

=== Educator ===
Sayre founded Transylvania Female Seminary in 1854 in a building on Mill Street. The school was renamed Sayre Female Institute in 1855 and moved to Limestone Street.

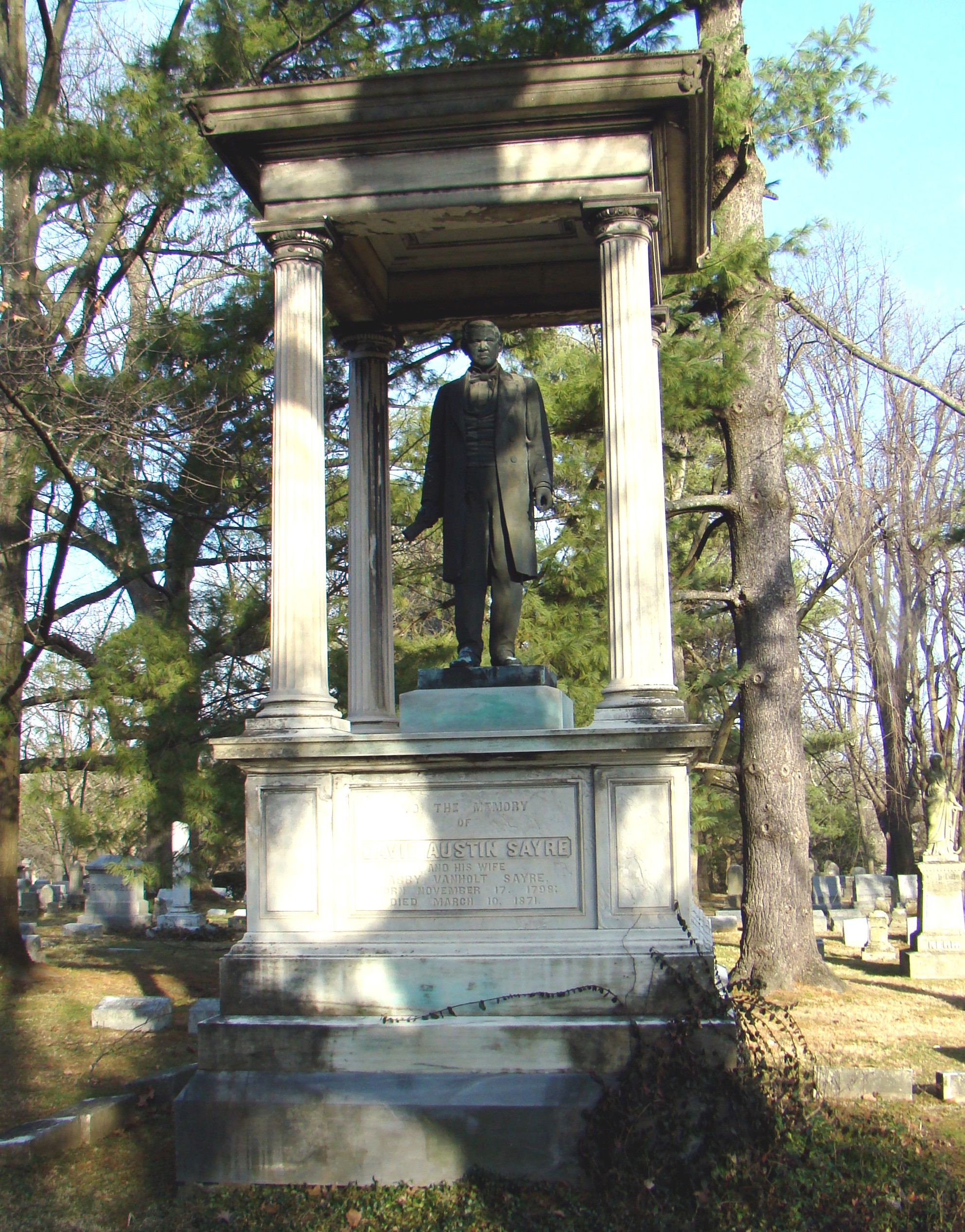
Grave

== Later life and death ==
Sayre is buried in Lexington Cemetery with his wife Abby Vanholt Sayre.
