= Shakespeare Theatre of New Jersey =

American theatre company

Coordinates: 40.76163°N 74.42650°W

The Shakespeare Theatre of New Jersey
- Interactive map of The Shakespeare Theatre of New Jersey
- Address: 36 Madison Avenue; Madison, New Jersey; United States
- Capacity: 308
- Type: Regional theatre

Construction
- Opened: 1963

Website
- www.shakespearenj.org

The Shakespeare Theatre of New Jersey is New Jersey's only professional troupe specializing in Shakespeare. Located in Madison, New Jersey, as of 2013 it is the state's largest theatre company dedicated to the works of Shakespeare and other classics, including rarely-produced epics.

In 2002 the Geraldine R. Dodge Foundation awarded the theatre a $1 million strategic partnership grant "in recognition of the artistry, achievements and leadership of this acclaimed Madison, New Jersey–based performing arts and education organization."

The company's annual main stage season runs from May to December, presented at the F.M. Kirby Shakespeare Theatre on the campus of Drew University in Madison.

It is a member company of the New Jersey Theatre Alliance.

== History ==
The Shakespeare Theatre of New Jersey was founded in 1963 by Paul Barry as the New Jersey Shakespeare Festival, part of a summer-stock season at the Cape May Playhouse in the resort town of Cape May, New Jersey. The festival was relocated in 1972 to a permanent home on the campus of Drew University.
