= Rabbit Ears: TV Poems =

Anthology of English poems about television

First edition

Rabbit Ears: TV Poems is an anthology from NYQ Books, edited by Joel Allegretti. Released in 2015, it consists of poems about television and is reportedly the first poetry anthology to cover the subject. It contains 129 poems by 130 poets, including former U.S. Poet Laureate Billy Collins, who suggested the title.

The Boston Globe called Rabbit Ears "cleverly edited" and "a smart exploration of the many, many meanings of TV." Rain Taxi said, "With its diversity of content and poetic form, Rabbit Ears feels more rich and eclectic than any other poetry anthology on the market." The Pittsburgh Post-Gazette included Rabbit Ears in its 2015 holiday gift guide for TV fans, along with books about Breaking Bad and Downton Abbey.

In an interview with The Huffington Post, Allegretti said, "Poets by and large today are educators and scholars. I’m neither. My background is in media relations. My last job was director of media relations for a national not-for-profit organization. I prepared the CEO, his senior executives, and other spokespeople for interviews. I dealt with Nightly Business Report, 60 Minutes, and producers at local TV stations around the country. I’ve been inside TV studios. Had I not had that experience, I probably wouldn’t have conceived an anthology of TV poetry."

Rabbit Ears is in the Fales Collection at New York University and in the archives of the University of Rochester, SUNY Buffalo, the University of Wisconsin, and the Ohio State University.

Contributors:

Austin Alexis

Joel Allegretti

Aaron Anstett

Quan Barry

Ellen Bass

Jeanne Marie Beaumont

Martine Bellen

Aaron Belz

Emma Bolden

Charlie Bondhus

Gayle Brandeis

Michael Broder

Kurt Brown

John F. Buckley and Martin Ott

Regie Cabico

Peter Carlaftes

Susana H. Case

Guillermo Filice Castro

Ann Cefola

Suzanne Cleary

Billy Collins

Jeffery Conway

Nina Corwin

Steve Dalachinsky

MaryLisa DeDomenicis

Cat Dixon

celeste doaks

Thom Donovan

Maggie Dubris

Alan Feldman

Monique Ferrell

Edward Field

Annie Finch

Stanford M. Forrester

John Foy

Philip Fried

Jeannine Hall Gailey

Amy Gerstler

George Guida

Marj Hahne

Raymond P. Hammond

Penny Harter

George Held

Matthew Hittinger

Tony Hoagland

Janis Butler Holm

Amy Holman

Bob Holman

Josh Humphrey

Karla Huston

Colette Inez

Luisa Aguilar Igloria

Ice Gayle Johnson

W. Todd Kaneko

Vasiliki Katsarou

Collin Kelley

Ron Kolm

Dean Kostos

Catherine B. Krause

Peter LaBerge

Gerry LaFemina

Erik La Prade

Dorianne Laux

David Lawton

Lynn Levin

Matthew Lippman

Timothy Liu

Chip Livingston

Diane Lockward

Roy Lucianna

Marjorie Maddox

Gerard Malanga

Robert Manaster

Stephen Massimilla

Chris McCreary

Lynn McGee

Kelly McQuain

David Messineo

Philip Miller

Michael Montlack

Tracie Morris

Rick Mullin

Peter E. Murphy

Joey Nicoletti

Jacob Oet

Abiodun Oyewole

Michael Palma

Matthew Pennock

David Phillips

Patricia Polak

Stephen Roger Powers

Stella Vinitchi Radulescu

Bethany Reid

Steven Riel

Susanna Rich

Aram Saroyan

Jason Schneiderman

Steven D. Schroeder

Elaine Sexton

Ravi Shankar

Neil Shepard

Hilary Sideris

Hal Sirowitz

Ellen McGrath Smith

Rosalind Palermo Stevenson

Terese Svoboda

Aldo Tambellini

Tantra-zawadi

Mervyn Taylor

Maria Terrone

John J. Trause

Tony Trigilio

David Trinidad

Ryan G. Van Cleave

Gloria Vando

Angelo Verga

David Vincenti

Diane Wakoski

George Wallace

Lewis Warsh

Estha Weiner

Lauren Wells

Marcus Wicker

George Witte

Debbie Yee

David Yezzi

Michael T. Young

Grace Zabriskie

Bill Zavatsky
