= George Witte =

American poet and book editor

- Born: Madison, New Jersey, U.S.
- Education: Duke University; University of North Carolina at Chapel Hill
- Occupations: Poet, book editor
- Employer: St. Martin's Press
- Known for: Deniability: Poems
- Movement: Poetry

George Merrill Witte is an American poet and book editor from Madison, New Jersey. He is editor-in-chief of St. Martin's Press, and the author of An Abundance of Caution, Does She Have a Name?, Deniability: Poems and The Apparitioners: Poems.

== Career ==
Witte is the author of four books of poetry: An Abundance of Caution, Does She Have a Name?, Deniability, and The Apparitioners. His poems have been published in The Atlantic, The Antioch Review, Boulevard, Gettysburg Review, The Hopkins Review, The Kenyon Review, Ploughshares, Poetry, Prairie Schooner, New York Quarterly, Southwest Review, Virginia Quarterly Review, and The Yale Review.

Witte has also worked in book publishing at St. Martin's Press for 38 years, as an editor, publisher of Picador USA, and now editor-in-chief. A graduate of Duke University and the University of North Carolina at Chapel Hill, he lives in Ridgewood, New Jersey.

== Awards ==
Witte received Poetry's Frederick Bock Prize for a group of poems, a poetry fellowship from the New Jersey Council on the Arts and New Jersey Department of State, and his poem "At Dusk, the Catbird" was selected for The Best American Poetry 2007 anthology.

== Works ==
- An Abundance of Caution, Unbound Edition Press, 2023
- Does She Have a Name? NYQ Books, 2014
- Deniability: Poems. Orchises Press. 2009. ISBN 978-1-932535-19-8.
- The Apparitioners: Poems. Three Rail Press. 2005. ISBN 978-0-9760470-1-8.

=== Anthologies ===
- The Best American Poetry 2007
- Vocabula Bound 2
- Old Flame: From the First 10 Years of 32 Poems
- Rabbit Ears: TV Poems, ed. Joel Allegretti (NYQ Books, 2015)
- The Doll Collection, ed. Diane Lockward (Terrapin Books, 2016)
- Meta-Land: Poets of the Palisades II, ed. Paul Nash and Denise La Neve (The Poet's Press, 2016)
- What Editors Do: The Art, Craft, and Business of Book Editing, ed. Peter Ginna (University of Chicago Press, 2017)
- What the House Knows, ed. Diane Lockward (Terrapin Books, 2025)
