= St. Martin's Press =

American book publisher

- Parent company: Macmillan Publishers
- Founded: 1952; 74 years ago
- Country of origin: United States
- Headquarters location: Equitable Building; 120 Broadway; New York City, New York 10271, U.S.
- Distribution: Macmillan (US); Melia Publishing Services (UK)
- Key people: George Witte; Sally Richardson; Jennifer Enderlin; Andrew Martin; Laura Clark
- Imprints: Castle Point Books, Griffin, Minotaur, St. Martin's Press, St. Martin's Essentials, Wednesday Books
- Owner: Verlagsgruppe Georg von Holtzbrinck
- Official website: stmartinspress.com

St. Martin's Press is a book publisher headquartered in Manhattan in New York City. It is headquartered in the Equitable Building. St. Martin's Press is considered one of the largest English-language publishers, bringing to the public some 700 titles a year under six imprints.

The imprints include St. Martin's Press (mainstream and bestseller books), St. Martin's Griffin (mainstream paperback books, including fiction and nonfiction), Minotaur (mystery, suspense, and thrillers), Castle Point Books (specialty nonfiction), St. Martin's Essentials (lifestyle), and Wednesday Books (young adult fiction).

== History ==
After selling its stake in Macmillan US in 1951, Macmillan Publishers of the UK founded St. Martin's in 1952 and named it after St Martin's Lane in London, where Macmillan Publishers was headquartered. In 1987, St. Martin's acquired Tor-Forge Books (science fiction, fantasy, and thrillers). In 1995, Macmillan was sold to Holtzbrinck Publishers, LLC, a group of publishing companies held by Verlagsgruppe Georg von Holtzbrinck, a family owned publishing concern based in Stuttgart, Germany, which also owns publishing houses including Farrar, Straus and Giroux (of mostly literary fiction) and Holt Publishers (literary non-fiction).

Authors published by St. Martin's include Mary Kay Andrews, Casey McQuiston, Bill O'Reilly, C. J. Box, Linda Castillo, Ann Cleeves, Kristin Hannah, Lynda Lopez, Ben Coes, Louise Penny, Nora Roberts, Rainbow Rowell, Ian K. Smith, Sally Hepworth, N. Leigh Dunlap, and Jocko Willink. It also publishes the New York Times crossword puzzle books. Its textbook division, Bedford-St. Martin's, was founded in 1981. In 1984, St. Martin's became the first major trade-book publisher to release its hardcover books by its in-house mass-market paperback company, St. Martin's Mass Market Paperback Co., Inc.

In October 2023, a St. Martin's Press employee's posts regarding the Gaza war drew the attention of the online book community. A Palestinian member of BookTok posted a video demonstrating screenshots of the employee's anti-Palestine remarks. She also observed that despite being on the influencer list managed by St. Martin's Press, her requests for titles were regularly denied or ignored, while white creators seemed to have no issue receiving requested books, an experience that was shared by many of her fellow Arab and Muslim creators. In response, the community group Readers for Accountability formed to encourage a marketing and promotional boycott modeled on the HarperCollins union strike. The campaign's petition, which calls for St. Martin's Press to address the employee's statements, as well as how they would support Arab and Palestinian creators moving forward, received more than 8,000 signatures by January 2024, and nearly 10,000 by August 2024.

In August 2024, concerns on influencer privacy were discussed when a PR box sent to influencers from St. Martin's Press included a sex toy, which influencers were not aware would be included. Many related this back to Readers for Accountability's concerns of influencer privacy and safety.

St. Martin's Press's editor in chief is George Witte. Jennifer Enderlin was named publisher in 2016. Sally Richardson was appointed chairman in 2018.

== Imprints ==
- St. Martin's Press, mainstream and bestseller books.
- St. Martin's Griffin, mainstream trade paperback books, including romance.
- Minotaur, mystery, suspense, and thrillers. Winners of the St. Martin's Press "Malice Domestic" First Traditional Mystery Contest receive a $10,000 one-book Minotaur publishing contract.
- Castle Point Books, specialty nonfiction.
- St. Martin's Essentials, lifestyle.
- Wednesday Books, young adult fiction.
