= Chatham Borough, New Jersey =

Borough in Morris County, New Jersey, US

- Borough
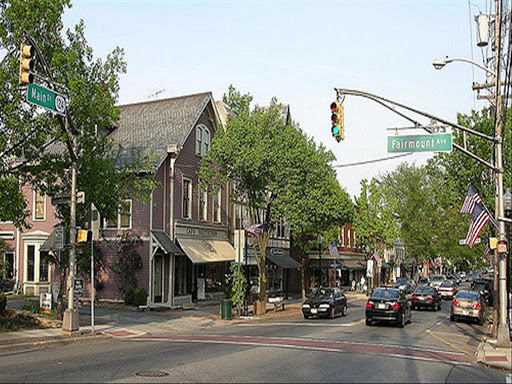
- Main Street in Downtown Chatham

- Coat of arms

- Location of Chatham (borough) in Morris County highlighted in red (right). Inset map: Location of Morris County in New Jersey highlighted in orange (left).

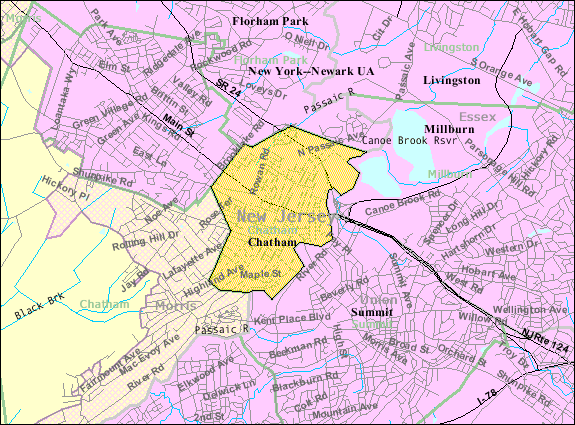
- Census Bureau map of Chatham (borough), New Jersey

- Location in Morris County Location in New Jersey Location in the United States
- Coordinates: 40.740686°N 74.38448°W
- Country: United States
- State: New Jersey
- County: Morris
- European settlement: 1710 (as a colonial village)
- Incorporated: August 19, 1892 (as village)
- Reincorporated: March 1, 1897 (as borough)
- Named after: William Pitt, 1st Earl of Chatham

Government
  - Type: Borough
  - Body: Borough Council
  - Mayor: Carolyn Dempsey (D, term ends December 31, 2027)
  - Administrator: Steven W. Williams
  - Municipal clerk: Vanessa Nienhouse

Area
  - Total: 2.38 sq mi (6.16 km^{2})
  - Land: 2.34 sq mi (6.07 km^{2})
  - Water: 0.035 sq mi (0.09 km^{2}) 1.51%
  - Rank: 382nd of 565 in state 32nd of 39 in county
- Elevation: 233 ft (71 m)

Population (2020)
  - Total: 9,212
  - Estimate (2024): 10,062
  - Rank: 257th of 565 in state 21st of 39 in county
  - Density: 3,925/sq mi (1,515/km^{2})
  - Rank: 167th of 565 in state 7th of 39 in county
- Time zone: UTC−05:00 (Eastern (EST))
  - Summer (DST): UTC−04:00 (Eastern (EDT))
- ZIP Code: 07928
- Area code: 973
- FIPS code: 34-12100
- GNIS feature ID: 0885182
- Website: www.chathamborough.org

Chatham Borough is a suburban borough in Morris County, in the U.S. state of New Jersey. As of the 2020 United States census, the borough's population was 9,212, an increase of 250 (+2.8%) from the 2010 census count of 8,962, which in turn reflected an increase of 502 (+5.9%) from the 8,460 counted in the 2000 census.

The area that is now Chatham and surrounding Morris County has been inhabited by the Lenape people for thousands of years before Europeans first arrived. During historic times, Europeans began trading with the Native Americans who farmed, fished, and hunted in the area when it was claimed as part of New Netherlands. The community that now is Chatham was first settled by Europeans in 1710 within Morris Township, in what was then the English Province of New Jersey. The community was settled because the site already was on the path of a well-worn Native American trail, the location of an important crossing of the Passaic River, and being close to a gap in the Watchung Mountains. The residents of the English community changed its name from John Day's Bridge to Chatham, New Jersey in 1773.

Chatham's residents were active participants in the American Revolutionary War, which ended in 1783. Chatham Township was formed as a local government in the new state of New Jersey on February 12, 1806, taking its name from this pre-revolutionary village. Initial local government forms were limited while the new state government evolved. The new township governed the village of Chatham that lay within the present-day borough boundaries, along with several other pre-revolutionary, colonial villages and large areas of unsettled lands connecting or adjacent to them. On August 19, 1892, Chatham adopted a new village form of government when it became allowed within townships in the state after the revolution. Shortly thereafter, once it was allowed, the village of Chatham reincorporated for governance as a borough by an act of the New Jersey Legislature on March 1, 1897, returning to complete independence from the surrounding Chatham Township.

An early railroad located along the Morris and Essex Lines that had become well established by the start of the Civil War as one of America's first commuter railroads, had a stop at Chatham, which attracted many from nearby Manhattan, 20 miles to the east. It remains a commuter town for residents who work in New York City. Today, Chatham is a pedestrian-friendly community that covers less than 2.5 square miles (6.5 km^{2}), including a central business district and railroad station within approximately 1 mile (1.6 km) from its farthest boundary. The borough is situated in southeastern Morris County bordering both Essex and Union counties along the Passaic River. Northeast of the borough is the upscale Mall at Short Hills located in the Short Hills section of Millburn.

In July 2005, CNN/Money and Money magazine ranked Chatham ninth on its annual list of the 100 Best Places to Live in the United States. New Jersey Monthly magazine ranked Chatham as its 25th best place to live in its 2008 rankings of the "Best Places To Live" in New Jersey. In 2012, Forbes.com listed Chatham as 375th in its listing of "America's Most Expensive ZIP Codes", with a median home price of $776,703.

The borough has been ranked as one of the state's highest-income communities. In March 2018, Bloomberg ranked Chatham as the 64th highest-income place in the United States and as having the 8th-highest income in New Jersey. In the 2013–2017 American Community Survey (ACS) the borough had a median household income of $163,026, ranking 16th in the state. The 2014–2018 ACS showed a median household income of $169,524 in the borough versus $111,316 in the county and $79,363 statewide. The most-recent (2021) ACS places the median household income of Chatham Borough at $209,283.

== History ==
=== Indian habitation ===
Occupied for thousands of years by Native Americans, this land was overseen by clans of the Minsi and Lenni Lenape, who farmed, fished, and hunted upon it. They were organized into a matrilineal, agricultural, and mobile hunting society sustained with fixed, but not permanent, settlements in their clan territories. Villages were established and relocated as the clans farmed new sections of the land when soil fertility lessened and moved among their fishing and hunting grounds.

=== Early European settlement ===
In 1498, John Cabot explored this portion of the New World. The area was claimed as a part of the Dutch New Netherland province, where active trading in furs took advantage of the natural pass west, but, the Lenape prevented permanent settlement beyond what is now Jersey City. Although rapid exhaustion of the local beaver population soon turned the Dutch interests much farther north, contention existed between the Dutch and the British over the rights to this land and battles ensued. Passing to the rule of the British as the Province of New Jersey upon the fall of New Amsterdam in 1664, and becoming one of its original thirteen colonies, marks the beginning of permanent European settlements on this land.

The land that would become Chatham was part of the Province of East Jersey; the Indian rights to Chatham were purchased in 1680 from members of the Minsi and Lenni Lenape tribes. They spoke an Algonquian language. They hunted and fished in the area and farmed on the lands of their settlements. The area was well connected with established paths among their settlements, to and from bountiful resources, and to neighboring settlements. Safe passageways through the valleys, marshes, swamps, and mountains of this portion of the Watchung Mountains connected the area that would become Chatham with other settlements in the area. Except for highways built since the 1970s and a shunpike built to avoid tolls on the roads connecting the colonial settlements of Chatham and Bottle Hill, the roads of the area follow those time proven, long trodden trails made by the native tribes. Main Street rises from a shallow crossing of the Passaic River and, after traveling through what became the settlements of Chatham and Bottle Hill (which became Madison), the road follows a westward path that leads to the top of the plateau on which Morristown was founded.

In 1680, the British first purchased this Lenape land upon which John Day made the first European settlement in 1710. He chose to settle upon the western bank of the Fishawack Crossing (of the Passaic River) on the traditional Lenape Minisink Trail. Chatham was in the area delineated as Morris Township by the English. The landing at that location was the best place to ford the river and always had been used by the Lenape on their route to the Hudson River and south from their hunting grounds in what is now Sussex County. That traditional part of the Great Trail would become today’s Route 124, leading to Madison, Morristown, Mendham, and Chester. It became known as Main Street in Chatham.

=== Establishment ===
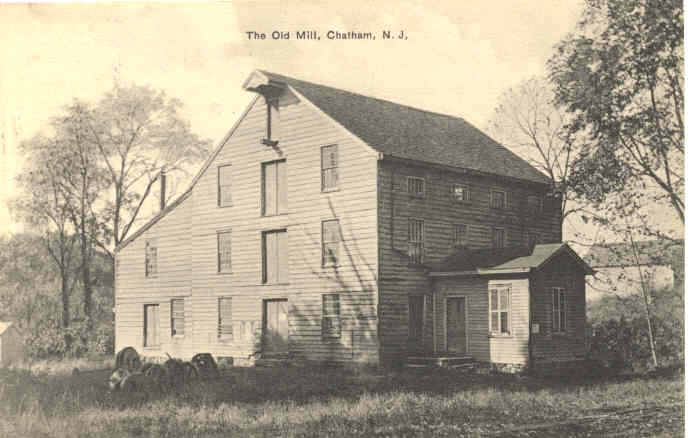
The Old Mill at Chatham, N. J. depicted on a 1911 postcard

Before long, the village became known as John Day's Bridge because of a bridge he built across the river at the shallow landing. By 1750, the village had a blacksmith shop as well as a flour mill, a grist mill, and a lumber mill.

In 1773, the village was renamed to "Chatham" to honor a member of the British Parliament, William Pitt, the first Earl of Chatham, who was an outspoken advocate of the rights of the colonists in America.

New Jersey was one of the Thirteen Colonies that revolted against British rule in the American Revolutionary War. The New Jersey Constitution of 1776 was passed on July 2, 1776, two days before the Second Continental Congress declared American Independence from Great Britain. It was an act of the New Jersey Provincial Congress, which made itself into the state legislature. To reassure neutrals, it provided that it would become void if the state of New Jersey reached reconciliation with Great Britain.

The citizens of Chatham were active participants in the Revolutionary War and nearby Morristown became the military center of the revolution. George Washington twice established his winter headquarters in Morristown and revolutionary troops were active regularly in the entire area. The Lenape assisted the colonists, supplying the revolutionary army with warriors and scouts in exchange for food supplies and the promise of a role at the head of a future Native American state. The Treaty of Easton signed by the Lenape and the British in 1766 had required that the Lenape move to Pennsylvania. Wanting to recoup rights lost thereby to the British, the Lenape were the first tribe to enter into a treaty with the emerging government of the United States. In 1781, General Rochambeau built a large bakery operation at Chatham as a subterfuge that could be interpreted as his plan to stay in Chatham for an extended amount of time, in order to distract from the fact that his troops were marching south toward Yorktown.

The Watchung mountain range was a strategic asset in the war, acting as a natural barrier to the British troops and providing a vantage point for Washington to monitor their troop movements. The Minisink Trail and the village bridge provided a route for essential supplies across the river and through the mountain range. The Hobart Gap was vital as the only pass through the Watchung Mountains.

Washington wrote 17 letters while he stayed at a homestead in Chatham. The community was the site of several skirmishes, as residents and the rebel army held off British advances, preventing them from attacking Washington's supplies at Morristown.

In 1779, a printing press was established in the village of Chatham by Shepard Kollock. From his workshop, he published books, pamphlets, and the New Jersey Journal (the third newspaper published in New Jersey) conducting lively debates about the efforts for independence and boosting the morale of the troops and their families with information derived directly from Washington's headquarters in nearby Morristown. Kollock's newspaper was published until 1992 as the Elizabeth Daily Journal (having relocated to there in 1787) and was the fourth oldest newspaper published continuously in the United States.

=== Partition of the Chathams ===
After the Revolutionary War was over in 1783, establishment of new forms of government began. On February 12, 1806, the village of Chatham became part of Chatham Township with a township form of government that shared the village's name and included several other area communities and a large amount of unsettled land. However, "[i]n 1892 Chatham Village found itself at odds with the rest of the township. Although village residents paid 40 percent of the township taxes, they got only 7 percent of the receipts in services. The village had to raise its own money to install kerosene street lamps and its roads were in poor repair. As a result, the village voted on August 9, 1892, to secede from governance by the township."

Ten days later, on August 19, 1892, the citizens of Chatham reincorporated with another type of village government then offered as an alternative within townships by the new state. The evolving state regulations regarding governance structure soon began to offer a borough form for governance. Chatham adopted that new government form and the village reincorporated for governance as a borough by an act of the New Jersey Legislature on March 1, 1897, with complete independence from Chatham Township.

Most of the colonial settlements that had been part of Chatham Township abandoned its governance as soon as new forms of government became available to them during this evolution of new state regulations. Green Village being the exception, each of the settlements withdrew from governance by the township and Chatham Township was left to govern mostly unsettled lands.

In 1910, the borough boundaries expanded when Chatham acquired a slice of Florham Park. The local form of government and the boundaries of the borough have remained the same since that acquisition, encompassing about 2.4 square miles (6.2 km^{2}).

=== Chathams merger talks ===
In 2009, in the wake of the great recession, Chatham Borough seriously considered merging with Chatham Township to save costs on services such as garbage collection, police, and fire-fighting, with the Chatham Township Committee being in favor of a merger, while the mayor of Chatham Borough was opposed. In 2011 the issue would heat up again as Princeton Township and Princeton Borough merged with members of the Chatham Township Committee stating the merger had set a precedent and a timetable for the Chathams to merge.

== Architecture ==
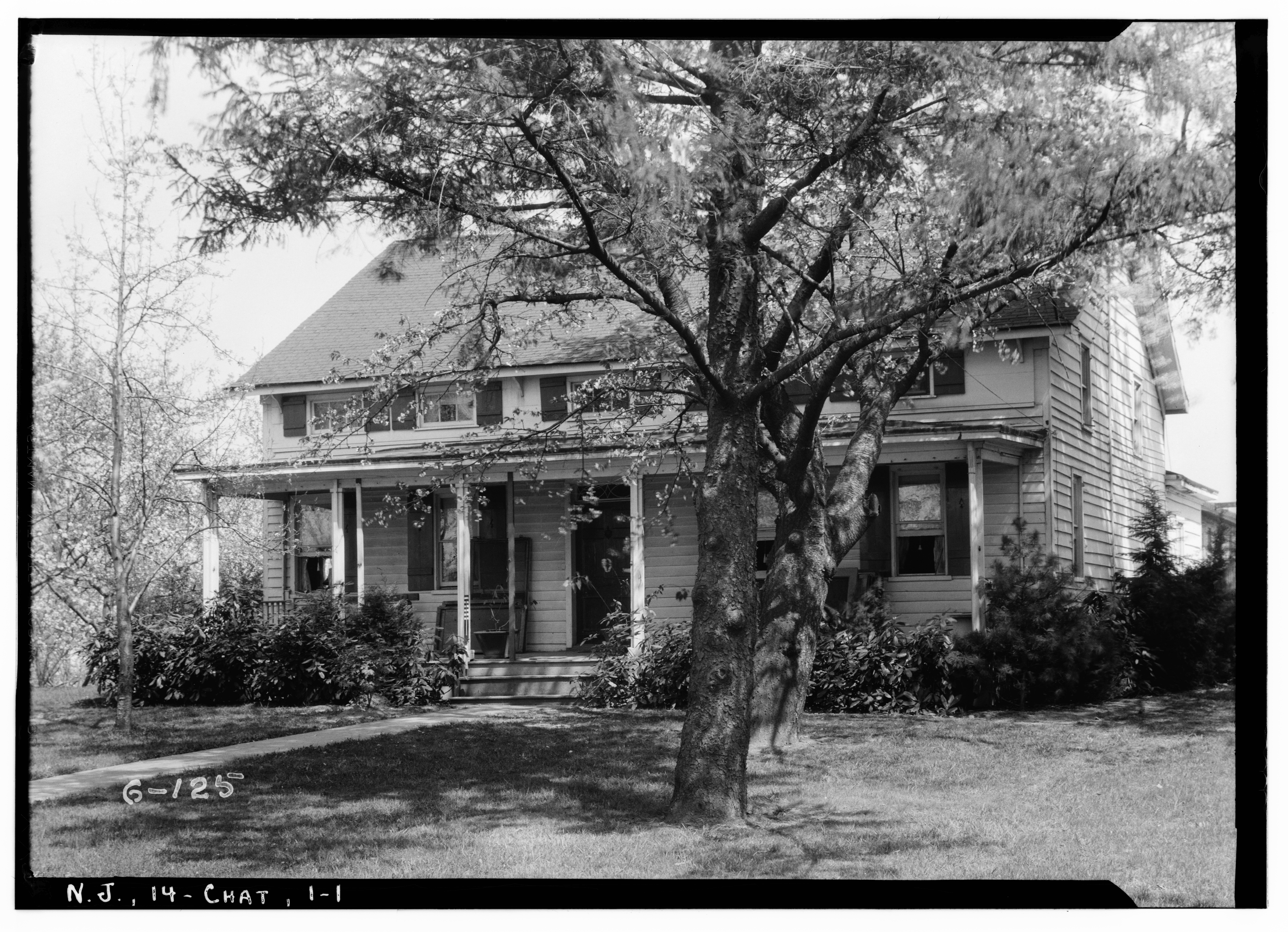
Historic Stephen Day House c. 1936

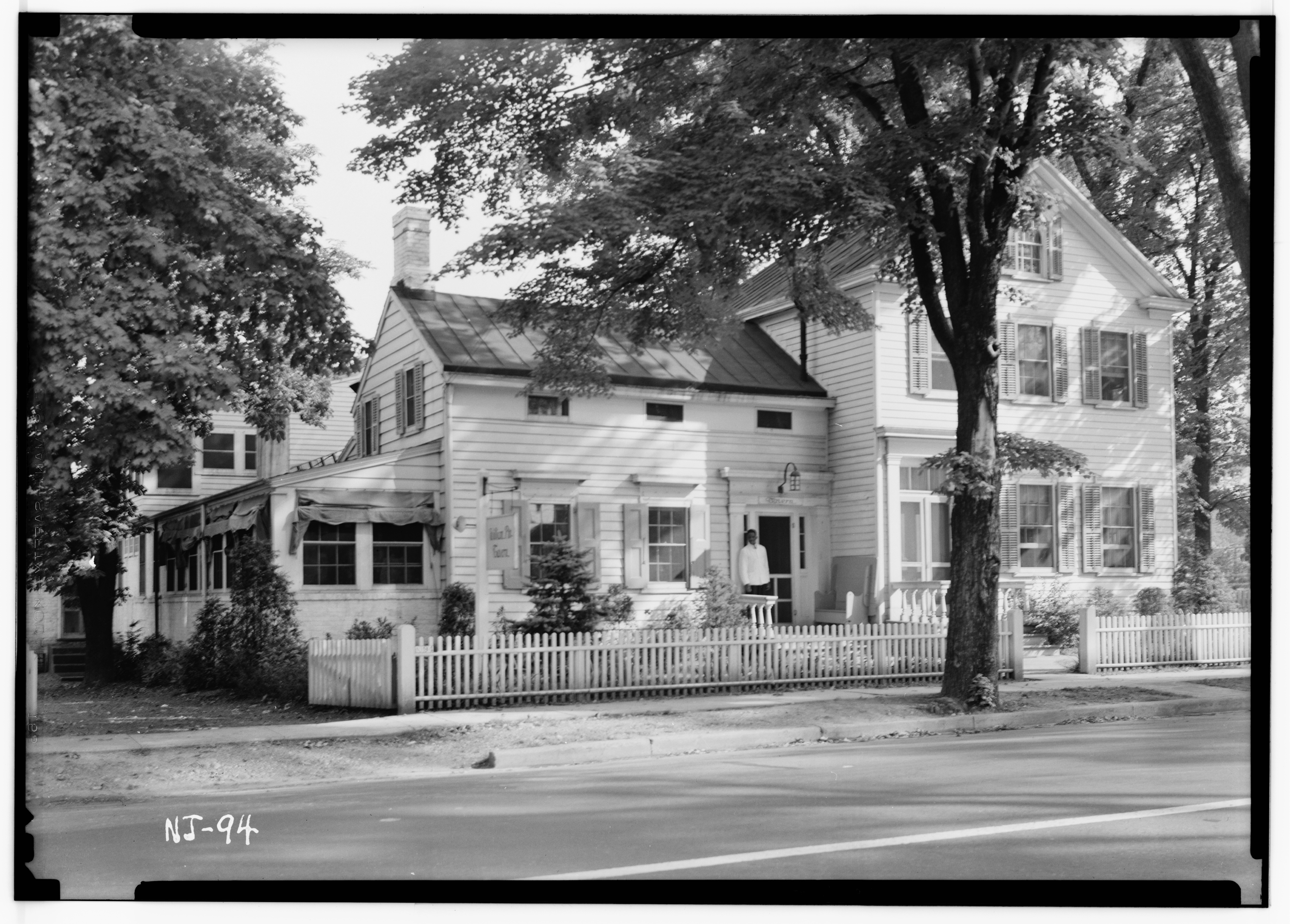
Historic Crane House c. 1937

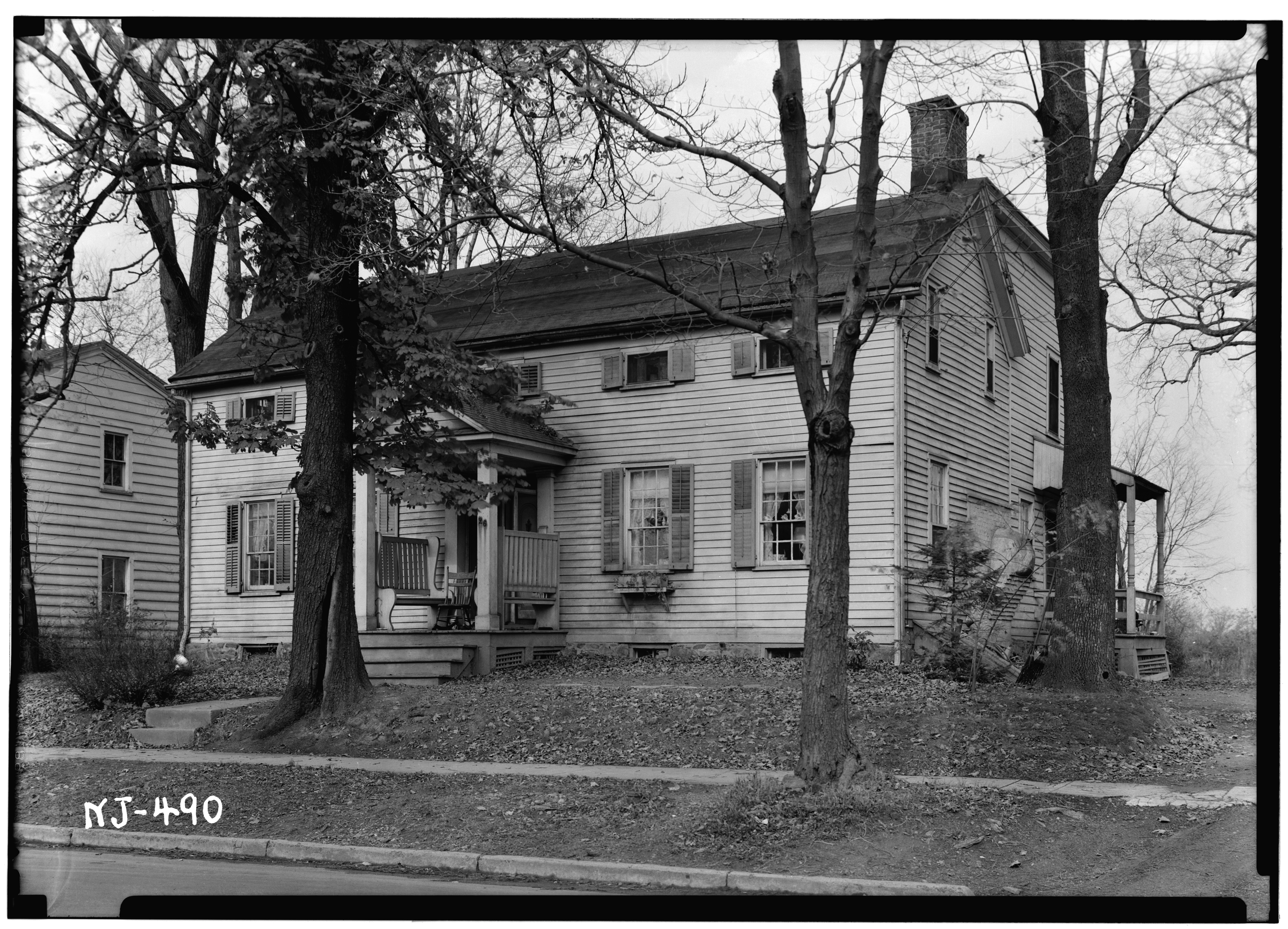
Historic Day-Munn House c. 1938

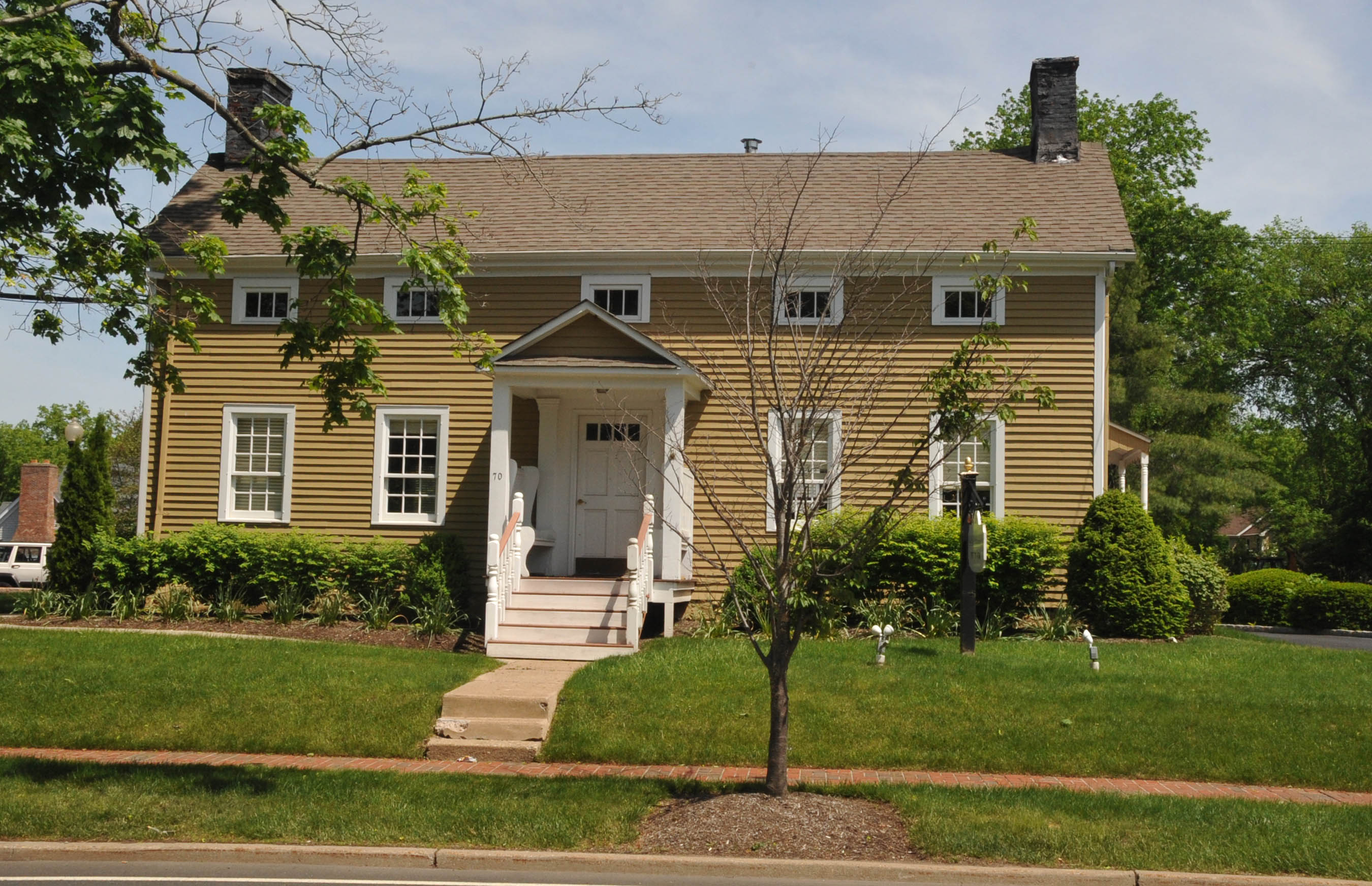
William Day House

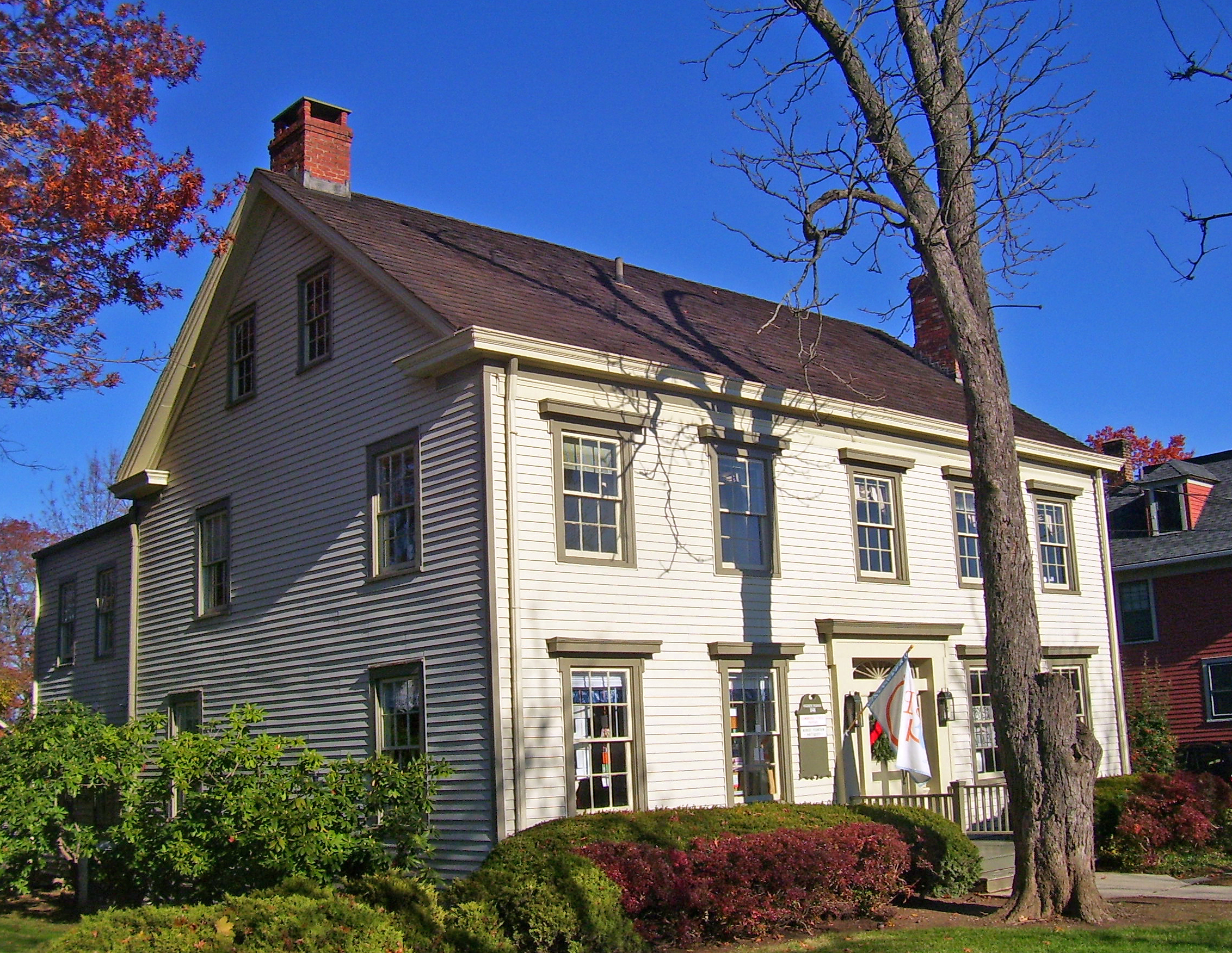
Peter Dusenberry House

At 2.4 square miles (6.2 km^{2}) in area, Chatham was mostly built out well before World War II, retaining homes that sometimes display the dates of their construction during the colonial and revolutionary times. Two houses, now privately owned, survive from colonial times; the Paul Day House, at 24 Kings Road, and the Nathaniel Bonnell House, at 34 Watchung Avenue.

== Geography ==
According to the United States Census Bureau, the borough had a total area of 2.38 square miles (6.17 km^{2}), including 2.35 square miles (6.08 km^{2}) of land and 0.04 square miles (0.09 km^{2}) of water (1.51%).

Unincorporated communities, localities and place names located partially or completely within the borough include Stanley.

The borough is located 20 miles (32 km) west of New York City on the eastern edge of Morris County. Chatham's neighboring communities are Summit to the southeast located in Union County, Millburn (and its Short Hills neighborhood) in Essex County to the northeast, while communities also located in Morris County include Chatham Township to the west, and Madison and Florham Park to the north.

The Passaic River, which rises at Millington Gorge in Long Hill Township and defines the Great Swamp, flows north along the eastern boundary of Chatham. A good crossing location, identified by Native Americans to early European settlers, figured significantly in the colonial history of the community. Fairmount Avenue ascends Long Hill perpendicularly from Main Street in the contemporary center of town to the highest elevation of the town among the Watchung Mountains. From there, one may see the lights of New York beyond the crest of the ridge hills of Summit and Short Hills. Water from artesian wells is stored at its crest to provide the drinking water for the community.

A portion of the Great Swamp extends to the southern boundary of Chatham and other marshes surround the community to the north and northwest. The marshes and brooks in the area contain water draining from the plateau of Morristown and many points to the north and west. All are remnants of a massive lake that covered the area following the retreat of the Wisconsin glacier of the last Ice age. Residents of Chatham were among those in late 1959 who formed the Jersey Jetport Site Association and instigated preservation of the Great Swamp when the New York Port Authority sought to turn it into a massive regional airport. They later were joined by the North American Wildlife Foundation that completed acquisition of enough of the Great Swamp to protect the massive natural resource as a federal park.

The Great Swamp is a major watershed and a significant resting point for migratory birds. The core of the swamp was purchased with the help of Geraldine R. Dodge and Marcellus Hartley Dodge Sr. Several other members of the Jersey Jetport Site Association, including two residents of Chatham, Kafi Benz and Esty Weiss, who were students at the nearby campus of Fairleigh Dickinson University, began to infiltrate meetings of the administration of Austin Joseph Tobin, the executive director of the Port Authority. They attended meetings scheduled quietly to garner the support of union workers. Once inside the meetings, they provided pamphlets in opposition to the project, which infuriated the Port Authority administration. Eventually, other organizations formed to join the opposition to the plans for the airport and finally, a majority of the swamp was assembled to be donated to the federal government to become a National Wildlife Refuge. Stewart Udall, Secretary of the Interior under President John F. Kennedy, lent his support to the local efforts to save the swamp while he served as U.S. Representative from Arizona, making recommendations to the Dwight D. Eisenhower administration to also lend their support. On November 3, 1960, the legislation creating the Great Swamp National Wildlife Refuge was passed by an act of the United States Congress.

Just northeast of the borough is the upscale Mall at Short Hills located in the Short Hills section of Millburn.

=== Climate ===
Chatham has a humid continental climate and is slightly more variant (lows are colder, highs are warmer) than its neighbor 20 miles (32 km) east: New York City.

Climate data for Chatham (07928, includes Chatham (borough) and Chatham Township)
Month	Jan	Feb	Mar	Apr	May	Jun	Jul	Aug	Sep	Oct	Nov	Dec	Year
Record high °F (°C)	73 (23)	82 (28)	89 (32)	96 (36)	97 (36)	103 (39)	107 (42)	104 (40)	99 (37)	93 (34)	84 (29)	76 (24)	107 (42)
Mean daily maximum °F (°C)	39 (4)	42 (6)	51 (11)	62 (17)	73 (23)	82 (28)	86 (30)	85 (29)	78 (26)	66 (19)	55 (13)	44 (7)	64 (18)
Mean daily minimum °F (°C)	18 (−8)	20 (−7)	28 (−2)	38 (3)	47 (8)	57 (14)	63 (17)	61 (16)	53 (12)	40 (4)	32 (0)	24 (−4)	40 (4)
Record low °F (°C)	−25 (−32)	−26 (−32)	−6 (−21)	12 (−11)	25 (−4)	31 (−1)	41 (5)	35 (2)	26 (−3)	13 (−11)	−5 (−21)	—	−26 (−32)
Average precipitation inches (mm)	3.54 (90)	2.91 (74)	4.20 (107)	4.29 (109)	4.38 (111)	4.70 (119)	4.73 (120)	4.42 (112)	4.89 (124)	4.65 (118)	4.06 (103)	4.13 (105)	50.90 (1,293)

== Demographics ==
Historical population
Census	Pop.	Note	%±
1880	738		—
1890	780		5.7%
1900	1,361		74.5%
1910	1,874		37.7%
1920	2,421		29.2%
1930	3,869		59.8%
1940	4,888		26.3%
1950	7,391		51.2%
1960	9,517		28.8%
1970	9,566		0.5%
1980	8,537		−10.8%
1990	8,007		−6.2%
2000	8,460		5.7%
2010	8,962		5.9%
2020	9,212		2.8%
2024 (est.)	10,062		9.2%
Population sources: 1880–1890 1890–1920; 1890–1910 1910–1930; 1940–2000 2000; 2010 2020

=== 2010 census ===
The 2010 United States census counted 8,962 people, 3,073 households, and 2,397 families in the borough. The population density was 3,776.1 per square mile (1,458.0/km^{2}). There were 3,210 housing units at an average density of 1,352.5 per square mile (522.2/km^{2}). The racial makeup was 91.13% (8,167) White, 0.99% (89) Black or African American, 0.20% (18) Native American, 4.85% (435) Asian, 0.00% (0) Pacific Islander, 1.00% (90) from other races, and 1.82% (163) from two or more races. Hispanic or Latino of any race were 5.10% (457) of the population.

Of the 3,073 households, 48.1% had children under the age of 18; 68.9% were married couples living together; 7.0% had a female householder with no husband present and 22.0% were non-families. Of all households, 18.6% were made up of individuals and 7.9% had someone living alone who was 65 years of age or older. The average household size was 2.91 and the average family size was 3.37.

33.5% of the population were under the age of 18, 3.9% from 18 to 24, 25.8% from 25 to 44, 26.7% from 45 to 64, and 10.2% who were 65 years of age or older. The median age was 38.0 years. For every 100 females, the population had 94.1 males. For every 100 females ages 18 and older there were 89.9 males.

The Census Bureau's 2006–2010 American Community Survey showed that (in 2010 inflation-adjusted dollars) median household income was $143,281 (with a margin of error of +/− $14,294) and the median family income was $164,805 (+/− $12,245). Males had a median income of $127,906 (+/− $13,208) versus $59,271 (+/− $14,990) for females. The per capita income for the borough was $64,950 (+/− $5,936). About 0.4% of families and 1.1% of the population were below the poverty line, including 0.3% of those under age 18 and 7.5% of those age 65 or over.

Based on data from the 2006–2010 American Community Survey, the borough had a per capita income of $64,950 (ranked 37th in the state), compared to per capita income in Morris County of $47,342 and statewide of $34,858.

=== 2000 census ===
As of the 2000 United States census there were 8,460 people, 3,159 households, and 2,385 families. The population density was 3,505.9 inhabitants per square mile (1,353.6/km^{2}). There were 3,232 housing units at an average density of 1,339.4 per square mile (517.1/km^{2}). The racial makeup of was 95.79% White, 0.14% African American, 0.06% Native American, 2.81% Asian, 0.01% Pacific Islander, 0.50% from other races, and 0.69% from two or more races. Hispanic or Latino of any race were 2.64% of the population.

There were 3,159 households, out of which 39.4% had children under the age of 18 living with them, 67.6% were married couples living together, 6.4% had a female householder with no husband present, and 24.5% were non-families. 21.3% of all households were made up of individuals, and 9.2% had someone living alone who was 65 years of age or older. The average household size was 2.67 and the average family size was 3.14.

The population was spread out, with 28.3% under the age of 18, 3.8% from 18 to 24, 33.5% from 25 to 44, 21.4% from 45 to 64, and 13.0% who were 65 years of age or older. The median age was 37 years. For every 100 females, there were 91.3 males. For every 100 females age 18 and over, there were 87.0 males.

The median income for a household was $101,991, and the median income for a family was $119,635. Males had a median income of $81,543 versus $59,063 for females. The per capita income was $53,027. About 1.7% of families and 2.2% of the population were below the poverty line, including 1.0% of those under age 18 and 3.3% of those age 65 or over.

== Economy ==
Now headquartered in Morris Plains, Weichert, Realtors was established by Jim Weichert in 1969 with an office in Chatham Borough. The borough is home to Chatham Asset Management, a hedge fund holding a controlling interest in several large media companies.

== Government ==
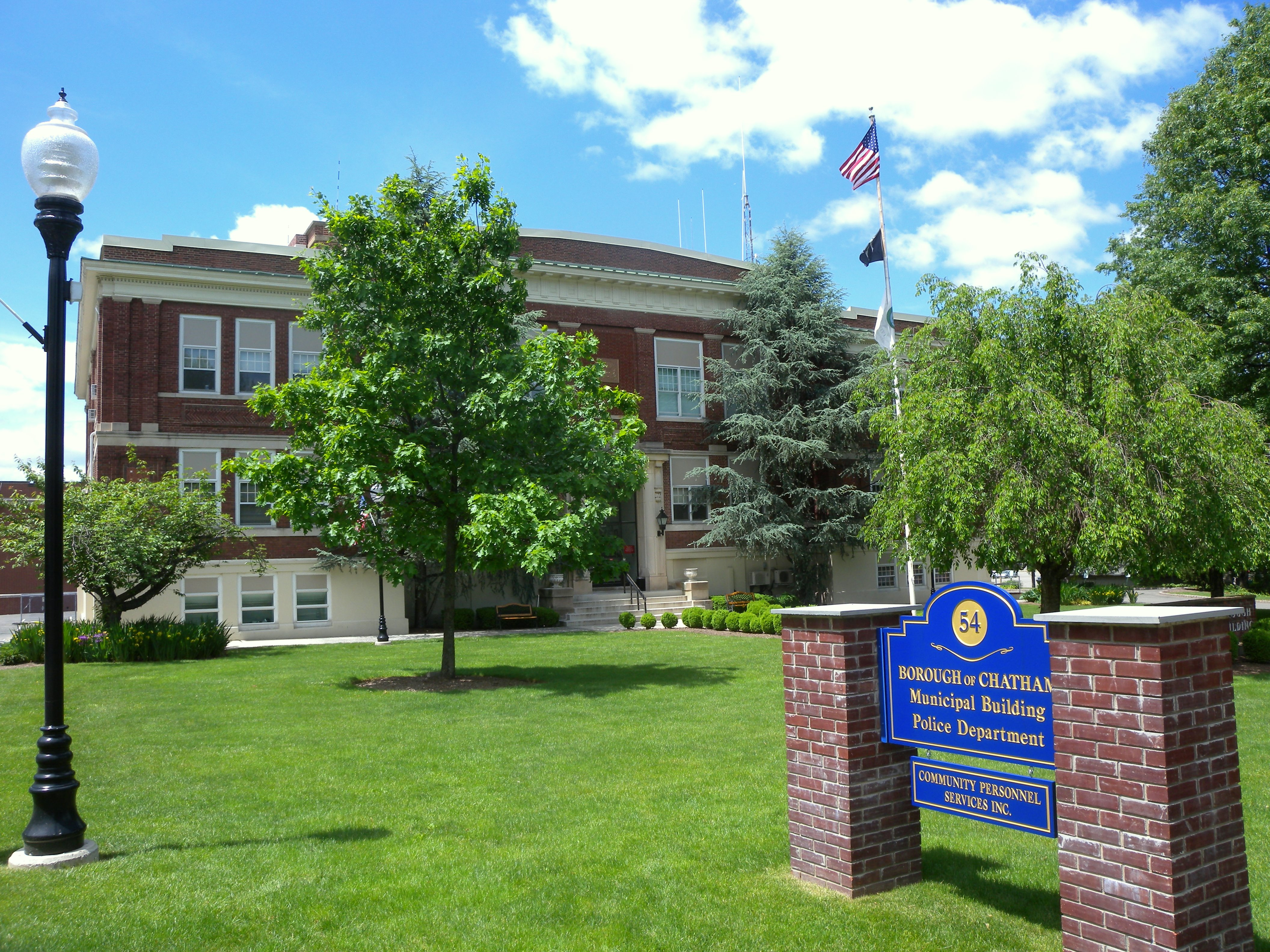
Chatham municipal government building

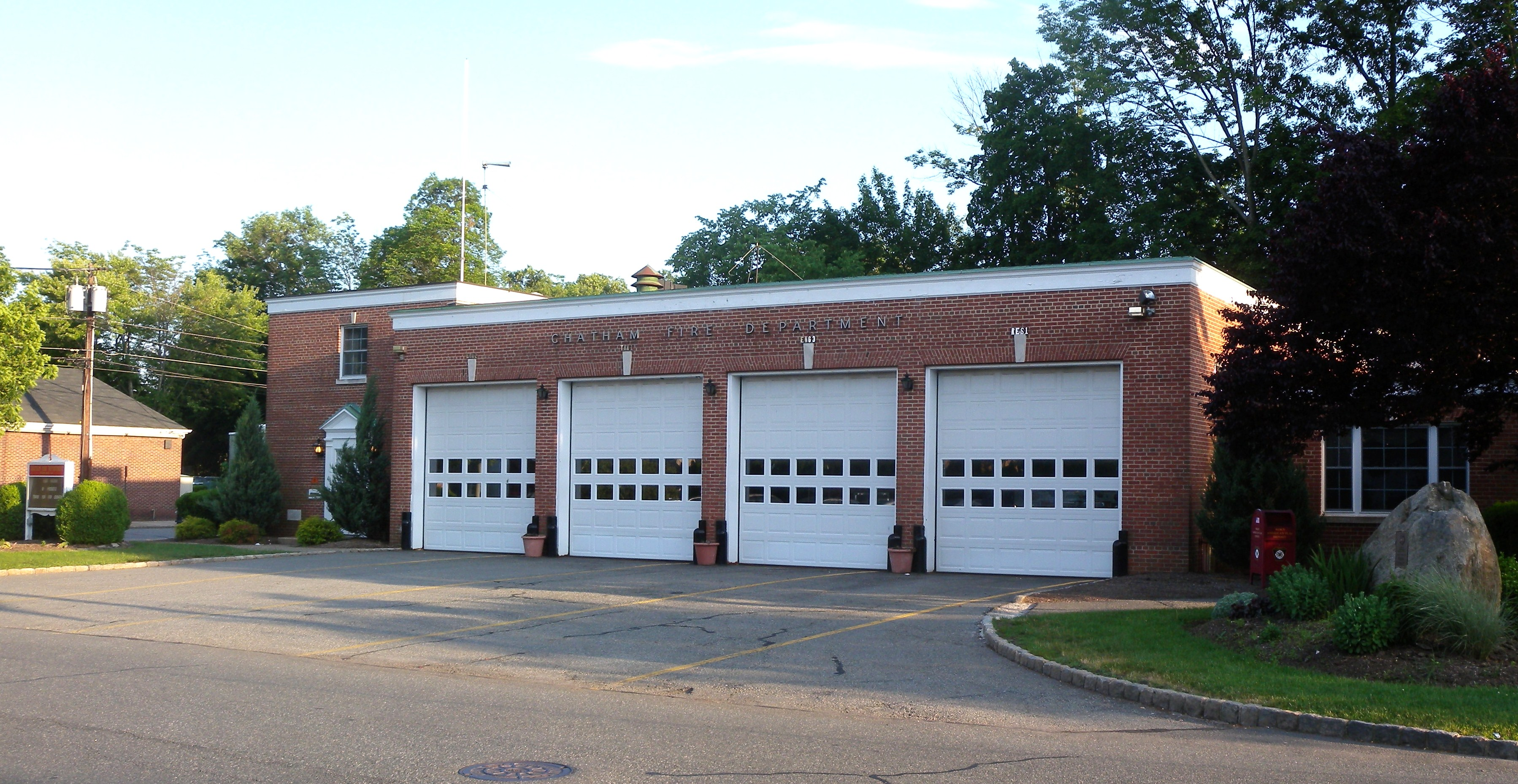
Chatham Firehouse Plaza

From 1614, the area was governed by the Dutch as part of New Netherland. In 1664, it came under governance by the British within the Province of New Jersey, during which a permanent European settlement was established in 1710 that changed its name to Chatham in 1773.

Chatham has adopted different forms of local government throughout its existence. Under British colonial rule, a village form of government was adopted. After the American Revolutionary War, the community became part of Chatham Township, which was founded by new state of New Jersey in 1806 as it was beginning to determine governmental forms. That township also included several other settlements and a great deal of unsettled lands. Unhappy with that governance, Chatham seceded from the township in 1892 and returned to a village government. When the borough form of government was offered by the state, Chatham adopted that form of government by a reincorporation in 1897, and that governmental form has been used ever since.

=== Local government ===
Having adopted several different forms of government since its settlement in 1710, Chatham adopted the newly allowed borough form of New Jersey municipal government during a reincorporation in 1897. The borough form of government is now used in 218 municipalities (of the 564) statewide, making it the most common form of government in New Jersey. The governing body is comprised of the mayor and the borough council, with all positions elected at-large on a partisan basis as part of the November general election. A mayor is elected directly by the voters to a four-year term of office. The borough council includes six members elected to serve three-year terms on a staggered basis, with two seats coming up for election each year in a three-year cycle. The borough form of government used by Chatham is a "weak mayor / strong council" government in which council members act as the legislative body with the mayor presiding at meetings and voting only in the event of a tie. The mayor can veto ordinances subject to an override by a two-thirds majority vote of the council. The mayor makes committee and liaison assignments for council members, and most appointments are made by the mayor with the advice and consent of the council.

As of 2026, the Mayor is Democrat Carolyn Dempsey, whose term of office ends December 31, 2027. Members of the borough council are Council President Brian Hargrove (D, 2026), Miles Gilmore (D, 2028), Katherine Hay (D, 2027), Karen Koronkiewicz (D, 2028), Jocelyn Mathiasen (D, 2027) and Justin Strickland (D, 2026).

=== Federal, state, and county representation ===
The borough is located in the 11th Congressional District and is part of the 21st state legislative district of New Jersey.

For the 119th United States Congress, New Jersey's 11th congressional district is represented by Analilia Mejia (D, Glen Ridge) who was elected in a 2026 special election to serve for the remainder of the Congress following the resignation Mikie Sherrill (D, Montclair), who was elected Governor of New Jersey in 2025. New Jersey is represented in the United States Senate by Democrats Cory Booker (Newark, term ends 2027) and Andy Kim (Moorestown, term ends 2031).

For the 2026–2027 session, the 21st legislative district of the New Jersey Legislature is represented in the State Senate by Jon Bramnick (R, Westfield) and in the General Assembly by Vincent Kearney (D, Garwood) and Andrew Macurdy (D, Summit).

Morris County is governed by a Board of County Commissioners comprised of seven members who are elected at-large in partisan elections to three-year terms on a staggered basis, with either one or three seats up for election each year as part of the November general election. Actual day-to-day operation of departments is supervised by County Administrator Deena Leary.

As of 2026, Morris County's Commissioners (with all terms ending December 31) are Director Stephen H. Shaw (R, Mountain Lakes, 2027), Deputy Director John Krickus (R, Washington Township, 2027), Douglas Cabana (R, Boonton Township, 2028), Thomas J. Mastrangelo (R, Montville, 2028), Christine Myers (R, Harding Township, 2028), Tayfun Selen (R, Chatham Township, 2026), and Deborah Smith (R, Denville Township, 2027).

The county's constitutional officers are County Clerk Ann F. Grossi (R, Parsippany–Troy Hills, 2028), Sheriff James M. Gannon (R, Boonton Township, 2025) and Surrogate Heather Darling (R, Roxbury, 2029).

=== Politics ===
United States presidential election results for Chatham Borough 2024 2020 2016 2012 2008 2004
Year	Republican		Democratic		Third party(ies)	
Year	No.	%	No.	%	No.	%
2024	2,018	36.86%	3,353	61.24%	104	1.90%
2020	1,929	34.53%	3,565	63.82%	92	1.65%
2016	1,806	38.31%	2,707	57.42%	201	4.26%
2012	2,501	54.62%	2,045	44.66%	33	0.72%
2008	2,413	50.46%	2,325	48.62%	44	0.92%
2004	2,678	56.97%	1,995	42.44%	28	0.60%

As of March 2011, there were a total of 5,750 registered voters in the borough, of which 1,368 (23.8%) were registered as Democrats, 1,928 (33.5%) were registered as Republicans and 2,452 (42.6%) were registered as Unaffiliated. There were two voters registered as either Libertarian or Green.

Gubernatorial election results for Chatham Borough
Year	Republican		Democratic		Third party(ies)	
Year	No.	%	No.	%	No.	%
2025	1,878	41.12%	2,673	58.53%	16	0.35%
2021	1,667	45.71%	1,966	53.91%	14	0.38%
2017	1,323	45.57%	1,517	52.26%	63	2.17%
2013	1,770	71.11%	678	27.24%	41	1.65%
2009	1,892	56.94%	1,092	32.86%	339	10.20%
2005	1,668	56.29%	1,238	41.78%	57	1.92%

In the 2012 presidential election, Republican Mitt Romney received 54.6% of the vote (2,501 cast), ahead of Democrat Barack Obama with 44.7% (2,045 votes), and other candidates with 0.7% (33 votes), among the 4,600 ballots cast by the borough's 6,131 registered voters (21 ballots were spoiled), for a turnout of 75.0%. In the 2008 presidential election, Republican John McCain received 50.2% of the vote (2,413 cast), ahead of Democrat Barack Obama with 48.4% (2,325 votes) and other candidates with 0.9% (44 votes), among the 4,807 ballots cast by the borough's 5,975 registered voters, for a turnout of 80.5%. In the 2004 presidential election, Republican George W. Bush received 56.7% of the vote (2,678 ballots cast), outpolling Democrat John Kerry with 42.3% (1,995 votes) and other candidates with 0.5% (28 votes), among the 4,721 ballots cast by the borough's 6,084 registered voters, for a turnout percentage of 77.6.

In the 2013 gubernatorial election, Republican Chris Christie received 71.1% of the vote (1,770 cast), ahead of Democrat Barbara Buono with 27.2% (678 votes), and other candidates with 1.6% (41 votes), among the 2,530 ballots cast by the borough's 6,046 registered voters (41 ballots were spoiled), for a turnout of 41.8%. In the 2009 gubernatorial election, Republican Chris Christie received 56.6% of the vote (1,892 ballots cast), ahead of Democrat Jon Corzine with 32.7% (1,092 votes), Independent Chris Daggett with 9.7% (325 votes) and other candidates with 0.4% (14 votes), among the 3,344 ballots cast by the borough's 5,831 registered voters, yielding a 57.3% turnout.

United States Senate election results for Chatham Borough1
Year	Republican		Democratic		Third party(ies)	
Year	No.	%	No.	%	No.	%
2024	2,218	41.43%	3,059	57.15%	76	1.42%
2018	2,093	49.26%	2,061	48.51%	95	2.24%
2012	2,432	56.15%	1,862	42.99%	37	0.85%
2006	1,775	56.06%	1,342	42.39%	49	1.55%

United States Senate election results for Chatham Borough2
Year	Republican		Democratic		Third party(ies)	
Year	No.	%	No.	%	No.	%
2020	2,234	40.61%	3,227	58.66%	40	0.73%
2014	1,169	50.89%	1,097	47.76%	31	1.35%
2013	906	48.95%	933	50.41%	12	0.65%
2008	2,547	57.81%	1,796	40.76%	63	1.43%

=== Shared services ===
The borough shares various joint public services with Chatham Township: the recreation program, the library (since 1974), the school district (created in 1986), and medical emergency squad (since 1936).

Along with Chatham Township, Harding Township, and Madison, the borough became a member of a joint municipal court that was created in 2010. The court is located in Madison.

== Fishawack Festival ==
First celebrated in 1971, the Fishawack Festival is held in the beginning of summer, on South Passaic Avenue and Fire House Plaza, which are blocked off so up to 20,000 attendees may walk freely in the streets. Local vendors set up booths to sell food, clothing, toys, and various other souvenirs, as well as offering games and rides for children. The festival has been sponsored by the Madison YMCA, PipeWorks Services, and Klas Electrical. Funds generated from the Fishawack Festival go toward various community groups located in Chatham and Chatham Township.

The word "Fishawack" is derived from the Lenni Lenape name for the Passaic River. In a book about the derivation of the name for the festival, Chatham at the Crossing of the Fishawack by John T. Cunningham, the author noted, "Fishawack was the Lenni Lenape Indian name for the Passaic River and Chatham was located at the narrowest part making it the Crossing of the Fishawack in the Valley of the Great Watchung... In 1971, a Chamber of Commerce sidewalk sale day, called Fishawack Day, was held. Thus began an event, which in time was adopted by Fishawack Inc., the governing body of volunteers who turned it into a big biennial town-wide Festival.".

== Education ==
=== Public schools ===
The School District of the Chathams is a regional public school district serving students in pre-kindergarten through twelfth grade from Chatham and Chatham Township. The two municipalities held elections in November 1986 to consider joining their separate school districts. This proposal was supported by the voters of both communities and since then, the two municipalities have shared a regionalized school district. Starting with the 1988–1989 school year, Chatham High School was formed by merging the former Chatham Borough High School and Chatham Township High School facilities. The Chatham Borough High School building was repurposed as the Chatham Borough Hall.

As of the 2020–21 school year, the district, comprised of six schools, had an enrollment of 3,930 students and 342.8 classroom teachers (on an FTE basis), for a student–teacher ratio of 11.5:1. Schools in the district (with 2020–21 enrollment data from the National Center for Education Statistics) are Milton Avenue School with 284 students in grades Pre-K–3, Southern Boulevard School with 414 students in grades K–3, Washington Avenue School with 314 students in grades K–3, Lafayette School with 592 students in grades 4–5, Chatham Middle School with 984 students in grades 6–8 and Chatham High School with 1,315 students in grades 9–12. The district board of education has nine members who set policy and oversee the fiscal and educational operation of the district through its administration; the seats on the board are allocated to the constituent municipalities based on population, with the borough assigned four seats.

For the 2004–2005 school year, Chatham High School was recognized with the National Blue Ribbon School Award of Excellence by the United States Department of Education, the highest award an American school can receive. Milton Avenue School was one of 11 in the state to be recognized in 2014 by the United States Department of Education's National Blue Ribbon Schools Program. The district high school was the first-ranked public high school in New Jersey out of 339 schools statewide in New Jersey Monthly magazine's September 2014 cover story on the state's "Top Public High Schools", using a new ranking methodology. The school had been ranked twentieth in the state of 328 schools in 2012, after being ranked eighth in 2010 out of 322 schools listed.

=== Private schools ===
Saint Patrick School, founded in 1872, serves students in pre-kindergarten through eighth grade, operating under the direction of the Roman Catholic Diocese of Paterson.

== Transportation ==
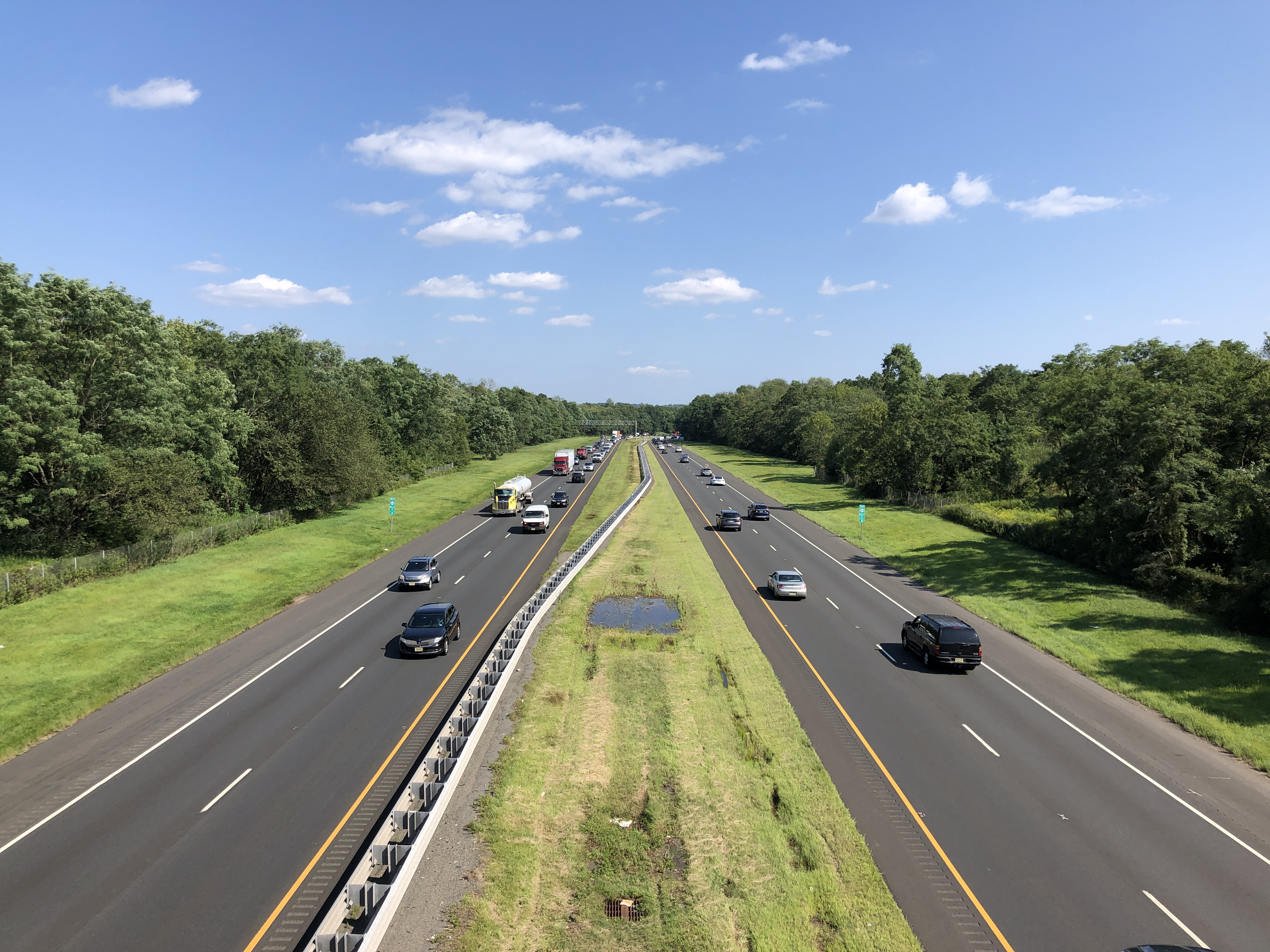
The modern freeway, Route 24, transects a boundary of Chatham without an exchange, the historic route through the community was renamed to Route 124 when the freeway was built - viewed toward the east

=== Roads and highways ===
As of May 2010, the borough had a total of 32.16 miles (51.76 km) of roadways, of which 26.56 miles (42.74 km) were maintained by the municipality, 3.33 miles (5.36 km) by Morris County and 2.27 miles (3.65 km) by the New Jersey Department of Transportation.

New Jersey Route 24 is a multi-lane state freeway crossing the borough boundaries, though the nearest interchange is just outside the borough along the boundary of Summit and Millburn. New Jersey Route 124 is the main local road providing access to Chatham along the route that connected the area before the limited access highway was built. This local route wound its way through the area since before colonial times following the course of the Great Minisink Trail and had been designated as Route 24 until it was renumbered to Route 124 when the limited access highway was built in the late 1900s. The local communities chose to retain their historic character and opted out of plans for the multi-lane, limited access highway. The nearest interchanges with the new Route 24 are in neighboring communities, to the east it is Millburn and to the west it is Hanover Township.

In 1906, the borough received coverage from The New York Times and The Chatham Press for implementation of what may be the world's first recorded use of a speed bump as a traffic calming device. A report from the April 24, 1906, issue of The Times described how "[t]he 'bumps' installed by the borough officials of the village of Chatham to check the speed of automobiles through the village had their first test yesterday, and proved a decided success."

=== Public transportation ===
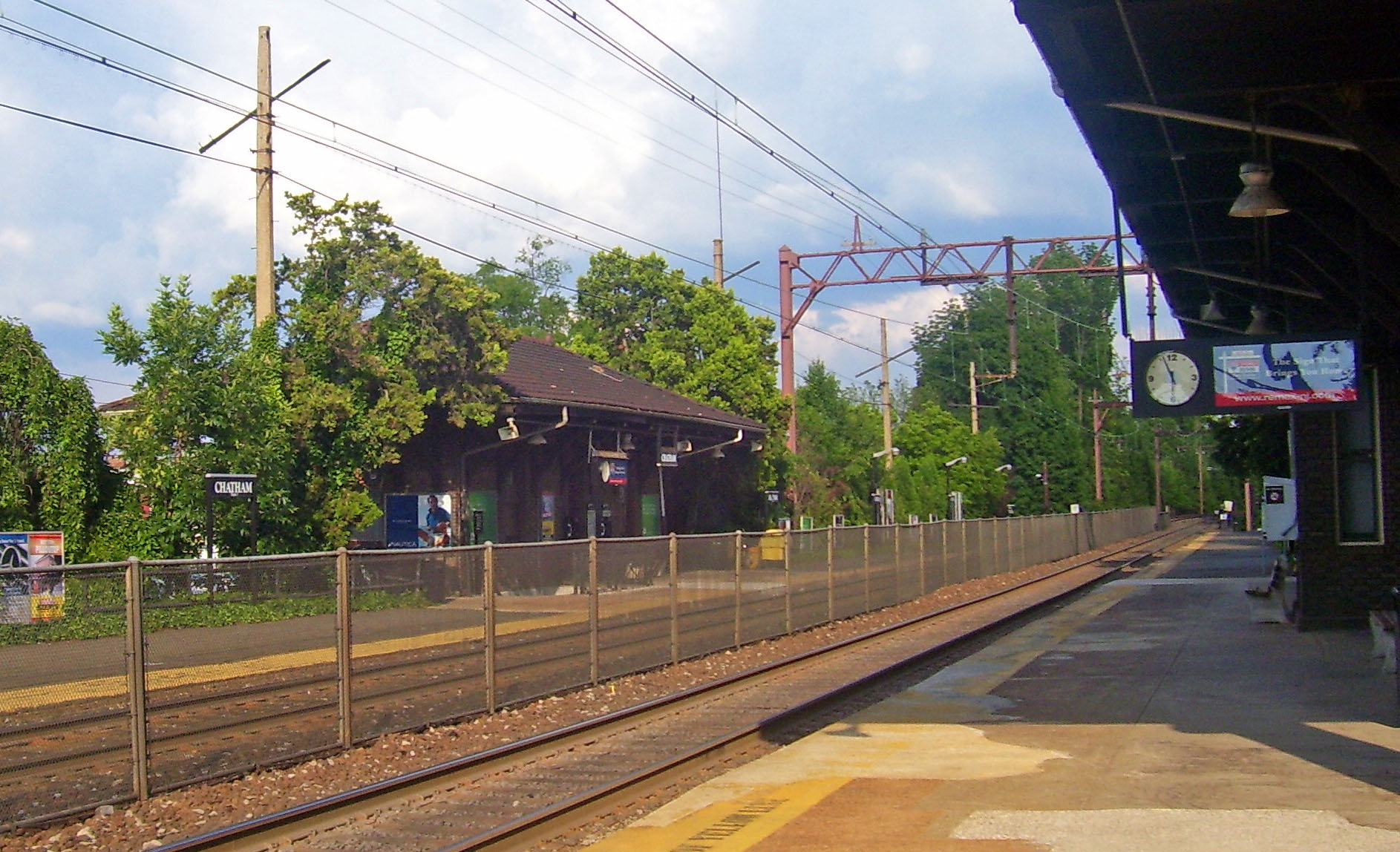
Chatham railroad station

NJ Transit provides commuter rail service at the Chatham station Service at the station operates on the Morristown Line, with trains heading to the Hoboken Terminal and to New York Penn Station in Midtown Manhattan.

Direct bus service from Chatham to Manhattan is not provided by NJ Transit. It provides various route options with bus transfers. Local bus service is provided by NJ Transit on the 873 route to the Livingston Mall and Parsippany-Troy Hills, which replaced service that had been offered until 2010 on the MCM3 and MCM8 routes.

Bus lines also connect Chatham with the other towns along Route 24 from Newark to Morristown, mostly running parallel to the train lines. Nowadays, buses transport people along the line, but stagecoaches and trolleys were mass transit methods once used along the route that followed Main Street.

== Library ==
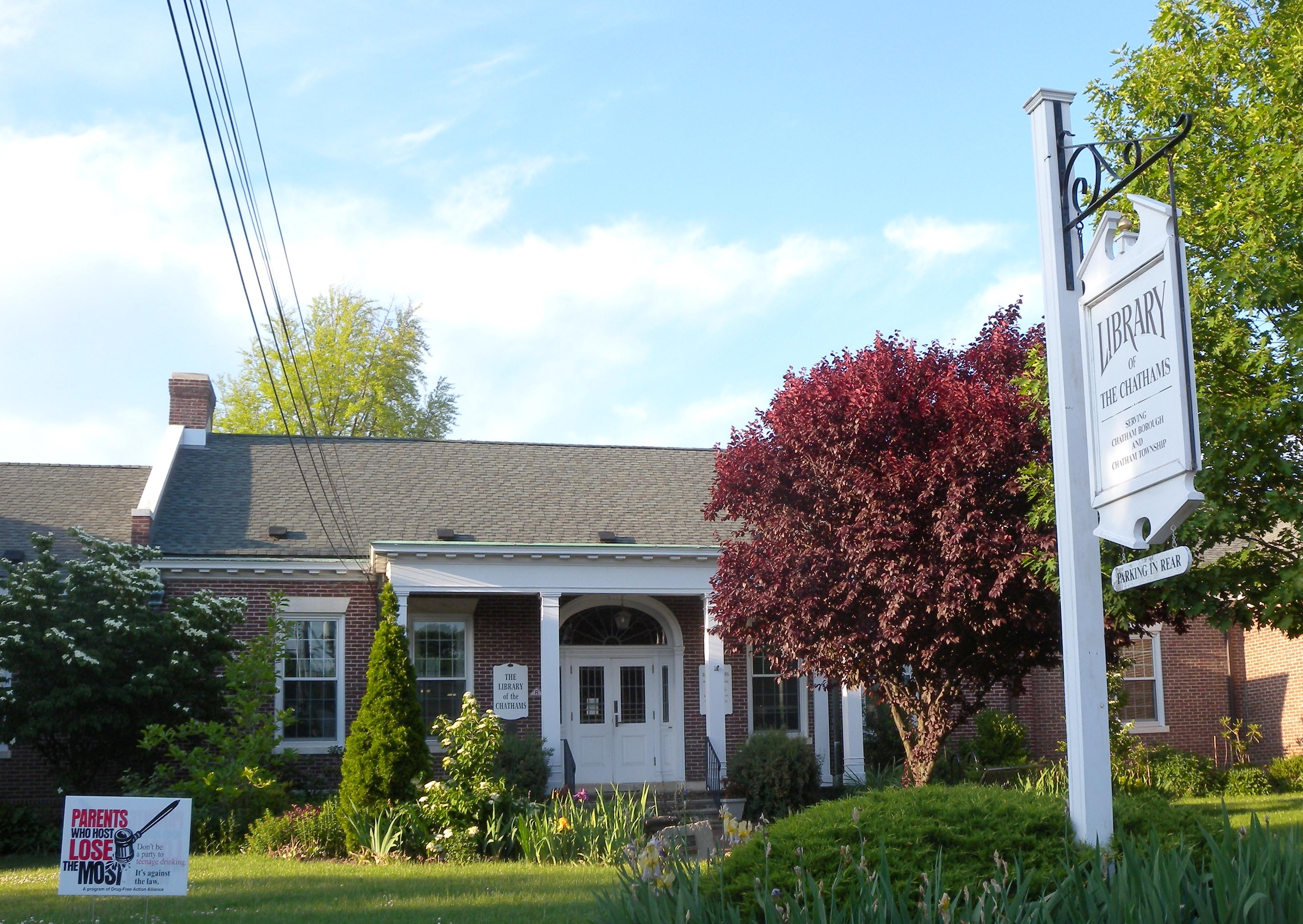
Library of The Chathams

Chatham Library was founded in 1907 in downtown Chatham after decades of discussion and planning. Growth of the collection brought about expansion and movement to progressively larger facilities until the current building was built on Main Street on the former site of the Fairview Hotel, after it had burned down. The hotel land was bought after a borough-wide solicitation of funds that was proposed by Charles M. Lum, after whose family Lum Avenue is named, and a brick building was constructed to house the library. The new Chatham Library was dedicated and opened to the public in 1924.

A referendum on the November 1974 ballot regarding jointure was approved by voters, providing that the Chatham Library also would serve Chatham Township residents. The library was renamed as the Library of The Chathams, which now is administered by six trustees, who are appointed jointly through the two governments via the mayors of the two municipalities or their representatives, as well as a representative from the newly created joint School District of the Chathams.

In 1985, the library joined the Morris Automated Information Network (MAIN), an electronic database created to link together all of the public libraries in Morris County. Expansion of the library with an addition costing nearly $4,000,000 was planned with the governments of the two municipalities contributing a combined $2,000,000. The project was completed and the new addition dedicated on January 11, 2004.

== Sister city ==
Chatham has one sister city. It is Esternay, France.

== Notable people ==
People who were born in, residents of, or otherwise closely associated with Chatham since its founding in 1710 include:

- Ben Bailey (born 1970), comedian and host of Discovery Channel's Cash Cab
- Kafi Benz (born 1941), writer, artist, conservationist and community leader
- Leanna Brown (1935–2016), politician
- Edward Everett Bruen (1859–1938), first mayor of East Orange, New Jersey, and a descendant of founders of Chatham
- Bruce Harris (born 1951), attorney and politician who served as the borough mayor
- Constance Horner (born 1942), businesswoman who served as the third director of the United States Office of Personnel Management
- Shepard Kollock (1750–1839), American Revolutionary War-era editor, author, and printer of the New Jersey Journal, which became the first newspaper in Chatham and third newspaper in New Jersey in 1779
- Ann McLaughlin Korologos (1941-2023, née Lauenstein), United States Secretary of Labor in the Reagan Administration
- Nick Mangold (born 1984), American football center for the New York Jets of the National Football League
- Joseph C. McDonough (1924-2005), decorated Major General in the United States Army
- Bob Papa (born 1964), head radio announcer for the New York Giants
- David K. Shipler (born 1942), author, correspondent, journalist, and filmmaker who won the 1987 Pulitzer Prize for General Nonfiction for Arab and Jew: Wounded Spirits in a Promised Land, won the George Polk Award, is the author of The Shipler Report, and is co-host of Two Reporters
- Barbara Stanley (1949–2023), psychologist, researcher, and suicidologist
- John Tolkin (born 2002), professional soccer player
- Aaron Montgomery Ward (1844−1913), inventor of mail order and a descendant of colonial settlers
- Alice Waters (born 1944), chef and pioneer of the farm-to-table movement

== Historical research resources ==
- Anderson, John R. Shepard Kollock: Editor for Freedom. Chatham, New Jersey: Chatham Historical Society, 1975.
- Cunningham, John T. Chatham: At the Crossing of the Fishawack. Chatham, New Jersey: Chatham Historical Society, 1967.
- Philhower, Charles A., Brief History of Chatham, Morris County, New Jersey. New York: Lewis Historical Publishing Company, 1914.
- Thayer, Theodore. Colonial and Revolutionary Morris County. The Morris County Heritage Commission. (government publication)
- Vanderpoel, Ambrose Ely. History of Chatham, New Jersey. New York: Charles Francis Press, 1921. Reprint. Chatham, New Jersey: Chatham Historical Society, 1959.
- White, Donald Wallace. A Village at War: Chatham and the American Revolution. Rutherford, New Jersey: Fairleigh Dickinson University Press, 1979.
- ______________. Chatham. Dover, New Hampshire: Arcadia Publishing, 1997.
- ______________. "Historic Minisink Trail". Proceedings of the New Jersey Historical Society. 8, (January–October 1923): 199–205.
- ______________. "Indians of the Morris County Area". Proceedings of the New Jersey Historical Society. 54 (October 1936): 248–267.
- Design Guidelines Manual For Rehabilitation and Construction in the Main Street Historic District. Chatham, New Jersey: Chatham Borough Historic Preservation Commission, 1994. (government publication)
