= Jacob Green (pastor) =

Presbyterian pastor and acting president of Princeton University

The Reverend Jacob Green

Acting President of Princeton University
- In office 1758–1759
- Preceded by: Jonathan Edwards
- Succeeded by: Samuel Davies

Delegate for Morris County to the Provincial Congress of New Jersey
- In office June 1776 – August 1776

Personal details
- Born: February 2, 1722 Malden, Massachusetts
- Died: May 24, 1790 (aged 68) Hanover, New Jersey
- Resting place: Hanover Presbyterian Church Cemetery
- Spouse(s): Anna Strong (m. 1747; died 1756) Elizabeth Pierson (m. 1757)
- Relations: Jacob Green (father); Dorothy Lynde Green (mother)
- Children: 10, including Ashbel Green
- Education: Harvard University
- Occupation: Pastor, politician, physician

Jacob Green (February 2, 1722 – May 24, 1790) was a Presbyterian pastor and acting president of Princeton University. A resident of Hanover, Green was also the delegate for Morris County to the fourth assembly of the Provincial Congress of New Jersey in 1776 and served as chairman of the constitutional committee.

Born in Malden, Massachusetts, Green grew up in a Calvinist community and family. He attended Harvard College after an unsuccessful attempt at vocational training, graduating in 1740. His time in college significantly influenced his religious beliefs and was reborn while there. Following his graduation, he was to take a position at Bethesda Academy with George Whitefield, but when that fell through, he was persuaded to become a Presbyterian minister. He became a pastor for Hanover Presbyterian Church, a position he would serve for 44 years. Due to a poor salary, he would undertake various other jobs through his life, with his career as a physician lasting for over 30 years. He was a founding trustee of Princeton and served as acting president for a consecutive eight months.

Green would marry twice and have a combined ten children. He was the father of Ashbel Green, eighth president of Princeton University. Green died in 1790 from influenza and was buried in Hanover Presbyterian Church Cemetery.

== Early life ==
Jacob Green was born on February 2, 1722, in Malden, Massachusetts. (Note: Most sources say that Green was born on January 22, 1722; however, they ignore the 11 day shift from the 1752 Calendar Change. Green himself makes reference to this shift in his autobiography on page 409; similarly, Sprague in his work "Annals of the American Pulpit: Presbyterian" lists January 22, 1722, as Old Style. Rohrer, who has produced the most updated work on Green, uses February 2, 1722 as his birthdate.) His father, also named Jacob Green, was a poor farmer who died about 18 months after his birth from a "nervous fever". Due to his father's death, the responsibility of raising Green fell to his mother, Dorothy Lynde Green and an assortment of uncles and sisters. He moved several times through his youth, resulting in him living with various family members. At fourteen, Green went to find vocational work, but after an unsuccessful search for a suitable trade, he began preparing for college on the advice of his brother-in-law; no one in Green's family had attended college before. To gather funds, he got a probate court to approve an arrangement to sell land inherited from his father's estate. To prepare academically, Green spent a year and a half at a grammar school learning Latin, a standard practice at the time for those interested in attending college.

=== Harvard education ===
Harvard College in 1726, though the college looked the same upon Green's arrival.

Green enrolled at Harvard College in the summer of 1740 at the age of 18 and a half. Green recounted his college experience as demanding, though he placed this feeling on his excessive studying. Moreover, he was a studious student who avoided trouble, winning three scholarships and becoming Scholar of the House while there. At Harvard, he intensely studied theology and was member of a small religious society that met weekly. In his junior year, he began a personal diary that he continued for over 40 years. He graduated from Harvard in July 1744 in a class of thirty. Afterwards, he wished to pursue advanced studies but was too poor, so he accepted a teaching position at a school in Sutton, Massachusetts, for one year.

=== Religion ===
Throughout the early years of his life, Green was constantly confronted by religion. His household was pious, and his sisters would audibly read religious tracts to him. In Malden, he received much religious education from the local Congregationalist church which instilled strict Congregationalism throughout the town. Though, the biggest religious influence on Green came from the books he read. Malden had a connection to one of the most prominent literary critics in New England, Michael Wigglesworth, as he was the former minister for the town. Wiggleworth's best-selling poem The Day of Doom was read frequently in the Green household. The poem was also reprinted in the New England Primer, the quintessential textbook at the time for the region, which Green read from. It had a profound effect on Green's fear towards judgement day, believing he was destined for hell.

While at Harvard, Green was significantly influenced by sermons given by Gilbert Tennet and George Whitefield at Harvard. He strongly supported Whitefield's criticisms of Harvard straying from Calvinism and backed the goals of the Great Awakening. Green was among a group of Harvard students that followed Whitefield on his religious tour of nearby towns, making it as far as Leicester in western Massachusetts. Before returning to Harvard, he visited his mother one last time before her death. Tennet's arrival in Cambridge in late January 1741 stirred Green even more towards Calvinism than Whitefield. He was reborn two months after Tennet's sermon through study, though he struggled through the remainder of college to maintain his conversion in face of Enlightenment teachings.

== Ministry ==
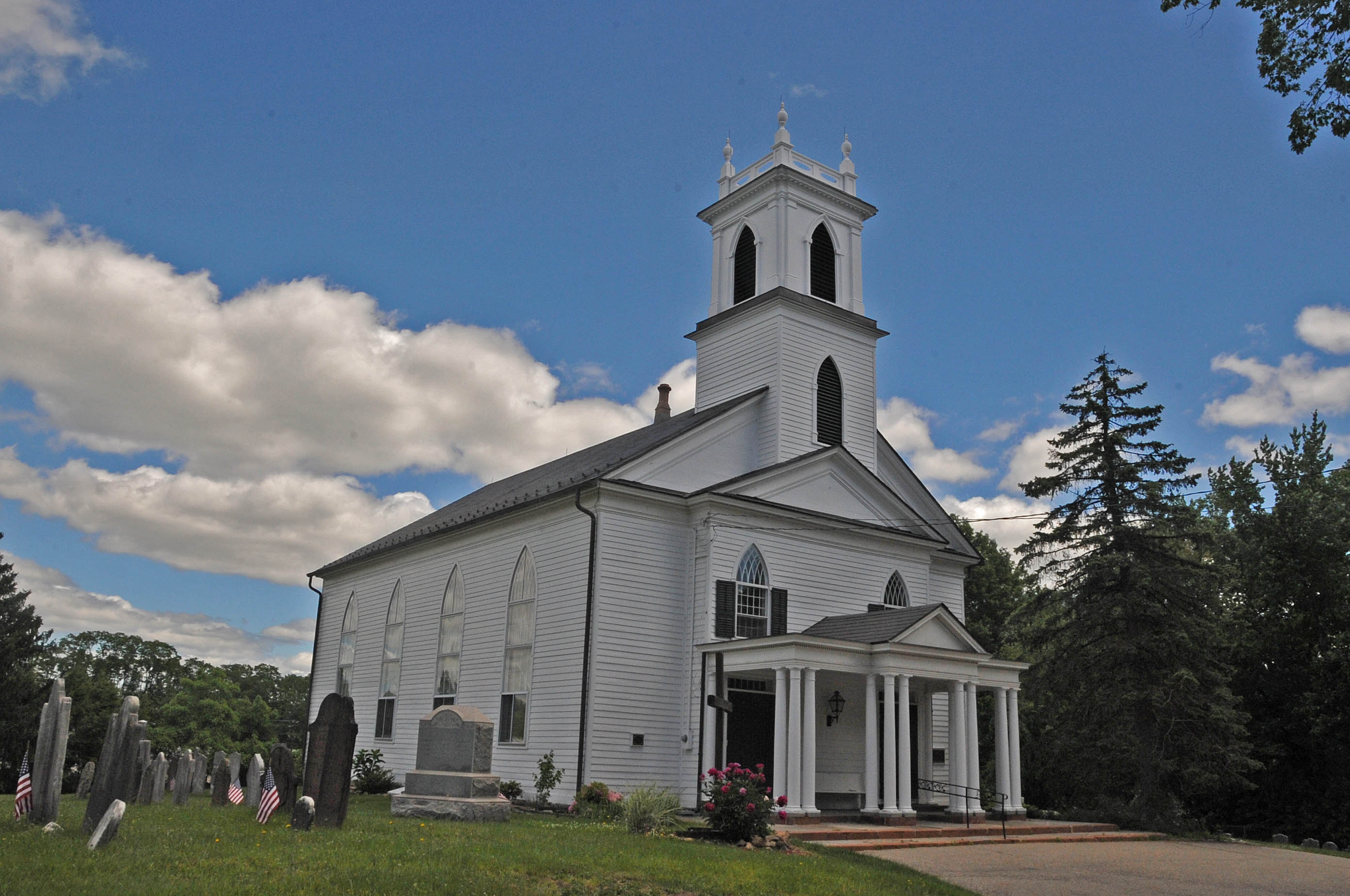
Hanover Presbyterian Church, where Green preached for the majority of his life

In the summer of 1745, Green intended to follow Whitefield to Georgia to take a position at his orphanage, Bethesda Academy. However, upon meeting Whitefield in Elizabethtown, New Jersey, at Jonathan Dickinson's home, he was informed by Whitefield that he could not be offered a position due to a paucity of funds.

Green then consulted with Presbyterian leaders Jonathan Dickinson and Aaron Burr Sr., who suggested the idea of becoming a Presbyterian minister in New Jersey. After consulting with others and additional encouragement by Burr, he agreed to the proposition. His first assignment was the pastorship for the Hanover Presbyterian Church located in Morris County, New Jersey. In September 1745, he was licensed to preach and began a year-long trial, which culminated with him being ordained and installed as pastor of Hanover Presbyterian Church in November 1746. He remained as pastor for 44 years. His congregation agreed to build Green and his family a parsonage in 1754 and would finish construction in 1758; Green would live there for the rest of his life. (Note: Known as the "Old Parsonage", the structure still stands and has a historical marker outside it that was erected by the Morris County Heritage Commission.)

=== College of New Jersey ===
While Green was a devoted minister, he continued his studying, gaining a reputation for his general knowledge and his skill in Hebrew. He was a founding trustee of the College of New Jersey—now Princeton University—in 1748 and served as acting president for a period of eight consecutive months between Jonathan Edwards' death and the arrival of Samuel Davies. He resigned as trustee in 1764.

In 1774, Green built and established a Latin school, where he taught at with eight others, including his son Ashbel. One of those he taught was Mahlon Dickerson, future governor and senator of New Jersey.

=== Money issues ===
Green complained of his salary as pastor being too little to sustain his family, leading to dissatisfaction and anger with his congregation. This necessitated his pursuing other jobs, like farming, speculating on real estate, and distilling. As was typical at the time for farmers in New Jersey at the time, but in contrast with his later public abolitionist stance, Green purchased a single slave to work his farm. However, the slave died around 1756 and Green could not afford to replace him, so eventually Green found tenants who would work his farm instead. When he purchased a gristmill, it angered members of his congregation and ignited a tense relationship. He eventually compromised, promising to consult with them prior to undertaking "secular" jobs. To resolve his money problems, they agreed to him becoming a physician, a common job for preachers. While he received no formal training, he learned from watching other doctors and studying medical textbooks. He would remain one for over thirty years. His efforts would resolve his debts and by the time of his death, his estate was valued at double the average estate in Hanover.

== Later life and death ==
Green died in May 1790 from influenza he contracted at a religious gathering at his church in Hanover. He is buried in Hanover Presbyterian Church Cemetery, along with both his first and second wife; his grave features a lengthy epitaph written by Ashbel Green.

== Personal life and family ==
Green's great-grandfather was Thomas Green, who was one of the first settlers from England. His grandfather, Henry Green, had eight children, with Jacob's father, born in 1689, being the youngest. The Green family was predominantly one of Puritan farmers and craftsmen; Malden served as the geographic center for the family. When Green's father died, his mother remarried to John Barrett, though it is considered that Green and his stepfather did not have a strong relationship due to no mention by Green of him in his autobiography. On the contrary, Green cited his mother Dorothy as influential to his love of learning and interest in religion.

He married his first wife, Anna Strong, in 1747, though she died in November 1756 from tuberculosis; they had four children. Anna's death would strengthen Green's faith and increase his spiritual outreach in his Hanover congregation. He married again in 1757 to Elizabeth Pierseon, who died in 1810, and had six children, (Note: Elizabeth Pierson was the daughter of John Pierson, who was one of Princeton's founding trustees.) with his most notable being Ashbel Green, the eighth president of Princeton University, and Chaplain of the United States House of Representatives under President George Washington. . While Green did not practice primogeniture like many other English descendants with his children, he did favor his sons over his daughters, as only his sons would receive land. His parenting style was conventional for the time.

== Bibliography ==
=== Autobiography ===
Green wrote an autobiography that was published in the Christian Advocate, a religious journal edited by his son Ashbel. While Green wrote most of it, Ashbel filled in parts from his own memory.

- Green, Ashbel, ed. (1831). "Sketch of the Life of Rev. Jacob Green, A.M." The Christian Advocate. Philadelphia: A. Finley: 408–412, 465–68, 522–525, 578–581, 633–637. ISSN 1079-9311.
- Green, Ashbel, ed. (1832). "Sketch of the Life of Rev. Jacob Green, A.M." The Christian Advocate. Philadelphia: A. Finley: 11–14, 51–55, 99–102, 145–148, 194–199. ISSN 1079-9311.

=== Pamphlets ===
- Observations, on the Reconciliation of Great-Britain, and the Colonies, in Which are Exhibited Arguments for, and Against, that Measure (PDF). Philadelphia: Robert Bell, Third-Street. 1776. OCLC 80030443.
- A Small Help, Offered to Heads of Families, for Instructing Children and Servants. New York: Hugh Gaine. 1771. OCLC 1199199362.
- A Vision of Hell, and a Discovery of Some of the Consultations and Devices There in the Year 1767. New London: Timothy Green. 1770. OCLC 977001219.
- A Reply to the Reverend Mr. George Beckwith's Answer, to Mr. Green's Sermon, Entitled, Christian Baptism: In a Letter to a Friend. New Haven: Thomas and Samuel Green in the Old State House. 1769. OCLC 835842685.
- An Inquiry into the Constitution and Discipline of the Jewish Church; In Order to Cast Some Light on the Controversy, Concerning Qualifications for the Sacraments of the New Testament: With an Appendix. New York: Hugh Gaine at the Bible and Crown in Hanover Square. 1768. OCLC 213839965.

=== Articles ===
Articles written by Green were featured in the New Jersey Journal, a revolutionary-era newspaper, under the pen name of "Eumenes."

- "Letter I on Paper Currency" (PDF). New Jersey Journal. 1779. Chatham, New Jersey
- "Letter II on Paper Currency" (PDF). New Jersey Journal. 1779. Chatham, New Jersey
- "Letter V on Paper Currency" (PDF). New Jersey Journal. 1779. Chatham, New Jersey

=== Published sermons ===
- Christian Baptism: A Sermon Delivered at Hanover, in New-Jersey; November 4, 1764. Woodbridge: Samuel F. Parker. 1766. OCLC 976943509.
- Christian Baptism: A Sermon Delivered at Hanover, (in New-Jersey) April 22d, 1778; Being the Day of Public Fasting and Prayer Throughout the United States of America. Chatham: Shepard Kollock. 1779. OCLC 55814681.
- A Sermon on Persons Possessing the Iniquities of Their Youth in After Life. Chatham: Shepard Kollock. 1780. OCLC 55814698.

== See also ==
- Slavery in New Jersey
