= Robert Bowser =

American politician

Mayor of East Orange, New Jersey
- In office 1998–2014
- Preceded by: Cardell Cooper
- Succeeded by: Lester E. Taylor III

Personal details
- Born: December 13, 1935 East Orange, New Jersey
- Died: April 2, 2022 (aged 86) Pasadena, Maryland
- Education: East Orange High School; Newark College of Engineering

Robert Louis Bowser (December 13, 1935 – April 2, 2022) was an American city planner, traffic engineer and 12th mayor of East Orange, New Jersey, a position he held from 1998 to 2014. He was the first 3-term African American Mayor of East Orange, New Jersey and is the longest-serving African American mayor of that city.

== Early life, family, and education ==
The Bowser family had a presence as one of the oldest African American families in East Orange, dating to the 1890s. Robert Bowser was born on 13 December 1935, the youngest of four sons to Edward Bowser Sr. and Louise Pateman. Robert's brother, Edward Bowser Jr., was a prominent architect who was the first African American to work with French Modernist architect Le Corbusier.

Bowser was a graduate of East Orange High School. Bowser then earned a Bachelor of Science Degree in Civil Engineering from Newark College of Engineering, which is now NJIT.

== Career ==
Bowser began his career as a principal city planner for the Newark Central Planning Board and as a traffic engineer for the Township of Montclair. He founded and led Bowser Engineers and Associates, an East Orange-based engineering, planning, surveying, and architectural design firm that grew into one of the largest minority-owned consulting firms on the East Coast. He later served as director of the East Orange Department of Public Works and (acting) city planner, and worked as a school district principal engineer in the Newark Board of Education's Design and Construction Department.

=== Mayor of East Orange ===
Bowser won the 1997 Democratic primary for mayor by 52 votes over (future Lieutenant Governor of NJ) Sheila Oliver, and took office in 1998. He was re-elected in 2002, 2006, and 2010, but lost the 2013 Democratic primary to Lester E. Taylor III, who succeeded him in 2014.

During sixteen years in office, Bowser's administration emphasized restoring fiscal stability, reducing violent crime, and strengthening public education; efforts widely considered successful by local officials and community organizations. He also engaged regionally and nationally through the New Jersey State League of Municipalities (serving on its executive board and committees), the New Jersey Urban Mayors Association, and the National Conference of Black Mayors, where he held leadership roles.
