= Edward Bruen =

Edward Bruen may refer to:

- Edward Everett Bruen (1859–1938), mayor of East Orange, New Jersey
- Edward Francis Bruen (1866–1952), Royal Navy officer
