= James W. Kelly Jr. =

American politician

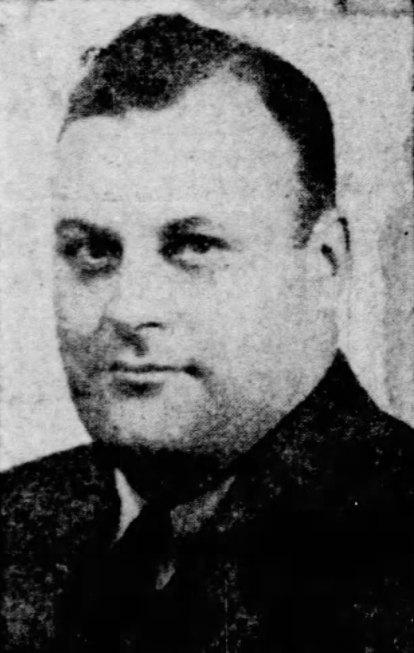
- Kelly in 1946

Mayor of East Orange, New Jersey
- In office 1958–1970

Personal details
- Born: 1911 West Haverstraw, New York
- Died: 1990 (aged 78–79)
- Spouse(s): Louise Harriet Wild; Margaret G. Marucci
- Education: Bound Brook High School; Muhlenberg College

James Whyte Kelly Jr. (1911–1990) was an American Republican Party politician who was Mayor of East Orange, New Jersey from 1958 to 1970. He held a number of other civic positions, including being president of the New Jersey Council of Mayors.

== Personal life ==
Kelly was born in West Haverstraw, New York in 1911. He graduated from Bound Brook High School in 1929 and attended Muhlenberg College where he was a member of Alpha Tau Omega. He was a member of the Middlebrook Players, a thespian company. He married Louise Harriet Wild, daughter of John Wild in May 1937.

In 1965, Kelly, then a widower, married Essex County Freeholder Margaret G. Marucci, a widow.

Kelly received the designation of Outstanding Irishman of 1958 by the Patrick's Guard of Honor of New Jersey, a body of which he was president in 1975.

== Career ==
After college he worked at the Public Service Electric and Gas Company. In the 1940s he served as a city councilman in Middlesex, New Jersey and worked as a purchasing agent for Interchemical Corporation.

Kelly was active in the local YMCA, served on the local board, and was president of the YMCA industrial council. In 1943, Kelly joined Bound Brook company, R. B. H. Dispersions, starting as an assistant purchasing agent and being promoted to purchasing agent in June 1944. Kelly was appointed special assistant to the divisional president of the R. B. H. Dispersions in 1947. Kelly left the city council in 1951. Kelly also served as President of the Essex County Board of Taxation in the early 1950s.

Kelly served as Mayor of East Orange, New Jersey, from 1958 to 1970. Kelly was the first Democratic mayor of East Orange since 1911 and defeated William M. McConnell in an upset. In 1968, Kelly served as president of the New Jersey Council of Mayors. Kelly was defeated in 1969 by William S. Hart, the first elected black mayor of a major New Jersey community.

He died in 1990.
