= William Stanford Hart Sr. =

American politician

Mayor of East Orange, New Jersey
- In office 1969–1977
- Preceded by: James W. Kelly Jr.

City Council of East Orange
- In office 1959–1969

Personal details
- Born: November 19, 1925
- Died: September 23, 1999 (aged 73)

William Stanford Hart Sr. (November 19, 1925 – September 23, 1999) was an American Democratic Party politician serving as Mayor of East Orange, New Jersey, in 1970 and 1978. He who became the first African American to win election as mayor of a major New Jersey city when he won in 1969. He served as President of the National Black Caucus of Local Elected Officials.

== Biography ==
He was born on November 19, 1925, to Margaret and John Hart. He attended Delaware State University and received a master's degree from Seton Hall University. He served in the U.S. Navy during World War II and was a teacher in Elizabeth, New Jersey. He served as an Executive Assistant to Gov. Richard J. Hughes in 1962 and served in the Hughes Administration as the Director of the New Jersey State Division of Youth.

He was elected to the East Orange City Council in 1959, the first African American to hold that office, and was re-elected in 1963 and 1967. He was elected mayor in 1969, succeeding James W. Kelly Jr., and was re-elected in 1973.

In 1972, Hart challenged 12-term U.S. Rep. Peter Rodino in the Democratic primary after Rodino's district was redrawn to include an African American majority. Rodino beat Hart by 13,000 votes, 37,650 (57%) to 24,118 (37%). Former Assemblyman George Richardson finished third with 3,086 votes (5%) and Wilburt Kornegy received 718 votes (1%).

He was indicted in 1975 on charges that he paid a $1,000 bribe to Essex County Freeholder Thomas H. Cooke Jr., the East Orange Democratic Chairman, to get a municipal judgeship for a local lawyer. He was later acquitted.

Hart was challenged in the 1977 Democratic mayoral primary by Cooke and lost.

He died on September 23, 1999.

== See also ==
- List of first African-American mayors
