= Barbara Stanley =

American psychologist (1949–2023)

Barbara H. Stanley
- Born: August 13, 1949; Newark, New Jersey
- Died: January 25, 2023 (aged 73); Scotch Plains, New Jersey
- Known for: Stanley-Brown Safety Planning Intervention

Academic work
- Discipline: Psychologist
- Sub-discipline: Suicide prevention
- Institutions: Columbia University, New York State Psychiatric Institute

Barbara H. Stanley (August 13, 1949 – January 25, 2023) was an American psychologist, researcher, and suicidologist who served as Professor of Psychology at Columbia University and the Director of Suicide Prevention Training at New York State Office of Mental Health. She also served as Research Scientist at the New York State Psychiatric Institute.

Stanley was best known for the Stanley-Brown Safety Planning Intervention, which she developed in 2008 together with Gregory K. Brown. It has since been adopted by hospitals and mental health clinics across the U.S. as a method for suicide prevention.

== Life and career ==
Born Barbara Hrevnack in Newark, New Jersey, on August 13, 1949, she earned a B.A. from Montclair State College and a Ph.D. in clinical psychology from New York University before becoming a licensed psychologist and a researcher. In 1970, she married Michael Edward Stanley, a neuroscientist, with whom she worked and published on subjects related to informed consent and borderline personality disorder.

Stanley's research focused on suicide risk assessment and prevention. She was the author and co-author of over 200 scholarly articles and book chapters, and served as editor-in-chief of the Archives of Suicide Research. She was the chair and later member of the Committee on Human Research at the American Psychological Association and a standing member of the National Institute of Health, Center for Scientific Review's Adult Psychopathology and Disorders of Aging study section.

Stanley spent most of her career as a researcher at Columbia University, later becoming a tenured faculty member and full professor of psychology at the Department of Psychiatry, Columbia University Vagelos College of Physicians and Surgeons. She also served as the Director of the Suicide Prevention Training, Implementation and Evaluation for the Center for Practice Innovation and Research Scientist in Molecular Imaging and Neuropathology at New York State Psychiatric Institute.

=== Stanley-Brown Safety Planning Intervention (2008) ===
She received nation-wide recognition for her work on the Stanley-Brown Safety Planning Intervention, a prevention plan she co-developed with Gregory K. Brown from the University of Pennsylvania in 2008. The plan envisioned patients at risk of suicide verbalize and later write down a simple list of coping strategies, along with specific sources of support as well as distractions that could be relied upon during a mental health emergency.

While suicide prevention contracts had been in use for some time, Stanley's research has proven the efficacy of suicide safety planning as an alternative in dramatically decreasing the risk of suicide in post-discharge period and is said to have "helped shift the focus of suicide research toward practical, concrete and timely interventions." The Stanley-Brown intervention plan has since been implemented by hospitals, clinics, and mental health institutes across the country, including the Beck Institute for Cognitive Behavior Therapy. According to a 2018 study of 1,640 suicidal patients at several Veterans Affairs hospitals in the United States published in JAMA Psychiatry, the Stanley-Brown Safety Planning Intervention contributed to a 45% reduction of suicidal behavior.

=== Death ===
A resident of Chatham Borough, New Jersey, Stanley died on January 25, 2023, at a hospice in Scotch Plains, New Jersey, of ovarian cancer. She was survived by her children, Melissa Morris and Thomas Stanley, and siblings John Hrevnack, Michael Hrevnack and Joanne Kennedy.
