= Ashbel Green =

American clergy member and academic (1762–1848)

The Reverend Ashbel Green

8th President of Princeton University
- In office 1812–1822
- Preceded by: Samuel Stanhope Smith
- Succeeded by: Philip Lindsley (acting)

3rd Chaplain of the United States House of Representatives
- In office November 5, 1792 – November 27, 1800
- Preceded by: Samuel Blair
- Succeeded by: Thomas Lyell

Personal details
- Born: July 6, 1762 Hanover Township, New Jersey, Province of New Jersey, British America
- Died: May 19, 1848 (aged 85) Philadelphia, Pennsylvania, U.S.
- Relations: Jacob Green (father)

Ashbel Green (July 6, 1762 – May 19, 1848) was an American Presbyterian minister, academic and the third Chaplain of the United States House of Representatives under President George Washington. In 1812 he was elected eighth president of the College of New Jersey. He was a member of the American Philosophical Society. and the American Antiquarian Society. Green and his wife barely survived the 1793 Philadelphia yellow fever epidemic which claimed the lives of thousands. In his latter years Green was active in journalism, writing about the events and controversies within the Presbyterian Church in the early to mid 1800s. Green owned three house slaves whom he educated and converted to Christianity. In his latter years Green was the editor of The Christian Advocate, a Presbyterian monthly journal that highlighted religious issues and various social and theological controversies within the church.

== Early life and education ==
Green was born in Hanover Township, New Jersey, the son of Pastor Jacob Green (Note: Jacob Green was the acting president of Princeton University and Chairman of the committee that drafted New Jersey's first state constitution in 1776.Jacob was an outspoken opponent of slavery which was legal in New Jersey up until 1820.) and Elizabeth Pierson. (Note: Elizabeth's grandfather was Abraham Pierson, and one of the founders of Yale University.) During the American Revolutionary War, Green joined the New Jersey militia just before his sixteenth birthday and was soon promoted to Orderly Sergeant. Green would later in life reflect and so enter in his diary that his service in the militia in "had, I think, but little if any unfriendly influence on my religious principles and moral conduct." Thereafter he studied theology and language under Pastor John Witherspoon and graduated as valedictorian from the College of New Jersey, known since 1896 as Princeton University. In 1812. Green was unanimously elected eighth president of the College of New Jersey by its Board of Trustees. (Note: Green's diary was written and compiled when he was between 82 and 84 years of age, posthumously published and annotated by Pastor Joseph H. Jones in 1849, the year after Green's death.) Immediately after his graduation, he accepted the appointment as Tutor in the College, holding the office for two years. Thereafter he was appointed as the chair of Professor of Mathematics and Natural Philosophy, serving for two years. In November, 1785, he was married to the eldest daughter of Robert Stockton, of Princeton. He obtained his license to preach by the Presbytery of New Brunswick in February, 1786.

== Career ==
During his professorship in the college, Green obtained his license to preach by the Presbytery of New Brunswick in February, 1786. On May 15, 1787, at the age of twenty-five, Green was ordained a Pastor. Dr. Sproat presided, with Pastor John Ewing thereafter delivering the sermon, which he later had transcribed and printed. George Duffield gave the charge to Pastor Green to preside over the congregation with the hope that Green's ordination would reconcile differences between the New Side and Old Side Presbyterians. Shortly thereafter he was called to serve as co-pastor with Dr. Sproat; After consulting Pastor Witherspoon, he accepted the offer. At the age of twenty-five Green was ordained on May 15, 1787, with John Ewing delivering the sermon during the ceremony. Subsequently Green resigned his professorship in 1787 and accepted a position as pastor of the Second Presbyterian Church in Philadelphia, which he held until he was named Princeton president in 1812.

=== U.S. House of Representatives Chaplain ===
While George Washington was three years into his presidency Green was appointed as the third Chaplain of the United States House of Representatives in 1792, serving until 1800, together with Bishop William White of Pennsylvania, appointed in 1790. Green, however, was appointed without his knowledge, assuming it was decided without any regard to his situation and subsequently wrote a letter of resignation. Bishop White, however, intercepted White and assured him that the appointment was made with much consideration and favor, and dissuaded him from resigning, reminding him that it was his duty to serve. Green subsequently acquiesced and accepted the appointment where he soon came to the opinion that the manner in which he was appointed had instead been an act of providence.

Shortly after the death of George Duffield on February 2, 1790, Green was chosen to deliver the sermon at his funeral on February 4.

=== Academic administration ===
From 1812 to 1822, he served as the eighth President of Princeton University. He also was a co-founder and the second president of the Bible Society at Philadelphia, now known as the Pennsylvania Bible Society, after having been one of its founding members in 1808.

In 1789, Green was elected a member of the American Philosophical Society.

Green moved to Princeton when he became President of the College of New Jersey in 1812.

In 1814, he joined the American Antiquarian Society.

He emancipated his family's slave Betsey Stockton in 1817, taught her and recommended her as a missionary to the American Board of Commissioners for Foreign Missions, making her the first single female overseas missionary. He also published Christian Advocate, a monthly religious periodical, which he oversaw for twelve years.

== Personal life ==
Green married Elizabeth Stockton on November 3, 1785. They had three children: Robert Stockton Green (1787–1813), Jacob Green (1790–1841), and James Sproat Green (1792–1862), the latter of whom served as U.S. Attorney for the District of New Jersey and was the father of Robert Stockton Green (1831–1895), Governor of New Jersey.

After his first wife died in January 1807, he married Christina Anderson in October 1809. They had one child: Ashbel Green Jr. (b. 1811). On September 28, 1813, Green's eldest son, Robert Stockton Green, died. He was a lawyer of but twenty-six years of age.

In 1793, an epidemic of yellow fever prevailed in Philadelphia resulting with more than 5,000 dead within a three month period. (Note: Initially mistaken for influenza, the Yellow fever in Philadelphia wasn't recognized as such until shortly after the outbreak in 1793.) Green and his wife were stricken by the disease for a time, and upon recovering left the city, and went to Princeton on account of having received word that their child had also been dangerously effected. On October 18, 1793, Dr. Sproat succumbed to the of yellow fever. A month later when Green was able to return to the Philadelphia he delivered a funeral sermon in Sproat's honor.

Green was a great admirer of his teacher, Pastor Witherspoon and in many ways followed his religious practices. Green would always observe the first Monday of the month as a day of prayer, fasting, and humiliation, and daily read the Holy Scriptures on his knees, for as long as he was able. His diary reveals how committed he was to these daily devotional exercises. Moreover, reference to Witherspoon occurs numerous times throughout his diary.

Although Green was an owner of three house slaves he opposed the institution on moral and religious grounds, compelling him to treat them humanely and as members of his household. He taught them religion and how to read, and as members of his household insisted that they attend church services. He did not believe setting them free, having no means of self support, simply to appease his moral conscious, was practical or beneficial for them.

== Latter years ==
Green's tenure as president ended in 1822. That year he discovered that the Board of Missions of his Church was operating with reduced funding, subsequent to activities of rival factions within the congregation. In 1826, the Home Missionary Society of New York was established, and this proved to be an additional burden on available funds in the treasury. , which threaten its very existence. With the assistance of his former colleague Dr. Jacob Janeway, Green resolved to make a concerted effort to revive missionary operations in the Presbyterian Church. During the 1830s, the Green was heavily involved in internal church journalism covering the major theological divergences within the American Presbyterian Church.

Green edited and published The Christian Advocate (Note: Not to be confused with the Methodist Christian Advocate), a monthly religious periodical published in the early 19th century over a twelve year period. The journal featured essays, theological commentary, morality discussions, biblical interpretation, missionary intelligence, reports from Bible and education societies, and the role of religion in American public life.

In 1824 Green was given what was considered the highest honor of the Presbyterian Church in being elected moderator of the General Assembly. Within the Assembly a liberal faction was beginning to emerge consisting of a group of clergymen who advocated a more liberal view of theology and the doctrinal creeds. Disagreements were subsequent, and Green himself was at times at the center of the controversies. As such Green felt it his duty to define and bring clarity to the issues within the pages of The Christian Advocate.

During the last few years of his life Green's health began to noticeably decline, though it was not due to any particular disease. He was attended by Dr. Hugh L. Hodge, who it is said greatly impeded the process of Green's decline in health. The last few months of his life it was next to impossible for Green to even speak, and accordingly he rarely made any such attempt unless absolutely necessary. Green died in Philadelphia, on May 19, 1848 and is interred at Princeton Cemetery, Princeton, New Jersey.

== Legacy ==
Ashbel Green was noted by his contemporaries and various scholars as a man of outstanding religious character.

Historian Robert E. Lewis noted:

Ashbel Green was a man of piety. Even his enemies made this concession to his character. Following the example of his teacher, Dr. John Witherspoon, Ashbel always observed the first Monday of the month as a day of fasting, humiliation, and prayer. For many years he read the Holy Scriptures daily on his knees. His diary reveals how large a part of every day he spent in devotional exercises.

Green's close friend and widely acclaimed theologian and biographer, Samuel Miller, once wrote:

If I had not believed that in this part of the character of the venerable man before us there was not only sincerity but preeminence; not only real piety, but piety of extraordinary elevation and power I should not have referred to it distinctly at all.

=== Archival collections ===
The Presbyterian Historical Society in Philadelphia has a collection of Ashbel Green's original papers, including sermons and correspondence.

== See also ==
- Jacob Duché – Ministered as the first official chaplain to the Continental Congress in Philadelphia.
- George Duffield – Ministered alongside Jacob Duché as a chaplain to the Continental Congress
- William Linn — First Chaplain of the United States House of Representatives
- Samuel Hemphill (reverend) — Controversial Presbyterian minister defended by Benjamin Franklin

== Bibliography ==
- Green, Ashbel (1823). The Christian advocate. Philadelphia: Anthony Finley.
- ——; Jones, Joseph H. (1849). The life of Ashbel Green, V.D.M. New York: Robert Carter & Sons.
- Lee, Francis Bazley (1910). Genealogical and memorial history of the state of New Jersey. Vol. 4.
- Lewis, Robert E. (September 1957). "Ashbel Green, 1762-1848, Preacher, Educator, Editor". Journal of the Presbyterian Historical Society (1943-1961). 35 (3): 141–156. JSTOR 23325169.
- Miller, Samuel (1813). Memoirs of the Rev. John Rodgers, D. D., late pastor of the Wall-street and Brick churches in the city of New-York. New York: Whiting and Watson, theological and classical booksellers. J. Seymour, printer. pp. 480–496.
- Nichols, Robert Hastings (1931). "Ashbel Green". Dictionary of American biography. Vol. VII. New York: Charles Scribner's Sons. pp. 536–537.
- Noll, Mark A. (1976). "Observations on the Reconciliation of Politics and Religion in Revolutionary New Jersey: The Case of Jacob Green". Journal of Presbyterian History. 54 (2). Presbyterian Historical Society: 217–237. ISSN 0022-3883. JSTOR 23328041.
- Sandoz, Ellis (1991). Political sermons of the American founding era, 1730-1805. Indianapolis: Liberty Press. ISBN 978-0-8659-7090-8.
- Sprague, William (1858). Annals of the American Pulpit 1858. Vol. 3. New York: Robert Carter & Brothers. pp. 154–165.
- White, William P.; Scott, William H. (1895). The Presbyterian church in Philadelphia. Philadelphia: Allen, Lane & Scott.

_{Online sources}

- Abrams, Jeanne E. (July 9, 2026). "Contesting Disease: Post-Revolutionary Politics and the 1793 Yellow Fever Outbreak". Circulating Now from the NLM Historical Collections.
- "Ashbel Green Papers". Princeton University Manuscripts Division. Archived from the original on June 10, 2011.
- "(Untitled death notice)". Buffalo Weekly Republic. May 30, 1848. p. 3 – via Newspapers.com.
- Morales, Isabela. "Ashbel Green". Princeton University.

Religious titles
Preceded by Samuel Blair	Chaplain of the United States House of Representatives; November 5, 1792 – November 27, 1800	Succeeded by Thomas Lyell
Academic offices
Preceded by Samuel Stanhope Smith	President of the College of New Jersey; 1812–1822	Succeeded by Philip Lindsley (Acting); James Carnahan
