= Shunpiking =

Act of deliberately avoiding toll roads

Shunpiking is the act of deliberately avoiding roads that require payment of a fee or toll to travel on them, usually by traveling on alternative "free" roads which bypass the toll road. The term comes from the word shun, meaning "to avoid", and pike, a term referring to turnpikes, which is another name for toll roads. People who often avoid toll roads sometimes call themselves shunpikers. Historically, certain paths around tollbooths came to be so well known they were called "shun-pikes".

Shunpiking has also come to mean an avoidance of major highways (regardless of tolls) in preference for bucolic and scenic interludes along lightly traveled country roads.

== Early shunpikes ==
Shunpikes were known in the United States soon after independence. In the mid-1700s, Samuel Rice built a road over the Hoosac Range in northwestern Massachusetts, near the present Hoosac Tunnel. Subsequently, a nearby road for stagecoaches was built around 1787, which became subject to control of the Turnpike Association incorporated in 1797. People desiring to avoid the turnpike fees took the Rice Road instead of the stage road, and so the Rice Road earned the sobriquet “shunpike”.

Contributing to open free travel, in 1797 the thrifty travelers of the Mohawk Trail forded the Deerfield River rather than pay toll at the turnpike bridge; in 1810 they won the battle for free travel on all Massachusetts roads.

A shunpike in Morris County, New Jersey, dates back to 1804; one near Mount Holly, Vermont, was in existence at least as early as 1809; and one in Hampton Falls, New Hampshire, was created circa 1810.

A newspaper article in the New Jersey Journal of March 6, 1804 (p. 4), references a house for sale on Shunpike Road between Morristown and Elizabethtown (Elizabeth), New Jersey. This "Shunpike Road", parts of which are still extant, was in existence the same year that the turnpike it was used to avoid, the Morris Turnpike, was opened for business: 1804. It ran southwest of and parallel to the Morris Turnpike, now called "Old Turnpike Road". It was formed by the improvement and connection of sideroads to enable country people to avoid the expenses of the tolls. Shunpike Road ran through the towns of Bottle Hill (now Madison), Chatham, Summit and Springfield.

When the Hampton Falls Turnpike was built in Hampton Falls, New Hampshire, around 1810 by the Hampton Causeway Turnpike Corporation, a toll was charged to cross it at the Taylor River. "Not content with the payment of a toll, some of the residents got together and built a slight bridge called the 'Shunpike' across the Taylor's River, some distance west of the Turnpike bridge, where travelers and teamsters could cross without charge. This continued on until April 12, 1826, when the toll on the Turnpike was discontinued and has remained a free road to this day."

=== Historical boycott in Virginia ===
An example of shunpiking as a form of boycott occurred at the James River Bridge in eastern Virginia, United States. After years of lower than anticipated revenues on the narrow, privately funded structure built in 1928, the Commonwealth of Virginia finally purchased the facility in 1949. However, rather than announcing a long-expected decrease in tolls, the state officials increased the rates in 1955 without visibly improving the roadway, with the notable exception of building a new toll plaza.

The increased toll rates incensed the public and business users alike. In a well-publicized example of shunpiking, Joseph W. Luter Jr., head of Smithfield Packing Company (the producer of Smithfield Hams), ordered his truck drivers to take different routes and cross smaller and cheaper bridges. Despite the boycott by Luter and others, tolls continued for 20 more years. They were finally removed from the old bridge in 1975 when construction began on a toll-free replacement structure.

== United States ==
=== Connecticut ===
Prior to the removal of tolls in 1985, the Connecticut Turnpike had eight mainline toll barriers instead of a ticket system that was typically used on the turnpikes of that era. While the Connecticut Turnpike was officially considered a toll road for its entire 129-mile length, the placement of mainline toll barriers and the lack of ramp tolls meant the only sections of the Turnpike that were truly tolled were between the interchanges immediately before and following each mainline barrier. Consequentially, motorists familiar with the local area around each of the toll barriers could essentially travel the Turnpike toll-free by exiting before the toll plaza, use local streets to bypass the toll, and re-enter the Turnpike past the toll plaza. Motorists could also completely bypass the Connecticut Turnpike by using Interstate 84, a toll-free highway that parallels the Turnpike about 20 miles to the north.

=== Delaware ===
There is a toll of $4 in each direction on the 11-mile (18 km) Delaware Turnpike, or I-95. It is the third most expensive turnpike in the United States when calculated per mile. Since the turnpike does not use ramp tolls, only imposing a toll on drivers passing through a toll plaza just east of the Maryland state line, the toll is easily avoided by using local roads. By taking the last exit of I-95 in Maryland, MD 279, one can continue northbound on MD 279, cross into Delaware on DE 279, turn right at Christiana Parkway (DE 4/DE 896), and make another right onto DE 896 and soon arrive once again at I-95. Large trucks cannot use this detour as DE 4/DE 896 have width and weight restrictions.

On January 10, 2019, DelDOT opened the US 301 toll road bypassing Middletown. Now all traffic entering Delaware using US 301 must pay a minimum $4 toll at the state line, with access to the old alignment cut off until after the toll point via Exit 2. Several new shunpikes have emerged, the most common being the historical alignment of MD 299 through Warwick or Levels Road, but neither is viable for trucks. A longer distance route involves using MD 300 in Maryland into Delaware (becoming DE 300 across the line) then turning onto US 13 to the free ramp back to DE 1 at Port Penn Road.

=== Kentucky ===
The Abraham Lincoln Bridge and John F. Kennedy Memorial Bridge are a pair of bridges that carry Interstate 65 across the Ohio River, connecting Jeffersonville, Indiana to downtown Louisville, Kentucky. On December 30, 2016, the Kentucky Department of Transportation implemented a toll to cross the bridges in either direction, ranging from $2 for vehicles with electronic transponders to $4 for vehicles paying by mail. The Clark Memorial Bridge, which makes the same crossing less than one mile west of the two I-65 bridges, remained free. This resulted in a 49% decrease in daily crossings on the Kennedy Bridge and a 75% increase in traffic on the Clark Memorial Bridge.

=== New Jersey ===
When taking I-295 north from the Delaware Memorial Bridge to enter New Jersey, travelers can keep left to take the New Jersey Turnpike, or they can keep right to stay on I-295. I-295 runs parallel to the New Jersey Turnpike up to Hamilton Township, at which point travelers would take I-195 east to return to I-95/New Jersey Turnpike, as I-295 would continue north to loop around Trenton before entering Pennsylvania and going south to terminate at I-95.

=== Oklahoma ===
In Oklahoma east of Oklahoma City, Interstate 44 replaced old U.S. Route 66 as the main route in the form of the Turner Turnpike between Oklahoma City and Tulsa, and the Will Rogers Turnpike between Tulsa and the Missouri state line. However, locals have kept old 66 alive by using it for shunpiking instead of the locally unpopular toll expressway, and the state reinforces it by continuing to designate its former route between Oklahoma City and the Missouri line as Oklahoma State Highway 66.

=== Pennsylvania ===
Interstate 70 runs concurrently with the Pennsylvania Turnpike for 86 miles (138 km). Westbound travelers can exit I-70 in Maryland just south of the Pennsylvania border and enter Interstate 68, continuing along I-68's entire length through western Maryland and into West Virginia until arriving at Interstate 79, I-68's western terminus, in Morgantown. After merging onto I-79 north, a traveler can enter Pennsylvania and merge back onto I-70 in Washington, Pennsylvania, where I-70 and I-79 are briefly concurrent.

Despite the added mileage, the relatively non-congested roadways in western Maryland (combined with the various tunnels and pre-Interstate quality of the Pennsylvania Turnpike) make the toll-free trip nearly the same time as the toll route. (The Pennsylvania Turnpike was grandfathered from modern Interstate standards.)

=== West Virginia ===
The Midland Trail (the remaining roadway left behind in the historic Midland Trail) serves the middle of West Virginia and runs somewhat parallel to Interstates 64 and 77. The trail follows the entirety of U.S. Route 60 in West Virginia and the two are synonymous. It traverses through 180 miles of rugged terrain starting in Kenova in the west and ending in White Sulphur Springs. The roadway often follows the historic James River and Kanawha Turnpike and Kanawha River. The trail passes through many parks and communities including the New River Gorge National Park and the state capitol of Charleston.

A much smaller remnant road of the James River and Kanawha Turnpike, is the 5 mile Kanawha Turnpike that runs from South Charleston to Charleston, the road then splits and continues for another mile in Jefferson before merging back onto US-60. This road acts as a local shunpike for commuters avoiding US 60 and I-64.

== In Britain ==
In the early 1990s, the management of the Severn Bridge doubled the tolls in one direction (England to Wales) and made the other direction free of charge, presumably to save on staff costs. As a result, many lorry drivers used the Severn Bridge in the free direction, but when travelling from England to Wales, crossed the Severn at Gloucester, where there was no charge, and then drove through the Forest of Dean. Tolls on the Severn Crossings were abolished in 2018.

The M6 Toll became the first motorway other than bridges to charge drivers. Drivers can avoid the toll by staying on the M6 motorway, which is shorter than the toll road, though usually more congested.

== In Hong Kong ==
In Hong Kong, when crossing Victoria Harbour between Hong Kong Island and Kowloon/New Kowloon, most drivers and businesses prefer the much cheaper, and older, Cross-Harbour Tunnel (XHT), to the Western Harbour Crossing. The toll differences are particularly significant for lorries, coaches and buses. The government proposed a subsidy to users of a third tunnel, the Eastern Harbour Crossing, to relieve the congestion through the XHT and around both ends of the XHT. The problem is now solved as all three harbour crossing tunnels have fallen back to government ownership, aligning the toll prices.

A similar phenomenon exists with the Lion Rock Tunnel between Sha Tin New Town (and the rest of the eastern and northeastern New Territories) and New Kowloon. Most users prefer Lion Rock Tunnel to the Tate's Cairn Tunnel or Shing Mun Tunnels, or the Eagle's Nest-Sha Tin Heights Tunnels as the new tunnels are longer and more expensive. However, this problem is not as serious as the tunnels connecting Hong Kong Island and Kowloon.

== In popular culture ==
The term "shunpiking" inspired the name of Stan Shunpike, the Knight Bus conductor in the Harry Potter stories.

== See also ==
- Fare evasion
- Rat running
- Road space rationing
- Ontario Highway 407
