= First Church of Hanover =

Historic church in New Jersey, United States

- First Presbyterian Church of Hanover
- U.S. National Register of Historic Places
- New Jersey Register of Historic Places
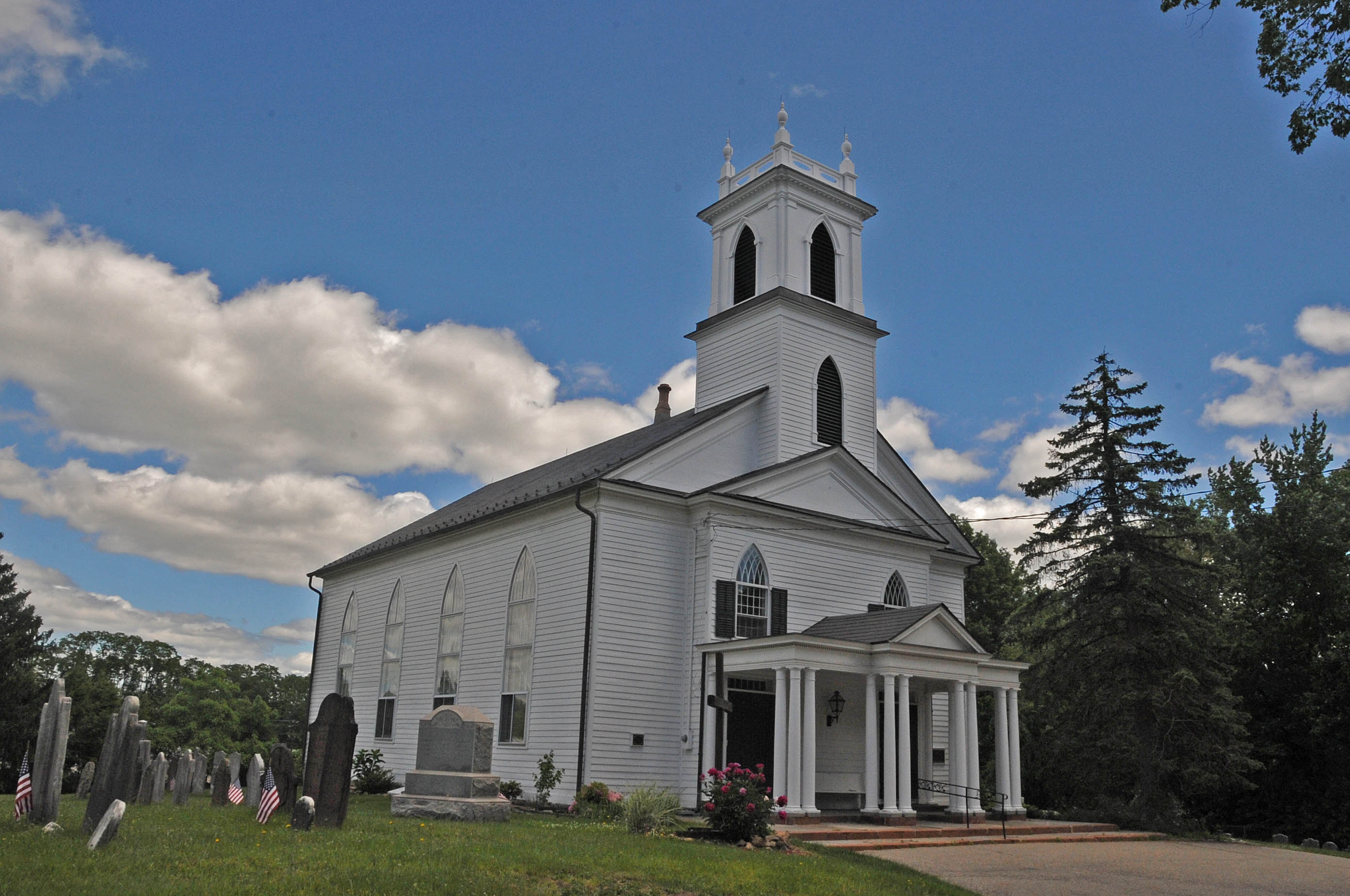

- Location within Morris County, New Jersey Location within New Jersey Location within the United States
- Nearest city: East Hanover, New Jersey
- Coordinates: 40°48′13″N 74°22′7″W
- Built: 1835
- Architect: Elijah Hopping
- Architectural style: Greek Revival, Gothic Revival
- NRHP reference No.: 77000896
- NJRHP No.: 2116

Significant dates
- Added to NRHP: November 10, 1977
- Designated NJRHP: June 13, 1977

The First Church of Hanover, also known as the First Presbyterian Church of Hanover or the Hanover Presbyterian Church, is located on Mount Pleasant Avenue in East Hanover, Morris County, New Jersey, United States. Established in 1718 in what was then the British Province of New Jersey, it is a member of the Presbyterian Church (USA) and is the oldest religious congregation in Morris County. The congregation's current building, constructed in 1835, is listed on the National Register of Historic Places.

== History ==
The earliest record of the church is a deed dated September 2, 1718, from John Richard, "Schoolmaster," for three and a half acres of land adjoining the Whippany River, "in consideration of ye love, good will, and affection which I have and do bear towards my Christian friends and neighbors in Whippany," "and especially of those who shall or may mutually covenant by subscription to erect a decent and suitable meeting house for the public worship of God."

Due to long traveling distance and population increasing, "so-called" sister churches emerged in Morristown, Madison, and Parsippany. The Hanover Church was then rebuilt in 1755 near its current location. The church stood slightly east of the present building and parallel to the roadway. It served as a hospital during the Revolution when an epidemic of smallpox broke out among the soldiers quartered in and around Morristown. It has been said that Washington and his staff occupied the manse which is now remodeled and still stands a bit beyond and across the street from the present manse.

In 1835 the current church building was constructed from timbers from an old building and oak trees from the surrounding property. A few of the timbers in the edifice bear the marks of the hooks which suspended the cots when the old building was used as a hospital during the Revolution. The belfry was constructed in accordance with a design by the architect, Sir Christopher Wren.

Adjacent to the church property is a small cemetery. The cemetery contains many historic grave sites. One of the oldest graves is that of Ruth Burnet, 1750. The other grave sites are that of 52 soldiers, 38 from the Revolutionary War, 3 from the War of 1812, 8 from the Civil War, 1 from World War I and 2 from World War II.

== See also ==
- National Register of Historic Places listings in Morris County, New Jersey
