= Shepard Kollock =

American publisher

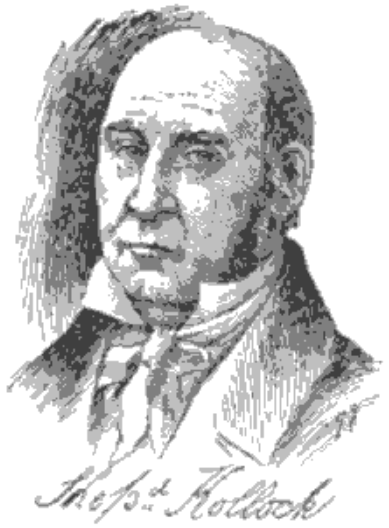

Personal details
- Born: September 1750 Lewes, Delaware Colony, British America
- Died: July 28, 1839 (aged 88) Philadelphia, Pennsylvania, U.S.
- Resting place: First Presbyterian Church of Elizabeth
- Spouse: Susan Arnett (m. 1777)
- Children: 12
- Occupation: Editor, printer

Shepard Kollock, Jr. (September 1750 – July 28, 1839) was an editor and printer, who was active in colonial New Jersey during the period of the American Revolutionary War. He also held various government positions in the newly founded state of New Jersey during the early 1800s.

The New Jersey Journal, which became the third newspaper published in New Jersey, was established by Kollock at his press during 1779 in the colonial village of Chatham, New Jersey, which had been settled in 1710 within the British Province of New Jersey. The newspaper, which later was renamed the Elizabeth Daily Journal, was a driving force in galvanizing support and disseminating information about the Revolutionary War efforts.

His newspaper continued to be published for 212 years following its original publication, until January 3, 1992.

== Early life ==
Kollock Jr. was born in September 1750, the son of Mary Goddard and Shepard Kollock, in Lewes, in the Colony of Delaware, and died July 28, 1839, in Philadelphia, Pennsylvania. He married Susan Arnett on June 5, 1777, daughter of Hannah White and Isaac Arnett. Shepard and Susan had twelve children. He is buried in the First Presbyterian Church of Elizabeth.

== Career ==
He went to Philadelphia to learn the printing trade from William Goddard, editor of the Pennsylvania Chronicle. He remained in Philadelphia until he was twenty. Because of failing health, he then went to Saint Christopher in the West Indies, where he carried on the business of printing.

When he heard of the revolutionary Battle of Lexington, he returned to the colony of New Jersey. He received a commission as Second Lieutenant in the Flying Camp in New Jersey, and in January 1777, was made First Lieutenant in the company of Colonel Niell of the Continental Artillery Regiment. He was at the battles of Trenton, Fort Lee, Short Hills, and other engagements.

He resigned his commission in 1779 and, at the insistence of the Continental Congress, established the New Jersey Journal, in the village of Chatham. The New Jersey Journal became the third newspaper that started publication in New Jersey.

His New Jersey Journal became a catalyst in the revolution. News of events came directly to the editor from the headquarters of George Washington in nearby Morristown. His publication boosted the morale of the troops and their families. He also conducted lively debates about the efforts for independence with both those who opposed and those who supported the cause he championed.

During the evacuation of New York in 1783, he moved his press to that city and established the New York Gazetteer, published first weekly and then three times a week. He also founded a paper in New Brunswick, New Jersey.

In 1787, he relocated and established his last publication location in Elizabethtown and adopted the name of the new location into his original newspaper title. He remained its owner and editor until 1818, when he sold his printing establishment. The Elizabeth Daily Journal, which had advocated for presidents Thomas Jefferson, James Madison, and James Monroe while Kollock was its owner and editor, ceased publication on Friday, January 3, 1992. This was 212 years after its original start. At that time it was the fourth oldest newspaper published continuously in what now is the United States and the oldest newspaper published in New Jersey.

By 1808, he was publishing the Journal of the Proceedings and Minutes of Joint Meetings of the New Jersey Legislative Council.

He also was a judge of the Court of Common Pleas in New Jersey for thirty-five years. At different times, he held all of the more important governmental offices in Elizabethtown, including alderman. He was appointed aide-de-camp for New Jersey Governor Joseph Bloomfield, and was re-appointed by his successor Aaron Ogden.

After he sold his printing establishment, under President Monroe, he was appointed as Postmaster of Elizabethtown, which office he held until his retirement in 1829. He was admitted as an original member of The Society of the Cincinnati in the state of New Jersey after it was established in 1783.

Kollock published several books in Chatham:

- The United States Almanack, for the Year of our Lord 1780 in 1779
- The New-England Primer Improved, for the more easy attaining the true Reading of English, To which is added, the Assembly of Divines, and Mr. Cotton's Catechism in 1782
- Ebenezer Elmer, Surgeon of the Regiment, An e[u]logy on the late Francis Barber, Esq: Lieutenant Colonel Commandant of the Second New-Jersey Regiment in 1783

Today, Shepard Kollock Park, a recreational field named after him, exists in Chatham, New Jersey. It borders on the Passaic River.

== Bibliography/recommended reading ==
- Anderson, John R. Shepard Kollock: Editor for Freedom. Chatham, New Jersey: Chatham Historical Society, 1975.
- Cunningham, John T. Chatham: At the Crossing of the Fishawack. Chatham, New Jersey: Chatham Historical Society, 1967.
- Philhower, Charles A. Brief History of Chatham, Morris County, New Jersey. New York: Lewis Historical Publishing Company, 1914.
- Thayer, Theodore. Colonial and Revolutionary Morris County. The Morris County Heritage Commission. (government publication)
- Vanderpoel, Ambrose Ely. History of Chatham, New Jersey. New York: Charles Francis Press, 1921. Reprint. Chatham, New Jersey: Chatham Historical Society, 1959.
- White, Donald Wallace. A Village at War: Chatham and the American Revolution. Rutherford, New Jersey: Fairleigh Dickinson University Press, 1979.
