= Cardell Cooper =

American politician

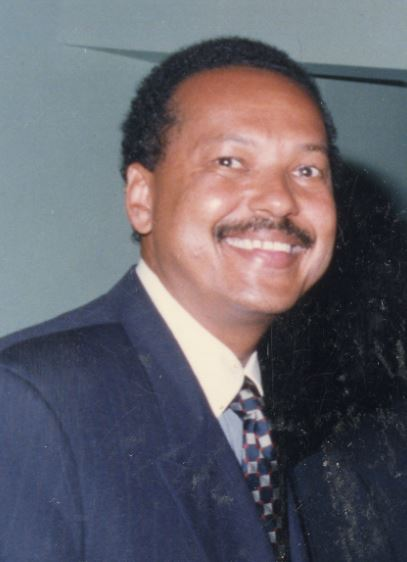

Mayor of East Orange, New Jersey
- In office 1989–1997

Personal details
- Born: July 15, 1952 (age 73)

Cardell Cooper was the Assistant Secretary for Community Planning and Development at the Department of Housing and Urban Development. President Clinton nominated Cardell to be EPA Assistant Administrator for Solid Waste and Emergency Response in 1997 but the nomination stalled and he was appointed to HUD instead. He is currently director of the National Community Development Association.

Cooper was Mayor of East Orange, New Jersey in 1989 and again in 1993. He was the youngest mayor in the city's history.

From 1988 to 1990, Cooper was Administrator of Essex County. He was Business Administrator of Irvington, N.J., from 1986 to 1988. He was an Essex County freeholder from 1984 to 1988. Previously, he was director of the East Orange Department of Human Resources from 1978 to 1985.

Cardell received his B.A. from Montclair State University and his master's in public administration from Rutgers University in 1978. Upsala College awarded him an honorary doctorate degree in 1993. He is an alumnus of West Side High School in Newark.
