= Mayor of East Orange, New Jersey =

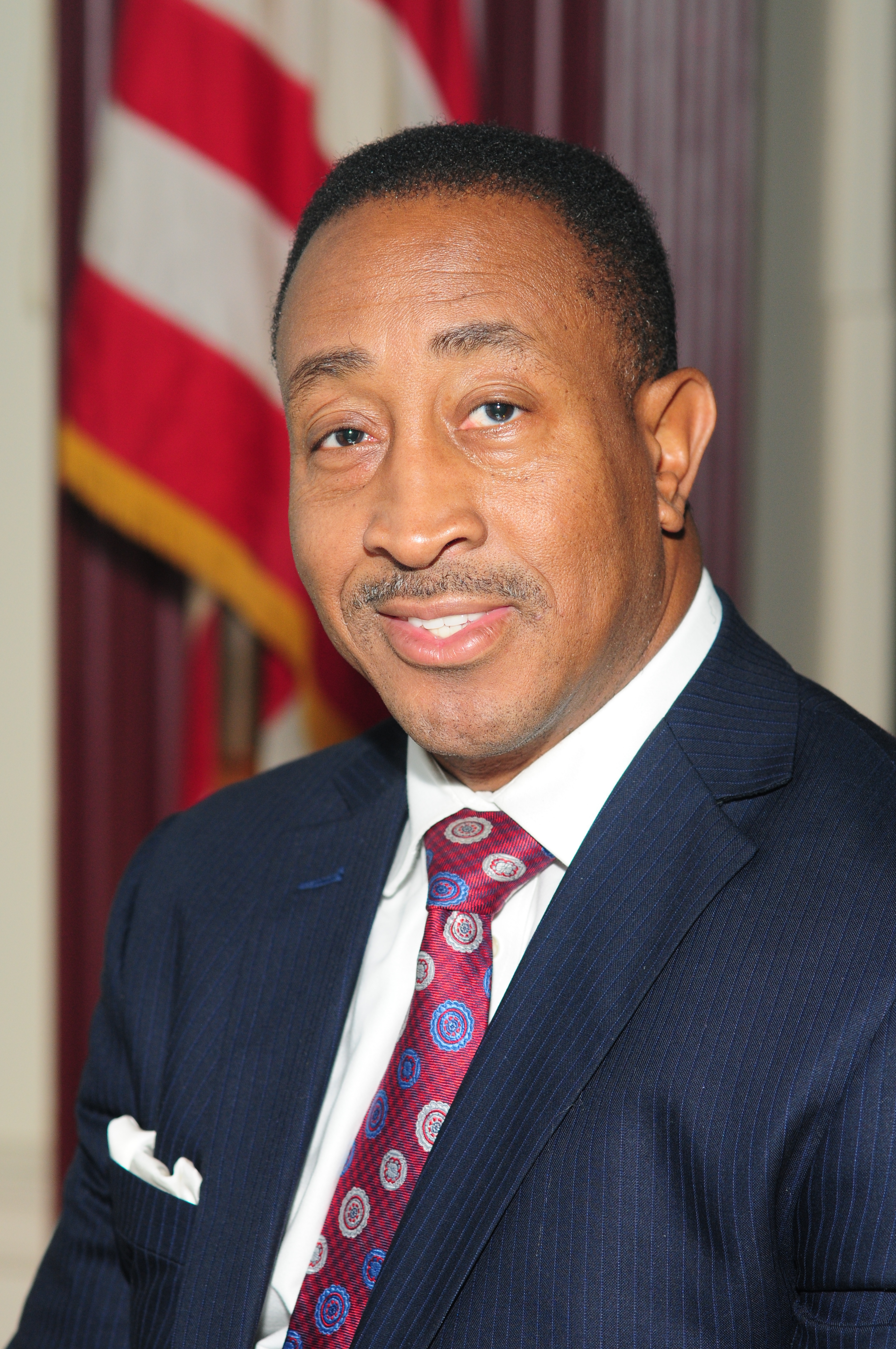
Mayor Ted R. Green

East Orange, New Jersey is governed under the City form of New Jersey municipal government. The government consists of a mayor and a city council made up of ten members, two representing each of the city's five geographic political subdivisions called wards. The mayor is elected directly by the voters. The ten members of the city council are elected to four-year terms on a staggered basis, with one seat in each ward coming up for election every other year.

== Mayors ==
=== Edward Everett Bruen (1860–1938) 1899 to 1905 ===
Edward Everett Bruen was the first mayor of East Orange.

=== James W. Kelly Jr. (1911–1990), 1958 to 1970 ===
He was a Democratic Party politician who served as Mayor of East Orange from 1958 to 1970. He became the last white mayor. In 1965, Kelly, a widower, married Essex County Freeholder Margaret G. Marucci, a widow. Kelly served as President of the Essex County Board of Taxation in the 1950s.

=== William Stanford Hart Sr. (1925–1999), 1970 to 1978 ===
He was Democratic Party politician who was elected as Mayor in 1969 and again in 1973. He became the first African American to win election as mayor of a major city in New Jersey when he won in 1969. He served as President of the National Black Caucus of Local Elected Officials.

=== Thomas Henry Cooke Jr. (1929–2020), 1978 to 1986 ===
(October 13, 1929 - May 18, 2020) was a Democratic Party politician who served as Mayor of East Orange from 1978 to 1986. He was elected to the East Orange City Council in 1961, at age 32, and was re-elected in 1969 and 1969.

In 1967, Cooke became a candidate for the New Jersey General Assembly, running in Essex County District 11D. Cooke and his running mate, Frank J. Dodd, a future New Jersey Senate President and 1981 Democratic gubernatorial candidate, easily defeated Francis T. Craig in the Democratic primary. In the general election, the two seats were won by Republican Kenneth Wilson (19,281) and Dodd (19,101), with Republican Donald MacArt, a former East Orange Council Chairman(17,845) and Cooke (17,816) losing.

He was elected to the Essex County Board of Freeholders in 1970, and was re-elected in 1973. He was not a candidate for re-election to a third term in 1976 after losing the backing of the powerful Essex County Democratic Chairman, Harry Lerner.

He ran for Mayor in 1977, defeating Lerner's candidate, two term Mayor William Stanford Hart Sr. in the Democratic primary. He won renomination in the 1981 Democratic primary by just 321 votes, and lost the Democratic primary for Essex County Executive to incumbent Peter Shapiro by a 2-1 margin.

Cooke made an unsuccessful comeback bid in 1997, challenging incumbent Mayor Robert L. Bowser in the Democratic primary. He finished fifth in that race with just 520 votes (4.8%). Bowser defeated Sheila Oliver 3,991 (37%) to 3,939 (36%).

=== Cardell Cooper, 1990 to 1994 ===
Cardell Cooper was the youngest mayor of East Orange. He would later be appointed by President Clinton to be Assistant Secretary for Community Planning and Development at the U.S. Department of Housing and Urban Development.

=== Lester E. Taylor III, 2014 to 2018 ===
At the age of 39, Lester E. Taylor III became the second youngest mayor in the city's history. Taylor earned his undergraduate degree in political science from Montclair State University and a Juris Doctor from Howard University School of Law. Both a member of the New Jersey State Bar Association and a Trustee for the New Jersey School Boards Association-North Region Association of School Attorneys, Mayor Taylor is also a partner at Florio Perrucci Steinhardt & Fader. Taylor also launched several new initiatives, the Quality of Life Task Force, the East Orange College and Career Readiness Network, and the Mentor Summit.

=== Ted R. Green, 2018 to present ===
Ted R. Green was raised in East Orange and attended East Orange Public Schools. He graduated from East Orange High School in 1981 and furthered his education by attending Cheyney University in Pennsylvania, where he majored in Business Management. He then attended Rutgers University where he received his certification as a Housing Counselor. Over the past 20+ years, he has distinguished himself as a professional in the field of Property Maintenance and Housing Revitalization. From 1990 until 1997, Ted Green served as the Assistant Compliance Officer for the City of East Orange. From 2002 until 2006, he was the Code Enforcement Officer for the City of Irvington Townships’ Housing Division. In 2011, Ted Green graduated from Lincoln University and received his Master of Arts Degree in Human Services.

Ted Green has been active in East Orange political and civic affairs for over 25 years. He is a member of the Third Ward Democratic Municipal County Committee and is active in East Orange Block Associations and Civic Groups. He is also a former Aide to New Jersey State Senator Richard Codey and served as an appointed member to the East Orange Housing Authority to which he would also serve as Council Liaison.

On January 1, 2006, Ted Green was sworn in as a member of the East Orange City Council representing the Third Ward. As Third Ward Councilman, Ted Green served as Chairman of Business and Development for the City, and on January 1, 2015, he was elected as the Chairman of the East Orange City Council, a position he held for two years. On January 1, 2018, he was sworn in as the 14th Mayor of the City of East Orange after winning an overwhelming 96% of the vote.

In 1990, Mayor Green founded the Green's School of Martial Arts, positive programs and activities for youth in East Orange.

While on City Council, Mayor Green has served as a member of every standing committee including Liaison to the Mayor, the Essex County Board of Chosen Freeholders, the New Jersey Legislature, the United States Congress, the East Orange Parking Authority, the Board of School Estimates, the Personnel Committee and Negotiations Team. Mayor Green currently oversees a $150 million budget, and within his first year in office as Mayor, has saved the city over $140,000 by bringing street sweeping back “in house” as opposed to paying a contractor to clean the streets in the community.

Mayor Green also developed the “Mayor on the Block” clean up and community engagement initiative. With members of Property Maintenance, Public Works, Health and Human Services, Public Safety, and Constituent Services, Mayor Green walks through sections of each ward on a bi-weekly basis to assess needs and concerns of residents and address areas that need cleaning, rehabilitation and improved safety. The goal of Mayor Green is to cover every block in every ward. In 2018, Mayor Green covered more than 65% of the city.

Under his administration, crime decreased an additional 17% between 2018 and 2019 with more than 50 new police officers on the streets, while $1 billion of private capital is being invested in the city.

A member of the Eta Pi chapter of Omega Psi Phi fraternity, Mayor Green is married to June Green and is the father of sons Eric Lamar and Salahuddin and the grandfather of four.
