= Edward Everett Bruen =

Edward Everett Bruen (June 26, 1859 – May 10, 1938) was a politician who served as the first Mayor of East Orange, New Jersey.

== Biography ==
He was born on June 26, 1859, in Chatham Township, to Theodore Wood Bruen and Caroline D. Miller. He served as the first Mayor of East Orange, New Jersey, from 1899 to 1905. In 1904 he was offered the position as president of Globe Security. He died on May 10, 1938.
