= New Jersey Journal =

1700s American newspaper

The New Jersey Journal is the name of a newspaper established by Shepard Kollock in Chatham, New Jersey in 1779 while it was a village in the state of New Jersey, which had declared its independence in 1776 from the British colony named, the Province of New Jersey. The newspaper continued to be published throughout the American Revolutionary War and into the founding of the United States, its states, and its evolving local governments. The newspaper, which was restarted as the Elizabeth Daily Journal in 1787, was published until January 3, 1992, which was 212 years after it first started. At that time, it was the fourth oldest newspaper published continuously in the United States and the oldest newspaper in New Jersey.

The New Jersey Journal was an effective force working toward the unification of sentiment, the awakening of a consciousness of a common purpose, interest, and destiny among the separate revolting colonies, and of a determination to see the war through to its successful conclusion in 1783. Newspapers of that time were more single-minded than the people, and they bore no small share of the burden of arousing and supporting the often discouraged and indifferent public spirit.

== History ==
The newspaper was founded by Shepard Kollock, who established his press in the village of Chatham, New Jersey in 1779. The New Jersey Journal was the third newspaper that started publication in New Jersey.

Kollock's newspaper became a catalyst in the revolution. News of events came directly to the editor from George Washington's headquarters in nearby Morristown, boosting the morale of the troops and their families, and he conducted lively debates about the efforts for independence with those who opposed and supported the cause he championed.

During the evacuation of New York in 1783, he moved his press to that city and established the New York Gazetteer, initially published weekly and then three times a week. He also started a newspaper in New Brunswick, New Jersey.

In 1787, he relocated and established his last publication location in Elizabethtown and adopted the name of the new location into his original newspaper title. He remained its owner and editor until 1818 when he sold his printing establishment.

The Elizabeth Daily Journal, which had advocated for presidents Thomas Jefferson, James Madison, and James Monroe while Kollock was its owner and editor, ceased publication on Friday, January 3, 1992, after 212 years from its original start, the fourth oldest newspaper published continuously in the United States and the oldest newspaper published in New Jersey.

== Other Kollock press publications ==
Kollock also published several books on his press in Chatham:

- The United States Almanack, for the Year of our Lord 1780 in 1779
- The New-England Primer Improved, for the more easy attaining the true Reading of English, To which is added, the Assembly of Divines, and Mr. Cotton's Catechism in 1782
- Ebenezer Elmer, Surgeon of the Regiment, An e[u]logy on the late Francis Barber, Esq: Lieutenant Colonel Commandant of the Second New-Jersey Regiment in 1783

By 1808, he was publishing the "Journal of the Proceedings" and "Minutes of Joint Meetings" of the New Jersey Legislative Council.
