= Chatham Borough High School =

Defunct high school in Morris County, New Jersey, US

Location
- 40.7384937°N 74.3848866°W

Information
- Closed: 1988

Chatham Borough High School was a public high school that existed until 1988 in Chatham Borough, in Morris County, in the U.S. state of New Jersey. The school became defunct when the Borough and Chatham Township merged their independent school systems to create the School District of the Chathams. The current Chatham High School shared by both municipalities occupies the building that had been used by Chatham Township High School.

== History ==
The borough's board of education informed the Chatham Township in 1953 district that the high school would not be able to accommodate township students after the 1959-60 school year, leading the township's board of education to consider establishing a regional district or constructing its own high school. Voters in Chatham Township approved the building of a high school in September 1960, with a referendum to spend $1,750,000 in a bond offering passing by a 4-1 margin and completion expected in time for the 1962-63 school year. Chatham Township High School opened to students in September 1962 for grades seven through nine, with students still in Chatham Borough High School completing their education there.

The graduating class of 1911, the school's first, included six students. The class of 1988, with a total of 105 seniors, was the 76th and final graduating class of the borough's high school.

The Chatham Borough High School building was repurposed as the Chatham Borough Hall.

== Athletics ==
The school's sports teams were known as the Eskies.

The ice hockey team won the Gordon Cup in 1962, 1967 and 1968.

The baseball team won the North II Group I state sectional final in 1970 and won the Group I state title in 1979, defeating Burlington Township High School in the finals of the tournament.

== Notable alumni ==
- Ben Bailey (born 1970, class of 1988), host of Cash Cab.
