= I. Kathleen Hagen =

American doctor and murderer

Idella Kathleen Hagen (November 15, 1945 – April 18, 2015) was a former medical doctor who gained notoriety for being accused of murder by asphyxia of her parents, Idella Hagen, aged 92, and James Hagen, aged 86, with a plastic bag and a pillow as they slept in their home in Chatham Township, New Jersey, in August 2000. A month earlier, she had returned to her parents' house from her home in the Virgin Islands because of their age and deteriorating health. Hagen, a woman of considerable means, had previously cut short a medical career in urology in 1987 to move to the Virgin Islands to operate an inn with her second husband.

== Education and professional career ==
Raised in Chatham Township, Hagen graduated from Chatham High School in 1963.

A 1973 graduate of the Harvard Medical School, she became the first woman appointed a resident in urology at the Massachusetts General Hospital in Boston. She was appointed chief of urology at the Rutgers Medical School in New Jersey in 1982.

== Trial ==
The defense argued for an insanity plea. A defense psychiatrist, Robert L. Sadoff, stated that soon after Hagen returned to her home on Fairmount Avenue, Chatham New Jersey. Her chronic depression deepened because of her two failed marriages, the loss of her medical career, her fears about her parents' health, and her own fears that her depression would lead to institutionalization.

Both Sadoff and Dr. Steven Simring, who testified for the prosecution, said Hagen's depression deepened significantly in August 2000, to the point where she thought she was receiving messages from televisions ads, traffic lights and playing cards. They said she also heard a male voice she took to be her father's commanding her to commit the murders because, once they occurred, she and her parents would go to what Simring called a "childlike, magical sphere where they'd regain their happiness."

Deborah Factor, an assistant Morris County prosecutor, asked the psychiatrists if they considered the patricide-matricide acts of vindictiveness or mercy killings, and they both answered no.

== Acquittal and confinement ==
A New Jersey judge acquitted Hagen of charges after two psychiatrists testified that she was psychotic at the time.

After the psychiatrists agreed that Hagen had been depressed for years, was delusional during the murders and was now suicidal, Judge B. Theodore Bozonelis found her not guilty on grounds of insanity and committed her to a state mental health institution.

Judge Bozonelis did not order a specific term of confinement, but said he believed that she required long-term treatment in an institution because she is prone to unpredictable bouts of psychosis and is a danger to herself and society. Under the law, he said, Hagen was entitled to periodic hearings and reviews about her recovery and continued confinement.

Hagen was finally released by the hospital. This led to the creation of New Jersey's Kean's law that requires the police to notify residents when psychotic patients are released.

== Death ==
Hagen died, aged 69, on April 18, 2015, at her home. She was cremated.
