= Chatham High School (New Jersey) =

High school in Morris County, New Jersey, US

Location
- 255 Lafayette Avenue; Chatham Township, Morris County, New Jersey 07928; United States
- 40.731568°N 74.401259°W

Information
- Type: Public high school
- Established: July 1988
- NCES School ID: 340000406014
- Principal: Douglas M. Walker
- Faculty: 99.9 FTEs
- Grades: 9-12
- Enrollment: 1,205 (as of 2024–25)
- Student to teacher ratio: 12.1:1
- Campus: Suburban
- Colors: Navy blue and white
- Athletics conference: Northwest Jersey Athletic Conference (general); North Jersey Super Football Conference (football)
- Team name: Cougars
- Newspaper: The Chronicle
- Yearbook: The Spectrum
- Website: www.chatham-nj.org/o/chs

Chatham High School is an American four-year comprehensive public high school in Chatham Township, in Morris County, in the U.S. state of New Jersey, operating as part of the School District of the Chathams and serving students in ninth through twelfth grades from both Chatham Borough and Chatham Township. The school is accredited by the New Jersey Department of Education.

As of the 2024–25 school year, the school had an enrollment of 1,205 students and 99.9 classroom teachers (on an FTE basis), for a student–teacher ratio of 12.1:1. There were 16 students (1.3% of enrollment) eligible for free lunch and 13 (1.1% of students) eligible for reduced-cost lunch.

== History ==
The original Chatham Borough High School on Fairmount Avenue adjacent to the Chatham train station in Chatham Borough is a historic early twentieth century Gothic Revival building that still bears the name on its façade. Secondary level students from Chatham Township were bused to it and later to a senior high school on Main Street until 1966 under the auspices of the former Chatham Board of Education.

From 1966 through 1988, Chatham Township students attended the newly constructed Chatham Township High School on Lafayette Avenue, the building that is now used as the unified Chatham High School. Chatham Borough students attended the old Chatham High School, renamed Chatham Borough High School. The team names of Chatham Township High School was the Gladiators and the team name of Chatham Borough High School was the Eskies. The two schools were strong rivals at homecoming games for the 22 years that they were separate high schools. The school mascot for the combined Chatham High School is the Cougar.

The new regional high school, serving both municipalities, was dedicated at Lafayette Avenue after the creation of the School District of the Chathams on July 1, 1988, and joined the Lafayette Elementary School on its original site. The two schools share performing arts facilities. The former Chatham Borough High School became Chatham Middle School, serving grades 6–8.

The school and several students were featured in the PBS program Frontline in 2008 for an episode related to a generation growing up with the internet.

During the 2007–08 school year, Chatham High School stopped giving midterm exams. Instead of midterm exams, students must complete alternate assessment projects, a move strongly supported by co-principal Michael LaSusa and backed by the School District of the Chathams. However, according to student poll data, a majority of students do not support the changes and would like to revert to midterms again. This policy continued into the 2008–09 school year. Currently, most classes have three more heavily weighted exams or assignments at the end of each third of the school year, although the student transcripts continue to report quarterly.

== Awards, recognition and rankings ==
For the 2004–05 school year, the high school was recognized with the Blue Ribbon School Award of Excellence by the United States Department of Education, the highest award an American school can receive for excellence in the No Child Left Behind Act.

The school was the 4th-ranked public high school in New Jersey out of 305 schools statewide in New Jersey Monthly magazine's September 2018 cover story on the state's "Top Public High Schools", using a new ranking methodology. The school had been ranked 20th in the state of 328 schools in 2012, after being ranked 8th in 2010 out of 322 schools listed. The magazine ranked the school 10th in 2008 out of 316 schools. The school was ranked 12th in the magazine's September 2006 issue, which included 316 schools across the state. Schooldigger.com ranked the school tied for 47th out of 381 public high schools statewide in its 2011 rankings (a decrease of 8 positions from the 2010 ranking) which were based on the combined percentage of students classified as proficient or above proficient on the mathematics (91.6%) and language arts literacy (98.3%) components of the High School Proficiency Assessment (HSPA).

In the 2011 "Ranking America's High Schools" issue by The Washington Post, the school was ranked 15th in New Jersey and 647th nationwide.

In its 2013 report on "America's Best High Schools", The Daily Beast ranked the school 173rd in the nation among participating public high schools and 11th overall (and fifth of non-magnet schools) among schools in New Jersey. The school was ranked 183rd in the nation and 14th in New Jersey on the list of "America's Best High Schools 2012" prepared by The Daily Beast / Newsweek, with rankings based primarily on graduation rate, matriculation rate for college and number of Advanced Placement / International Baccalaureate courses taken per student, with lesser factors based on average scores on the SAT / ACT, average AP/IB scores and the number of AP/IB courses available to students.

In its listing of "America's Best High Schools 2016", the school was ranked 40th out of 500 best high schools in the country; it was ranked 12th among all high schools in New Jersey and first among the state's non-magnet schools.

== Music and theater ==
=== Marching band ===
Chatham High has a 58-member marching band that competes in the Group 2 open classification. The band was ranked continuously in the top five bands in Group 2 Open and held an overall #1 ranking for several weeks in 2008. As of 2012, the band is now in Group 3 Open.

=== Theater ===
Chatham High School has an active theater program that performs two productions a school year, a play in the fall and then a musical in the Spring.

In past years the Theater Department has put on Macbeth, The Laramie Project, The Crucible, The Adding Machine, You Can't Take It with You, A Midsummer Night's Dream, Scapino, Our Town, Metamorphoses & Look Homeward, Angel. As for musicals the High School has presented Les Miserables, The Wizard of Oz, The Pajama Game, High School Musical, How to Succeed in Business Without Really Trying, Grease, Guys and Dolls, The Drowsy Chaperone, Legally Blonde, Anything Goes, Once Upon a Mattress, Shrek and The Addams Family Fiddler on the Roof and The Hunchback of Notre Dame.

== Athletics ==
The Chatham High School Cougars compete in the Northwest Jersey Athletic Conference, which is comprised of public and private high schools in Morris, Sussex and Warren counties, and was established following a reorganization of sports leagues in Northern New Jersey by the New Jersey State Interscholastic Athletic Association (NJSIAA). Prior to the NJSIAA's 2010 realignment, the school had competed as part of the Iron Hills Conference, comprised of public and private high schools in Essex County and Union County. With 979 students in grades 10–12, the school was classified by the NJSIAA for the 2019–20 school year as Group III for most athletic competition purposes, which included schools with an enrollment of 761 to 1,058 students in that grade range. The football team competes in the Patriot White division of the North Jersey Super Football Conference, which includes 112 schools competing in 20 divisions, making it the nation's biggest football-only high school sports league. The school was classified by the NJSIAA as Group IV North for football for 2024–2026, which included schools with 893 to 1,315 students.

The school participates in a joint wrestling team with Summit High School as the host school / lead agency. This co-op program operates under agreements scheduled to expire at the end of the 2023–24 school year.

The boys' tennis team won the Group I & II state championship in 1967 vs. Saddle Brook High School and in 1968 and 1969 vs. Mountain Lakes High School both years. The team won the Group II title in 2010 vs. Haddonfield Memorial High School. The 1967 team finished at 16-4 after beating Rutherford High School in the quarterfinals and Mountain Lakes High School in the semis, and then defeating Saddle Brook in the finals of the Group I/II tournament to win the state championship. The 2008 boys tennis team won the North II, Group II state sectional championship with a 4–1 win in the tournament final over Mountain Lakes High School. The 2010 team won the Group II title by 3–2 over Haddonfield before falling by 3–2 to Westfield High School in the finals of the Tournament of Champions at Mercer County Park; the team, which was the top-ranked team in the state by The Star-Ledger, finished the season with a 30–2 record.

The girls tennis team won the Group I state championship in 1976 (defeating runner-up Holmdel High School in the tournament's final round), 1977 (vs. Holmdel), 1979 (vs. Audubon High School), 1980 (vs. Bernards High School), 1981 (vs Glen Rock High School) and 1984 (vs. Bernards). The 1976 team finished the season with a 17–2 record after winning the Group I state title by defeating Holmdel 3–2 in the playoff finals.

The girls' field hockey team won the North II Group I state sectional championship in 1976-1980 and from 1983 to 1987. The team won the Group I state title in 1976 (as co-champion with South Hunterdon Regional High School), 1978 (vs. Woodstown High School), 1979 (vs. Eustace Preparatory School), 1980 (vs. Glassboro High School) and 1983 (co-champion with Pitman High School).

The football team won the North II Group I state sectional championship in 1984, defeating New Providence High School by a score of 20–14 in the tournament final.

The boys soccer team won the Group II state championship in 1988 (as co-champion with Delran High School), 1990 (vs. Ridge High School), 1993 (vs. Delran), 1998 (vs. Hopewell Valley Central High School), 1999 (vs. Freehold Borough High School) Including its predecessor schools (Chatham Borough and Chatham Township High Schools), the boys soccer team has won the state title 25 times, tied (with Kearny High School) for the most of any school in the state. The 2010 team advanced to the Group III state championship, where they fell to Holmdel High School by a score of 2–1.

The boys' basketball team won the 2007 Group II NJSIAA state championship, defeating Pascack Hills High School 67–53 in the semifinals and topping Haddonfield Memorial High School 48–42 in the finals.

The boys' tennis team won the North II, Group II state sectional championship with a 3–2 win over West Essex High School.

The boys' cross country team won the 2006 North II, Group II state sectional championship for the second time in three years and won again in 2008. Additionally, the team went on to win the 2006 Morris County Championship, topping both perennial powerhouses Morris Hills and Delbarton. In November 2013, the boys cross country team won the North II Group III sectional title by one point by beating their rivals and defending champion, Morristown. In 2014, The Cougars won the Morris County championship for the first time since 2006, captured the Northwest Jersey Athletic Conference Large-Schools team title for the first time ever, finished second at the NJSIAA North II Group III championships, third at the overall Group III meet and 13th at the Meet of Champions.

The girls' soccer team won the 2004 Group II NJSIAA state championship, defeating Cinnaminson High School in the finals in double overtime by a score of 1–0.

The 2007 girls' volleyball team won the triple crown, winning the conference, county and state championships, winning the Group II state championship with a come-from-behind win in three games against Northern Valley Regional High School at Demarest (11–25, 25–19, 25–22). They lost in the semifinals of the Tournament of Champions to Hunterdon Central Regional High School by 26–24 and 29–27.

The girls lacrosse team won the Group I state title in 2008 (defeating Shore Regional High School in the tournament final), won the Group II title in 2010 and 2011 (vs. Rumson-Fair Haven High School both years) and 2012 (vs. Red Bank Catholic High School) and won the Group III championship in 2022 (vs. Moorestown High School); The programs' five state group titles is ranked sixth in the state. The 2008 girls' lacrosse team won the triple crown by capturing the conference, county, and Group I state championships while being ranked the no. 3 team in the state. They lost 16–9 to powerhouse Moorestown High School in Chatham High School's first ever appearance in the Tournament of Champions final game.

The 2008 Chatham golf team completed a highly successful campaign by going undefeated at 21–0 for the year. The Cougars won the conference championship as well as the NJ Group II state championship. Chatham was named Golf Team of the Year by the Daily Record and was ranked fifth in the state of by The Star-Ledger by virtue of their overall finish at the Tournament of Champions event held at Beacon Hill Country Club in Atlantic Highlands.

The 2010–2011 Chatham hockey team won the Public B state championship with a 7–3 victory over Middletown High School South at the Prudential Center, the school's first state championship in the sport since the tournament system began in 1976. The 2012–13 team won the second hockey state title in three years for Chatham, scoring three goals in the third period to defeat Morristown High School by a score of 3–0 at the Prudential Center to take the Public B title.

The boys' lacrosse team won the Group II state championship in 2012 and 2013, defeating Somerville High School both years in the tournament final and in 2016 (vs. Manasquan High School), and won the Group III title in 2021 (vs. Ocean City High School).

The 2014 girls' swim team won its fourth consecutive Public B state title, finishing the season with a 15–0 record. On January 30, 2016, the girls' swim team won its 100th consecutive meet and the team's eight consecutive Morris County Championship. The team won the Public C title in 2015 and Public B in 2017; the team's six group titles is tied for sixth-most in the state.

The 2022 boys swim team defeated Princeton High School by a score of 97-73 in the finals to win the program's first-ever Public B state title and finish the season with a record of 16-0. The boys' team won the Morris County Championship the same season.

The boys' volleyball team was recognized in March 2023 by the NJSIAA as an official varsity team.

== Administration ==
The school's principal is Douglas M. Walker, who was appointed in April 2022. His core administration team includes two assistant principals and the athletic director.

== Notable alumni ==
- Ben Bailey (born 1970, class of 1988), host of Cash Cab
- Craig Benson (born 1954), Governor of New Hampshire from 2003 to 2005
- Lincoln Brower (1931–2018) was an American entomologist and ecologist, best known for his research on monarch butterflies
- Charles L. Drake (1924-1997), geologist who was Professor of Geology at Dartmouth College
- Peter Fleming (born 1955), former professional tennis player who won the New Jersey high school individual championship in 1972, during his junior year
- I. Kathleen Hagen (1945-2015, class of 1963), physician who was convicted of murdering her parents by asphyxiation in their Chatham Township home
- Don Herrmann (born 1947), wide receiver who played in the NFL for the New York Giants and New Orleans Saints
- Alex Laferriere (born 2001), professional ice hockey right winger for the Los Angeles Kings of the National Hockey League
- Constance Horner (born 1942, class of 1960), businesswoman who served as the third director of the United States Office of Personnel Management
- James G. Madison (born c. 1956, class of 1975), bank robber
- Patrick McHale (born 1983, class of 2002), creator of the animated television miniseries Over the Garden Wall
- Andrew Prendeville (born 1981, class of 2000), professional automobile racer
- Adi Roy (born 2002, Class of 2020), played Aladdin on Aladdin on broadway. He previously was in a production of Aladdin in middle school.
- John Rennie (born c. 1944), college soccer coach, who was a five-time ACC Coach of the Year and the 1982 NSCAA Coach of the Year
- Zach Ryan (born 1999, class of 2017), professional soccer player for New York Red Bulls in Major League Soccer
- Anne M. Thompson, scientist who specializes in atmospheric chemistry and climate change
- John Tolkin (born 2002), soccer player who plays as a defender for New York Red Bulls II in the USL Championship and the New York Red Bulls academy
- Billy Walsh (born 1975), U.S. Olympic and professional soccer player
- Alex Westlund (born 1975), retired professional ice hockey goaltender who has since been a coach
- Alexis Williams, activist and engineer
- David Williams (born 1967, attended 1981–1983, ultimately graduated from Choate-Rosemary Hall), ice hockey player for the San Jose Sharks and the Mighty Ducks of Anaheim
