= Holmdel High School =

High school in New Jersey, United States

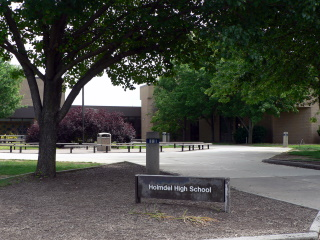

Location
- 36 Crawfords Corner Road; Holmdel Township, Monmouth County 07733; United States
- 40.380979°N 74.179382°W

Information
- Type: Public high school
- Established: September 1970 (building opened in September 1973)
- School district: Holmdel Township Public Schools
- NCES School ID: 340741003850
- Principal: Michael-John Herits
- Faculty: 89.2 FTEs
- Grades: 9-12
- Enrollment: 934 (as of 2024–25)
- Student to teacher ratio: 10.5:1
- Colors: Royal Blue; Silver; White
- Athletics conference: Shore Conference
- Team name: Hornets
- Accreditation: Middle States Association of Colleges and Schools
- Newspaper: The Sting
- Yearbook: Creation
- Website: hhs.holmdelschools.org

Holmdel High School is a comprehensive community four-year public high school serving students in ninth through twelfth grades from Holmdel Township, in Monmouth County, in the U.S. state of New Jersey, operating as the lone secondary school in the Holmdel Township Public Schools. The school has been accredited by the Middle States Association of Colleges and Schools Commission on Elementary and Secondary Schools since 1977.

As of the 2024–25 school year, the school had an enrollment of 934 students and 89.2 classroom teachers (on an FTE basis), for a student–teacher ratio of 10.5:1. There were 20 students (2.1% of enrollment) eligible for free lunch and 6 (0.6% of students) eligible for reduced-cost lunch.

Holmdel sports teams, notably the field hockey and boys tennis teams have been New Jersey State Interscholastic Athletic Association (NJSIAA) state champions.

== History ==
Until 1962, the district had sent students in grades nine to twelve to Keyport High School as part of a sending/receiving relationship. The district started sending students to Red Bank High School in 1962 and then Red Bank Regional High School when that district was established in 1969, which ended when the district opened Holmdel High School.

The high school opened in September 1970 with a ninth grade that was housed in a middle school building that had been constructed two years earlier. While less than 60% of graduating eighth-graders in 1969 moved on to Red Bank High School, nearly all of the students who completed eighth grade in Holmdel in 1970 moved on to attend the new high school.

The high school was constructed at a cost of $8.2 million (equivalent to $59.5 million in 2025) and a design capacity of 965 students, with a building that featured many large roof spans above open spaces and unusually shaped rooms that added substantially to the cost above those of other facilities constructed at the same time for comparable numbers of students. Ground was broken for the new facility in September 1971 and the first group of 701 students started attending the school two years later, in September 1973.

== Awards, recognition and rankings ==
In its listing of "America's Best High Schools 2016," the school was ranked 91st out of 500 best high schools in the country; it was ranked 19th among all high schools in New Jersey and sixth among the state's non-magnet schools. In Newsweek's annual list of the top public high schools in America for 2015, Holmdel High School ranked at number 41 in the nation, the 13th-highest in New Jersey and the third-ranked of the state's non-selective high schools.

In its 2013 report on "America's Best High Schools," The Daily Beast ranked the school 244th in the nation among participating public high schools and 19th among schools in New Jersey. The school was ranked 179th in the nation and 13th in New Jersey on the list of "America's Best High Schools 2012" prepared by The Daily Beast / Newsweek, with rankings based primarily on graduation rate, matriculation rate for college and number of Advanced Placement / International Baccalaureate courses taken per student, with lesser factors based on average scores on the SAT / ACT, average AP/IB scores and the number of AP/IB courses available to students.

In the 2011 "Ranking America's High Schools" issue by The Washington Post, the school was ranked 20th in New Jersey and 735th nationwide. In Newsweek's May 22, 2007, issue, ranking the country's top high schools, Holmdel High School was listed in 480th place, the ninth-highest ranked school in New Jersey. The school was ranked as the 45th-best public secondary school in New Jersey and the 380th-best in the U.S. in Newsweek magazine's listing of "America's Best High Schools" in 2006 and was ranked 426th in the 2005 rankings.

The school was the 12th-ranked public high school in New Jersey out of 339 schools statewide in New Jersey Monthly magazine's September 2014 cover story on the state's "Top Public High Schools", using a new ranking methodology. The school had been ranked 13th in the state of 328 schools in 2012, after being ranked 17th in 2010 out of 322 schools listed. The magazine ranked the school 11th in 2008 out of 316 schools. Schooldigger.com ranked the school 38th out of 381 public high schools statewide in its 2011 rankings (an increase of 1 position from the 2010 ranking) which were based on the combined percentage of students classified as proficient or above proficient on the mathematics (94.3%) and language arts literacy (97.2%) components of the High School Proficiency Assessment (HSPA).

The chess team competes with other schools in the Shore Chess League of New Jersey (SCLNJ). The chess team won the 2005 New Jersey High School Booster Championship, and in 2006 won the New Jersey High School Varsity Championship.

Holmdel High School is home to Baseball Primetime, a regional cable television show that won the 2005 New York-area National Television High School Award for Excellence in the Sports category.

The American Computer Science League 2005–06 competition was held May 27, 2006, at Lakota East High School, with the Holmdel High School team placing third in the three-member team competition.

== Campus ==
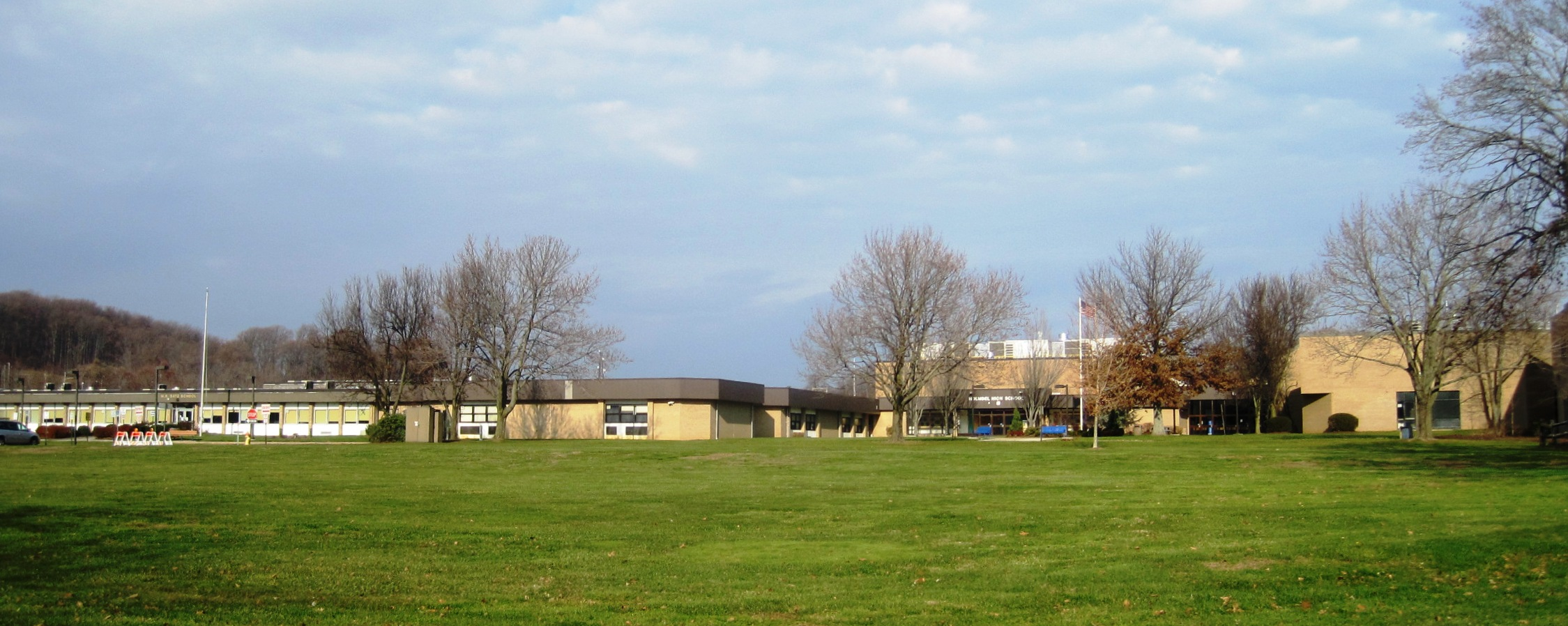
Front of the school as seen from Crawfords Corner Road

Holmdel High School is physically connected to the William R. Satz Middle School and is notable for its unusual hexagonal architecture. The oldest part of the building structure is the English/Humanities Hallway, with classroom numbers running in the 100s. The main part was completed in 1973, including the Commons, the 400s, the 500s, the Library, the Gym, the Complex Auditorium, and the TV Studio. The 400s (and 500s on the second floor) are eccentrically designed in a circular fashion, with both ends reaching the Commons. They surround the Library and Conference area. In addition to classrooms, the 400s wing also houses the Humanities Department Office, The Sting newspaper office, and Creation yearbook office.

The Commons is the main meeting area of the school, with lunch, school events, and many after-school activities taking place there. Within the Commons is the Chartwells Lunch Service, where students buy food. The Commons is also a main advertising area for school events, such as club fundraisers, activities, sports events, and annual functions like Powderpuff and Spirit Week. The Complex Auditorium features state-of-the-art sound systems and hosts a multitude of events, ranging from the Holmdel Theater Guild annual productions to Holmdel Board of Education meetings. The large gym hosts basketball games and daily physical education classes. The TV studio hosts classes and TV production after school. The Library consists of several thousand volumes, and also contains nearly 40 desktop computers for student use. In 2000, construction of a new 600s/700s wing was completed, bringing new science facilities to the school. In 2004, construction of a new 800s/900s wing was completed, hosting both language and science classrooms. A new multipurpose gymnasium/cafeteria and the adjacent kitchen were constructed in 2004. However, the gymnasium's length is three feet short of the minimum that is required to host varsity basketball games and the kitchen has never been used because it was constructed without the proper ventilation systems. The Board of the Holmdel was disappointed with the implications of the construction error. States former president Mark Mawerds, "The carelessness that took place has resulted in a space that is not functional. The next rebuild will be done by professionals only."

Because of the open space Holmdel houses, the several dozen acres behind the school contain soccer, baseball, softball, field hockey, lacrosse, football, tennis, and track sports areas. The combination football/track field is known as Bob Roggy Field, named after the Holmdel alumnus who set the world javelin record. It was renovated as part of a project that began in 2006, which included the construction of a new six-lane track and a synthetic turf to replace the existing grass field.

On Holmdel High School grounds is the Duncan Smith Theater, named after a Holmdel alumnus, in which Holmdel Theater Company and Holmdel Theater Guild productions are regularly performed.

== Extracurricular activities ==
The students of Holmdel participate in a variety of activities, ranging from sports to academic clubs to artistic organizations on campus. The largest sport is track, and the largest extracurricular club is the Kiwanis Key Club. Other clubs include Best Buddies, Future Business Leaders of America, Creation yearbook, The Sting newspaper, Eco Club, SPCA Club, Transitions, Model U.N, Operation Smile, Heroes and Cool Kids, and C.O.I.N . Holmdel also has a National Honors Society chapter.

The Holmdel High School TV Society finished its second season of The Hornet Report, a news show about Holmdel High School and the local community. The Hornet Report won a 2011 Telly Award. The TV Society also won the 2011 NJM BIANJ Award for its public service announcement, "Don't Press Send Until Your Ride Ends".

The Holmdel Theatre Guild is Holmdel High School's resident theatre production company. Each year, it hosts three major productions, including a fall drama, winter musical, and a one-act play festival in the spring.

The Holmdel mascot is the Hornet. During the American Revolutionary War the British named this area the Hornet's Nest because the sting from the town's fighting patriots meant frequent defeat to the British raiders.

The Student Advisory Board is the main student governing body of the school. It is responsible for approving/denying fundraisers, dealing with club and organization issues, and serving as a liaison between the administration and the student body. The Student Council, on the other hand, deals with issues specific to each grade. The Student Council of the Holmdel High School is a separate entity from the Student Advisory Board. The Student Council consists of class officers, e.g. Freshman President, Vice-President, Secretary, Treasurer, and two S.A.B. representatives.

The band program offered in Holmdel High School has won numerous awards from various festivals and ranked competitions. The band program in Holmdel High School consists of a symphonic band and a jazz ensemble. The jazz band is audition-only and travels to numerous competitions in the tri-state area every year. Many students from the band program successfully audition for various honors ensembles, including the All Shore Jazz and Symphonic Bands and CJMEA Region Bands.

== Athletics ==
The Holmdel High School Hornets compete in Division A Central of the Shore Conference, an athletic conference comprised of public and private high schools in Monmouth and Ocean counties along the Jersey Shore. The league operates under the jurisdiction of the New Jersey State Interscholastic Athletic Association (NJSIAA). With 712 students in grades 10-12, the school was classified by the NJSIAA for the 2019–20 school year as Group II for most athletic competition purposes, which included schools with an enrollment of 486 to 758 students in that grade range. The school was classified by the NJSIAA as Group III South for football for 2024–2026, which included schools with 695 to 882 students.

The school participates in a joint ice hockey team with Marlboro High School as the host school / lead agency. The co-op program operates under agreements scheduled to expire at the end of the 2023–24 school year.

The girls' tennis team has won the Group I title in 1978 (defeating Chatham Township High School in the finals), Group II in 1999 (vs. Chatham High School), 2014 (vs. Summit High School), 2015 (vs. Ramapo High School), 2016 (vs. Haddonfield Memorial High School), 2017 (vs. Haddonfield) and 2018 (vs. Northern Valley Regional High School at Demarest) and won in Group III in 2005 (vs. Wall High School); the program's seven state titles are tied for tenth-most in the state. Holmdel won the Tournament of Champions in 2005 against runner-up Westfield High School. The 1978 team won the Group I state title in the tournament final at Princeton University with a 4-1 win against a Chatham Township team that beat Holmdel 4-1 the previous year. The 1999 team won against Pascack Hills High School 4-1 in the semis and defeated Chatham 3-2 in the tournament finals at Mercer County Park. The team won the program's fifth consecutive Group II title with a 3-2 win in 2018 against Northern Valley at Demarest.

The girls cross country team won the Group II state championship from 1982 to 1984 and 2019.

The boys' tennis team won the Group II state championship in 1983 (against runner-up Tenafly High School), 1984 (vs. Moorestown High School), 2002 (vs. Moorestown), 2012 (vs. Haddonfield Memorial High School), 2013 (vs. Bernards High School), 2015 (vs. Summit High School), 2016 (vs. West Essex High School), 2017 (vs. Northern Valley Regional High School at Demarest) and 2018 (vs. Haddonfield Memorial High School). The program's nine state titles are tied for tenth-most in the state. The team won the 2002 Tournament of Champions with a 3-2 win against Dwight-Englewood School. A 5-0 win against Northern Valley Demarest in 2017 earned the team their third straight Group II title. The 2018 team won the program's fourth consecutive Group II title with a 4-1 win against Haddonfield in the finals at Mercer County Park.

The boys cross country team won the Group II state championship in 1994, 1995, 2001, 2011 and 2012.

In 1998 and 1999, the boys' basketball team won back-to-back Group II state championships by defeating West Morris Mendham High School both seasons. The 1998 team won the program's first state title with a 67-52 against West Morris Mendham in the Group II championship game. The team won its second consecutive Group II title in 1999 with a 55-51 win against West Morris Mendham in the tournament final at the Atlantic City Convention Hall. The 1999 team went on to defeat Parsippany High School in the quarterfinals of the Tournament of Champions by a score of 77-55 before falling to eventual ToC champion Seton Hall Preparatory School by a score of 63–42 in the semifinals.

In 2001, the baseball team won the NJSIAA Central Jersey Group II state sectional championship, beating Spotswood High School by a score of 7–1.

The field hockey team won the Central Jersey Group II state sectional title in 2007 and the North II Group III title in 2008. In 2007, the field hockey team won the Central Jersey Group II sectional championship with a 2–1 win over Allentown High School in the tournament final.

The boys' soccer team won the Group III state championship in 2010 (defeating Chatham High School in the tournament final), and won the Group II title in 2017 (vs. Dover High School) and 2018 (vs. Glen Rock High School). In 2006, the boys' soccer team won the North II Group III state sectional championship, beating Voorhees High School 4–2, before losing in the Group III state championship game by a score of 3–0 to Ramapo High School. In 2010, the team finished the season with a 22-1 record, having won the Group III title, the program's first, with a 2–1 win over Chatham in the championship game. The victory was the first and only Group III championship won by Holmdel in any sport. The 2017 team finished the season with a 21-1-1 record after winning the program's first championship in the Shore Conference Tournament title with a 7-1 win against Ocean Township High School in the finals and taking the Group II title with a 4-1 win against Dover in the championship game played at Kean University. The 2018 team won the program's third state title and second in two years after a 3-1 win against Glen Rock in the Group II finals, to finish the season 22-0-1.

Holmdel girls' soccer varsity won the NJSIAA Group II state championship in 2014, the program's first, with a 1–0 victory in the tournament final against Ramapo High School.

== Controversy ==
While attending an off-site pre-season football training camp in the summer of 1989 at Camp Green Lane located in Pennsylvania, senior members of the Holmdel Hornets Football team were alleged to have committed acts of "hazing," forcing underclassmen (mostly sophomores) to remove their clothing and play a game of Twister. The event was videotaped. The Record of November 12, 1989, is quoted as stating that "some coaches reportedly were disciplined." The incident also appeared on an episode of A Current Affair, a news tabloid show on WNYW, Fox Television, in 1989. As a result of the incident, all of the school's 85 football players reportedly were ordered to undergo mental health counseling. In 1991, the sophomores who had been hazed (then seniors) went 9-2 and were the runner up for the Central Jersey Group II state sectional title.

In 1997, Holmdel High School had an additional incident of hazing in the news, related to the soccer team. More than 200 people attended a Board of Education meeting after hazing reports surfaced. Many were angry that someone had complained about hazing. "Soccer is not a sport of the timid," a mother told the board, according to the Asbury Park Press.

In September 2005, a lawsuit was filed against the Holmdel Board of Education on behalf of a lesbian student claiming that she had been abused and assaulted by fellow students, including an incident where she injured her ankle after being pushed down a stairway.

In Fall 2005, six-year head football coach Joe O'Connor stepped down in protest against the school administration's reinstatement of a player he had dismissed from the team. In a show of support for O'Connor's stand, all nine assistant football coaches resigned as well.

In October 2013, Laurie Cancalosi, an openly gay physical education teacher at Holmdel, was awarded $800,000 in a wrongful termination lawsuit that also alleged that the district had created a hostile work environment.

In May 2018, Kenilworth Public Schools superintendent Thomas Tramaglini was charged for lewdness, littering, and public defecation after being caught defecating on the Holmdel High School track after police and school officials found human feces near the bleachers "daily".

In January 2024, superintendent J. Scott Cascone had described Teaching While Muslim, a website about Muslim heritage that had been used in the district as a resource for Muslim Heritage Month, as including material that was "biased and antisemitic", after community members had raised concerns about political content on the site related to Palestine, Sudan and Israel. The director of the organization behind Teaching While Muslim criticized the superintendent's response, saying that labeling the content as antisemitic was a way of silencing the organization and preventing inclusivity in education.

== Administration ==
The school's principal is Michael-John Herits. His administration team includes the assistant principal.

== Notable alumni ==
- John Burke (born 1971), former professional football player who played in the NFL for the New England Patriots, New York Jets and San Diego Chargers
- Johnny Cannizzaro (class of 2001), stage, film and television actor and writer who appeared in the film Jersey Boys
- John Cannon (born 1960), former defensive end who played nine seasons for the Tampa Bay Buccaneers
- Sean Davis (born 1993), professional soccer player for the New York Red Bulls of Major League Soccer
- Christopher Dell (born 1956, class of 1974), diplomat who served as the United States Ambassador to Kosovo, Angola and Zimbabwe
- Brian Hanlon, sculptor
- Jodi Kantor (born 1975, class of 1992), reporter for The New York Times and author of The Obamas
- Quenton Nelson (born 1996), offensive guard who has played in the NFL for the Indianapolis Colts
- Michael V. Pomarico (born 1955, class of 1974), six-time Emmy Award Winner who was a member of the school's first graduating class and produced the 2006 documentary Coming Home Again - An Evening With Dr. Richard White about the school's history
- Bob Roggy (1956–1986, class of 1974), who set the American javelin throw record in the early 1980s, whose javelin is on display in the front entrance hall of Holmdel HS, and after whom the Holmdel HS football field and track is named
- Lorene Scafaria (born 1978, class of 1995), actress and writer of several screenplays of films including Seeking a Friend for the End of the World starring Steve Carell and Keira Knightley
