= John Burke (American football) =

American football player (born 1971)

No. 85, 83
- Position: Tight end

Personal information
- Born: September 7, 1971 (age 55); Elizabeth, New Jersey, U.S.
- Listed height: 6 ft 3 in (1.91 m)
- Listed weight: 248 lb (112 kg)

Career information
- High school: Holmdel (Holmdel Township, New Jersey)
- College: Virginia Tech
- NFL draft: 1994: 4th round, 121st overall pick

Career history
- New England Patriots (1994–1996); New York Jets (1997); San Diego Chargers (1998); New York Jets (1999)*; Oakland Raiders (2000)*
- * Offseason or practice squad member only

Career NFL statistics
- Receptions: 28
- Receiving yards: 273
- Receiving TDs: 0
- Stats at Pro Football Reference

John Richard Burke (born September 7, 1971) is an American former professional football player who was a tight end in the National Football League (NFL) for the New England Patriots, New York Jets and San Diego Chargers. He played college football for the Virginia Tech Hokies and was selected by the Patriots in the fourth round of the 1994 NFL draft with the 121st overall pick.

Burke grew up in Holmdel Township, New Jersey, and attended Holmdel High School.
