= Chatham Day School =

Private school in New Jersey, United States

Location
- 700 Shunpike Road; Chatham, NJ 07928; 40.74924°N 74.434905°W

Information
- Type: Private school
- Established: 1998
- Head of school: David Buffum
- Faculty: 50 (on FTE basis)
- Grades: PreK–8
- Enrollment: 172 (in PK–8, as of 2014-15)
- Student to teacher ratio: 4:1
- Website: school website

Chatham Day School is an independent coeducational day school located in Chatham Township, New Jersey, United States, serving students in preschool through grade eight. Chatham Day School opened its doors in 1998, and is small by design. Class sizes are maintained at a maximum of 14 per class with a 4:1 student teacher ratio.

As of the 2014–15 school year, the school had an enrollment of 172 students in grades K–8.

The Chatham Day School is a member of NAIS, and is accredited by the Middle States Association of Colleges and Schools and the New Jersey Association of Independent Schools.
