= Rolling Knolls Landfill =

Coordinates: 40.7176°N 74.4210°W

- Superfund site
- Location within Morris County, New Jersey
- Location: Chatham Township, Morris County, New Jersey

Information
- CERCLIS ID: NJD980505192
- Contaminants: Arsenic, lead, mercury, polycyclic aromatic hydrocarbons (PAHs), pesticides, phthalates, polychlorinated biphenyls (PCBs), volatile organic compounds (VOCs), semi-volatile organic compounds (SVOCs), freon compounds, dioxin and furans
- Responsible parties: Private and public ownership: various responsible parties

Progress
- Proposed: April 30, 2003
- Listed: September 29, 2003

The Rolling Knolls Landfill is a 170 acre landfill and Superfund site located in the Green Village section of Chatham Township in New Jersey. It is bordered on two sides by the Great Swamp National Wildlife Refuge, and was formerly known as Miele's Dump, after owner Robert Miele. It is currently primarily owned by the Miele family trust.

== Background ==
The Landfill is notable for being identified by the Environmental Protection Agency as a Superfund site. It was operated as a municipal landfill from the early 1930s until December 1968, during which time it handled municipal solid waste, as well as construction and demolition debris from neighboring communities.

"According to the EPA's Web site, soil samples collected in 1999 showed levels of metals, phthalates, and polychlorinated biphenyls (PCBs) that were above regulation norms.

Mercury and PCB releases were also observed in a surface water and sediment sample taken from a portion of the landfill located within the Great Swamp Wildlife Refuge, according to the EPA. Testing also showed "actual contamination of a terrestrial sensitive environment," and indicated potential exposure of nearby residents, the EPA says.

== Cleanup ==
As of 2022, the EPA has submitted plans for remediation, but no cleanup has started at the site. In 2026, a member of the Miele family expressed interest in developing the site, despite cleanup costs potentially reaching tens of millions of dollars.

== See also ==
- Landfill in the United States
