= Holmdel Township Public Schools =

School district in Monmouth County, New Jersey, US

Address
- 65 McCampbell Road Holmdel Township, Monmouth County, New Jersey, 07733; United States

District information
- Grades: PreK-12
- Superintendent: Scott Cascone
- Business administrator: Deborah Donnelly
- Schools: 4

Students and staff
- Enrollment: 2,891 (as of 2023–24)
- Faculty: 285.14 FTEs
- Student–teacher ratio: 10.14:1

Other information
- District Factor Group: I
- Website: www.holmdelschools.org
Ind.	Per pupil	District spending	Rank (*)	K-12 average	%± vs. average
1A	Total Spending	$20,190	59	$18,891	6.9%
1	Budgetary Cost	15,736	57	14,783	6.4%
2	Classroom Instruction	8,829	54	8,763	0.8%
6	Support Services	3,064	62	2,392	28.1%
8	Administrative Cost	1,232	5	1,485	−17.0%
10	Operations & Maintenance	2,313	65	1,783	29.7%
13	Extracurricular Activities	290	10	268	8.2%
16	Median Teacher Salary	72,790	64	64,043
Data from NJDoE 2014 Taxpayers' Guide to Education Spending. *Of K-12 districts with 1,800-3,500 students. Lowest spending=1; Highest=68

The Holmdel Township Public Schools is a comprehensive community public school district that serves students in pre-kindergarten through twelfth grade from Holmdel Township, in Monmouth County, in the U.S. state of New Jersey.

As of the 2023–24 school year, the district, comprised of four schools, had an enrollment of 2,891 students and 285.14 classroom teachers (on an FTE basis), for a student–teacher ratio of 10.14:1.

== History ==
Until 1962, the district had sent students in grades nine to twelve to Keyport High School as part of a sending/receiving relationship. The district started sending students to Red Bank High School in 1962, which ended when the district opened Holmdel High School in September 1973.

The district had been classified by the New Jersey Department of Education as being in District Factor Group "I", the second-highest of eight groupings. District Factor Groups organize districts statewide to allow comparison by common socioeconomic characteristics of the local districts. From lowest socioeconomic status to highest, the categories are A, B, CD, DE, FG, GH, I and J.

== Schools ==
Schools in the district (with 2023–24 enrollment data from the National Center for Education Statistics) are:

Elementary schools

- Village Elementary School with 805 students in grades PreK–3
  - Tricia Barrett, principal
- Indian Hill School with 623 students in grades 4–6
  - Lisa Vitale, principal

Middle school

- William R. Satz Middle School with 493 students in grades 7–8
  - Chantal M. Simonelli, principal

High school

- Holmdel High School with 960 students in grades 9–12
  - Michael-John Herits, principal

== Administration ==
Core members of the district's administration as of the 2024–25 school year are:

- Dr. J. Scott Cascone, Superintendent
- Deborah Donnelly, Business Administrator and Board Secretary

== Board of education ==
The district's board of education, comprised of nine members, sets policy and oversees the fiscal and educational operation of the district through its administration. As a Type II school district, the board's trustees are elected directly by voters to serve three-year terms of office on a staggered basis, with three seats up for election each year held (since 2012) as part of the November general election. The board appoints a superintendent to oversee the district's day-to-day operations and a business administrator to supervise the business functions of the district.
