= Mount Vernon School (Chatham Township, New Jersey) =

- U.S. National Register of Historic Places
- New Jersey Register of Historic Places
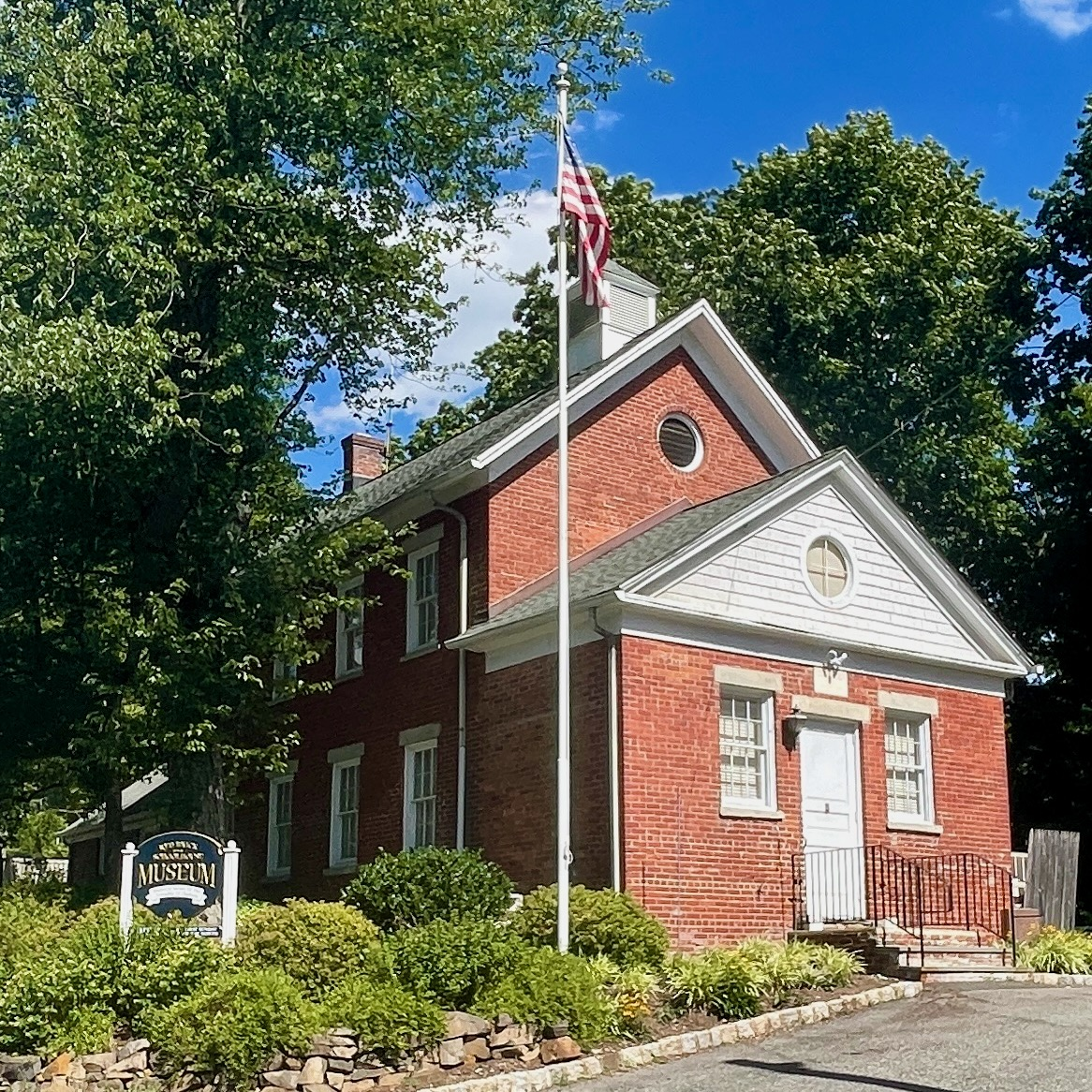

- Location within Morris County, New Jersey Location within New Jersey Location within the United States
- Location: 24 Southern Boulevard; Chatham Township, New Jersey
- Coordinates: 40°43′19″N 74°24′13″W
- Built: 1860
- Architectural style: Vernacular Classical Revival
- NRHP reference No.: 100007872
- NJRHP No.: 5694

Significant dates
- Added to NRHP: July 7, 2022
- Designated NJRHP: May 18, 2022

The Mount Vernon School, also known as the Chatham Red Brick Schoolhouse, is a historic school building located at 24 Southern Boulevard in the Long Hill section of Chatham Township in Morris County, New Jersey. It was added to the National Register of Historic Places on July 7, 2022, for its significance in education, politics/government, and social history from 1860 to 1970.

== History and description ==
The two-story brick schoolhouse was built in 1860 to serve the Mount Vernon Washington School District No. 7. The first floor was for education and the second floor for Sunday school and church services. In 1929, the school was closed after the new Southern Boulevard School opened. In 1930, it was purchased by Elliott and Martha Averett and used as a community center. In 1956, they deeded it back to the township. After renovations, the township used it as the Chatham Township Hall from 1958 to 1988. The Chatham Township Historical Society has used it as a local history museum since 1991.

== See also ==
- National Register of Historic Places listings in Morris County, New Jersey
- List of museums in New Jersey
