= Alexis Williams =

American activist and engineer

- Born: Chatham, New Jersey
- Education: New York University
- Occupations: Engineer, activist
- Known for: Sustainable fashion

Alexis Williams is an American activist, engineer, and advocate for sustainable fashion. She founded the brand Softwear by Lex which uses recycled technology waste to create clothing.

== Biography ==
Williams grew up in Chatham, New Jersey, and graduated from Chatham High School. She was first introduced to computer programming through Kode with Klossy, a program started by supermodel Karlie Kloss to help young women learn computer science skills. One of her first projects involved controlling prosthetic fingers and she won an award at a 2019 hackathon event. She also cites the 2017 film Hidden Figures as providing additional inspiration to get into coding. Williams enrolled in the New York University Tandon School of Engineering in 2019.

In response to the murder of George Floyd in May 2020, Williams launched a website called PBR; initially standing for Police Brutality Resources, its goal was to provide "the Black community with the necessary social justice tools to fight against discrimination". Later renamed to Progress Building Resources, the website offered social organization and educational tools and explains how to help out efforts such as Black Lives Matter.

Williams founded the sustainable fashion brand Softwear by Lex in 2023. In 2026, DoSomething recognized Williams as one of its "9 Black STEM Trailblazers Breaking Barriers and Inspiring Innovation" for her combining computer science, activism, and sustainable fashion. She uses recycled technology to create clothing that "blends masculine and feminine aesthetics", citing how both fashion and technology are major contributors to climate change. Williams won Best Senior Project from her NYU STEM program for her work in creating the program. She graduated from NYU in 2023.

Williams has talked about her struggle with impostor syndrome, acknowledging it can be common for women in a STEM field. She cites the positive response to her PBR website as encouraging her own activism and has called for more Black girls to learn coding skills: "I have found that activism starts with speaking out about things you experience in your own life. Tell your story, and people will start to listen. It is also really important to reach people in other ways as well." In 2025, Alexis Williams worked with Aidan Kohn-Murphy to help organize Creators for Zohran, a group of online creators who supported Zohran Mamdani during his campaign for mayor of New York City.
