= Mad Hatter (bank robber) =

American bank robber

James G. Madison (born 1956/57), known popularly as the Mad Hatter, is a convicted American criminal. He robbed 17 banks of $81,000, each time wearing a different hat. His hats included a hunting cap, a knit ski cap, a St. Louis Cardinals cap and a Texas Longhorns cap.

Madison graduated from Chatham High School in 1975.

A machinist from Maplewood, New Jersey, Madison previously spent 18 years in state prison after murdering a friend and dumping her body in the Passaic River. He was paroled in 2003.

On July 17, 2007, after robbing the Bank of America in Union Township, New Jersey, Madison was arrested in Newark, New Jersey after police tracked his car license plates. On September 11, 2007, Madison pleaded guilty to six counts of bank robbery.
