= Chatham Township High School =

Defunct high school in Morris County, New Jersey, US

Coordinates: 40.7315°N 74.4006°W

Chatham Township High School (CTHS) was a public high school that existed from 1962 through 1988, located on Lafayette Avenue in Chatham Township, in Morris County, in the U.S. state of New Jersey. CTHS had as its mascot the Gladiator. The school became defunct when the township and Chatham Borough merged their independent school systems to create the School District of the Chathams. The current Chatham High School shared by both municipalities occupies the building that had been used by Chatham Township High School.

Voters in Chatham Township approved the building of a high school in September 1960, with a referendum to spend $1,750,000 in a bond offering passing by a 4–1 margin and completion expected in time for the 1962–63 school year.

The school, which opened to students in September 1962 for grades seven through nine under the supervision of principal Benjamin Diest, was formally dedicated in December of that year.

== Athletics ==
The school's sports teams were known as the Gladiators.

The baseball team won the North II Group I state sectional championship in 1966.

The ice hockey team won the Gordon Cup in 1972 and the Mennen Cup in 1976-1979 and 1981. After losing to Brick Township High School in an earlier round of the double-elimination tournament, the 1976 team made it to the finals and defeated Brick Township 6–2 to win the Gordon Cup.

The field hockey team won the North II Group I state sectional title in 1976–1980, 1983, 1986 and 1987; the team won the Group I state title in 1976 (as co-champion with South Hunterdon Regional High School), 1978 (vs. Woodstown High School), 1979 (vs. Eustace Preparatory School), 1980 (vs. Glassboro High School) and 1983 (as co-champion with Pitman High School). The five state championships won still rank as the ninth-most of any school in the state. The 1976 team finished the season with a 14-3-4 record after being declared as the Group I co-champion following a scoreless tie after two overtime periods in the title game against South Hunterdon; after flipping a coin, South Hunterdon obtained custody of the trophy for half the year while the trophy would be displayed at Chatham Township for the second half. After giving up the first goal of the game, the 1978 team took control and won the Group I title with a 3–1 win against Woodstown in the championship game.

The boys' soccer team won the Group I state championship in 1977 (vs. Jamesburg High School), 1983 (vs. Montgomery High School) and 1987 (vs. Haddonfield Memorial High School).

The boys' cross country team won the Group I state championship in 1977.

== Notable alumni ==
- Glenn Davis, sportscaster best known as the lead play-by-play announcer for local TV broadcasts of the Houston Dynamo FC
- Dave Given (born 1954), former ice hockey right winger who played one game in the World Hockey Association for the Vancouver Blazers.
- Anne M. Thompson, scientist, who specializes in atmospheric chemistry and climate change.
