= Anne M. Thompson =

American climate scientist

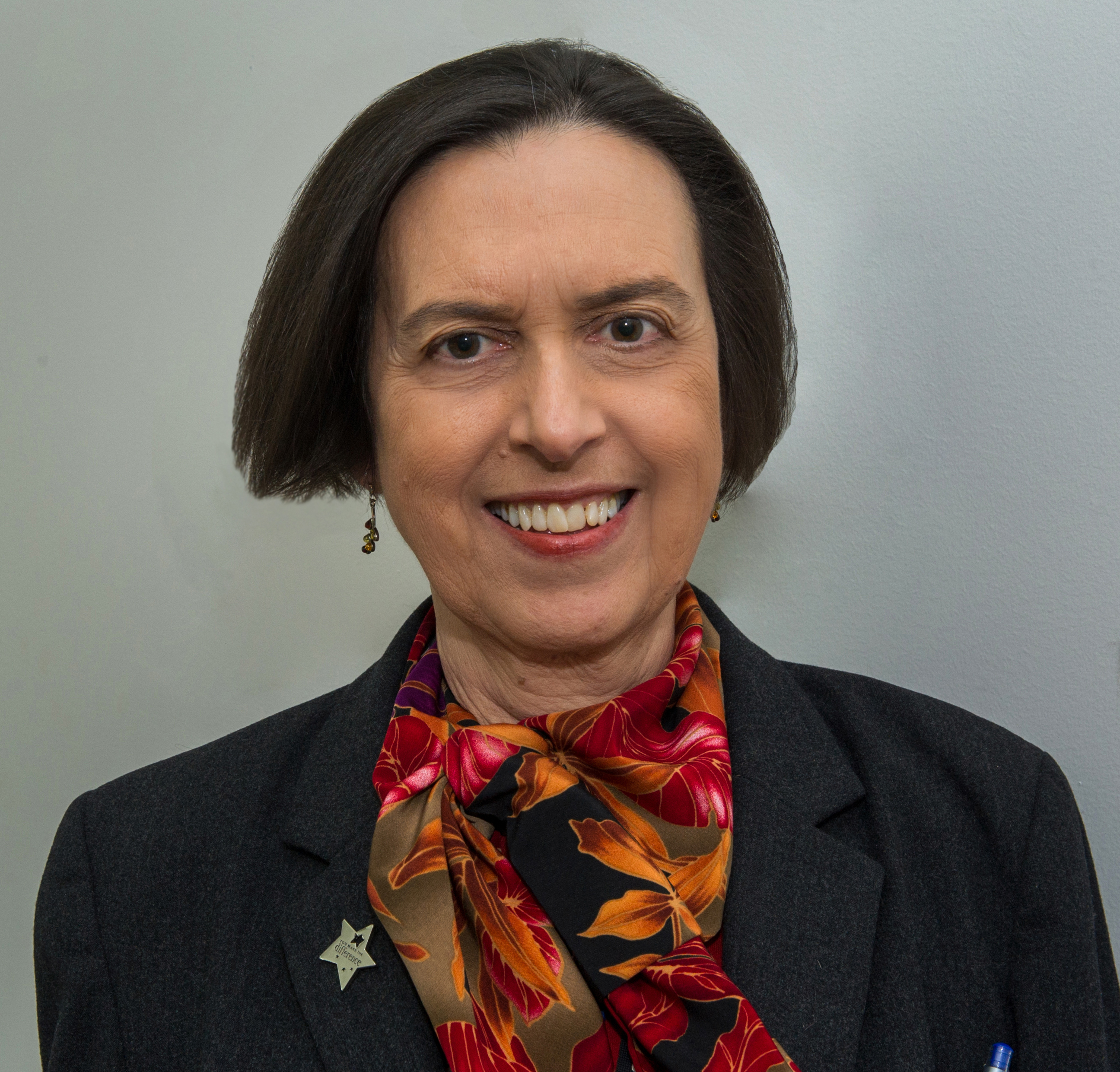
- Education: Ph.D. Bryn Mawr College M.S. Princeton University B.A. Swarthmore College
- Known for: oxidation capacity of atmosphere, ozone dynamics
- Awards: Fellow, American Meteorological Society Fellow, American Geophysical Union Fellow, AAAS NASA Senior Goddard Fellow Verner Suomi Award Roger Revelle Medal William Norberg Memorial Award for Earth Sciences
- Scientific career
- Workplaces: NASA, Atmospheric Chemistry Dynamics Lab

Anne Mee Thompson is an American scientist, who specializes in atmospheric chemistry and climate change. Her work focuses on how human activities have changed the chemistry of the atmosphere, climate forcing, and the Earth's oxidizing capacity. Thompson is an elected fellow of the American Meteorological Society, American Geophysical Union, and AAAS.

== Early life and education ==
Thompson was born in Pennsylvania, but spent most of her youth growing up in New Jersey and New York State. She grew up in Chatham Township, New Jersey and graduated from Chatham Township High School. Thompson received her bachelor's degree in chemistry, with honors, from Swarthmore College in 1970. She received her master's degree in chemistry from Princeton University in 1972 and then went on to get her Ph.D. in Physical Chemistry from Bryn Mawr College in 1978. She did postdoctoral research at Woods Hole Oceanographic Institution, then at UC San Diego with the Scripps Institution of Oceanography, and at the National Center for Atmospheric Research (NCAR), in Boulder, CO. During her postdoctoral work, Thompson's research focus shifted from physical chemistry to atmospheric chemistry, with influence from Ollie Zafiriou and Ralph Cicerone.

== Career ==
Thompson has worked as a Physical Scientist for NASA from 1986 to 2004, and she returned in 2013 and is now part of the Atmospheric Chemistry Dynamics group. In 1990, Thompson was on the Third Soviet-American Gas and Aerosols cruise which explored air-sea gas exchange and trace gases in remote marine areas. Thompson was co-mission scientist for NASA's 1997 DC-8 SINEX (SASS Ozone and Nitrogen Oxides Experiment) and PI for SHADOZ (Southern Hemisphere Additional Ozonesondes) which used airborne instruments such as weather balloons carrying ozonesonde packages to measure humidity, temperature and other atmospheric factors. Thompson has also conducted studies with fellow NASA scientist Bob Chatfield, to identify a wind current carrying human made pollution from Asia westward, creating areas of unusually high ozone levers far away from the true causes, these studies also use satellite and weather balloon data.

As of 2022, Thompson is an emeritus scientist at NASA and an adjunct professor of meteorology at Penn State University.

== Selected publications ==
- Thompson, Anne M. (1992-05-22). "The Oxidizing Capacity of the Earth's Atmosphere: Probable Past and Future Changes". Science. 256 (5060): 1157–1165. Bibcode:1992Sci...256.1157T. doi:10.1126/science.256.5060.1157. hdl:11603/35040. PMID 1317061. S2CID 27360206.
- Chin, Mian; Rood, Richard B.; Lin, Shian-Jiann; Müller, Jean-Francois; Thompson, Anne M. (2000-10-01). "Atmospheric sulfur cycle simulated in the global model GOCART: Model description and global properties". Journal of Geophysical Research: Atmospheres. 105 (D20): 24671–24687. Bibcode:2000JGR...10524671C. doi:10.1029/2000jd900384. hdl:11603/34946. ISSN 0148-0227.
- Thompson, Anne M. (2003). "Southern Hemisphere Additional Ozonesondes (SHADOZ) 1998–2000 tropical ozone climatology 1. Comparison with Total Ozone Mapping Spectrometer (TOMS) and ground-based measurements". Journal of Geophysical Research. 108 (D2): 8238. Bibcode:2003JGRD..108.8238T. doi:10.1029/2001jd000967. hdl:2115/64851. ISSN 0148-0227.
- Pickering, Kenneth E.; Thompson, Anne M.; Wang, Yansen; Tao, Wei-Kuo; McNamara, Donna P.; Kirchhoff, Volker W. J. H.; Heikes, Brian G.; Sachse, Glen W.; Bradshaw, John D. (1996-10-01). "Convective transport of biomass burning emissions over Brazil during TRACE A". Journal of Geophysical Research: Atmospheres. 101 (D19): 23993–24012. Bibcode:1996JGR...10123993P. doi:10.1029/96jd00346. hdl:11603/35154. ISSN 0148-0227.
- Thompson, Anne M.; Witte, Jacquelyn C.; Hudson, Robert D.; Guo, Hua; Herman, Jay R.; Fujiwara, Masatomo (2001-03-16). "Tropical Tropospheric Ozone and Biomass Burning". Science. 291 (5511): 2128–2132. Bibcode:2001Sci...291.2128T. doi:10.1126/science.291.5511.2128. hdl:11603/28525. ISSN 0036-8075. PMID 11251113.

== Awards ==
- Fellow, American Meteorological Society (AMS)
- Fellow, American Association for the Advancement of Sciences (AAAS), 2002
- Fellow, American Geophysical Union (AGU), 2003
- The SHADOZ research team won a NASA honor award for group achievement, 2004
- Fulbright Scholar Award which she used to study human pollution in South Africa, 2010
- American Meteorological Society's Verner Suomi Award for “exceptional vision and leadership in deploying technologies that have significantly advanced the understanding of ozone dynamics in the atmosphere,” 2012
- NASA Senior Goddard Fellow, 2014
- Roger Revelle medal for “outstanding contributions in atmospheric sciences, atmosphere-ocean coupling, atmosphere-land coupling, biogeochemical cycles, climate, or related aspects of the Earth system," 2015
- Goddard's William Nordberg Memorial Award for Earth Sciences, 2018
