= Steven Simring =

Steven Simring (born May 24, 1939, in The Bronx, New York) is a psychiatrist and co-author of several books. He currently serves as an associate professor and vice chairman of the department of psychiatry at UMDNJ-New Jersey Medical School.

== Books written by Simring ==
- Making Marriage Work For Dummies, w/ Sue Klavans Simring and Gene Buscar, ISBN 9781118069196, Publisher: John Wiley & Sons, Ltd., April 2011.
- Psychiatry Recall, 210 pages, with Barbara Fadem, ISBN 9780781745116, ISBN 078174511X, Lippincott Williams & Wilkins, December 2003.
- High-Yield Psychiatry, 2nd Edition, 151 pages, with Barbara Fadem, ISBN 9780781742689, ISBN 0781742684, Lippincott Williams & Wilkins, December 2003.
- Psychiatry Recall PDA: Powered by Skyscape, Inc., Recall Series, 151 pages, with Barbara Fadem, ISBN 9780781754170, ISBN 0781754178, Lippincott Williams & Wilkins, 2004.
- The Compatibility Quotient, 245 pages, w/ Sue Klavans Simring and William Proctor, ISBN 9780449902677, ISBN 0449902676, Fawcett Columbine, 2004.
- Blindspots: Stop Repeating Mistakes That Mess Up Your Love Life, Career, Finances, Marriage, and Happiness (Hardcover) with Sue Klavans Simring and Florence Isaacs, 239 pages, ISBN 9781590770863, ISBN 1590770862, M. Evans and Company Publishing, August 2005.
- How to Win Back the One You Love, w/ Eric Webber, ISBN 0553243500, ISBN 9780553243505, Publisher: Bantam Publishers, 1984.
- Race Trap: Smart Strategies For Effective Racial Communication In Business And In Life, w/ Robert L. Johnson and Gene Buscar, ISBN 0756761581, ISBN 9780756761585, Hardcover edition, 239 pages, HarperBusiness Publishing, November 14, 2000.
