= Chatham Township, New Jersey =

Township in Morris County, New Jersey, US

- Township
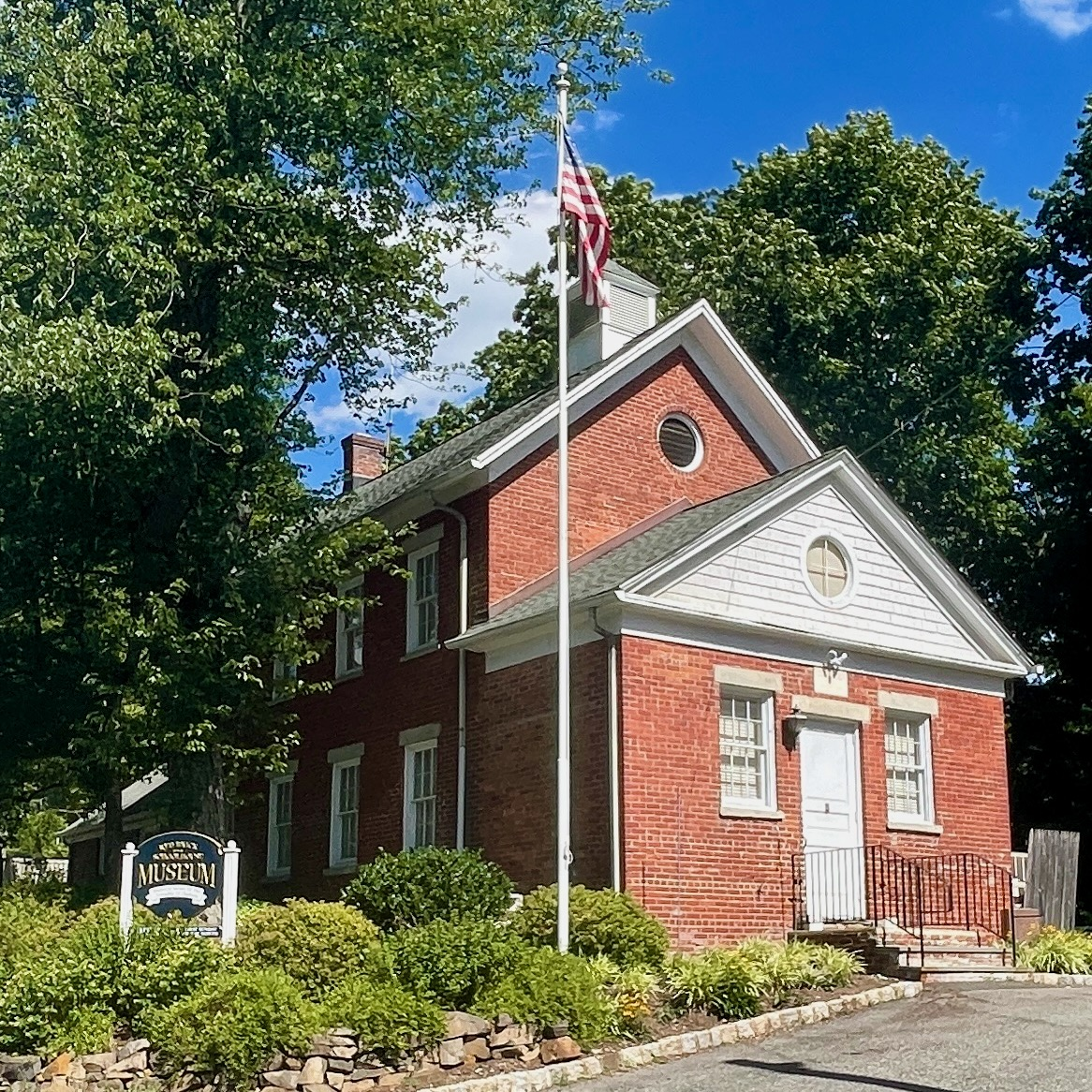
- Mount Vernon School, listed on the National Register of Historic Places

- Seal

- Location of Chatham Township in Morris County highlighted in red (right). Inset map: Location of Morris County in New Jersey highlighted in orange (left).

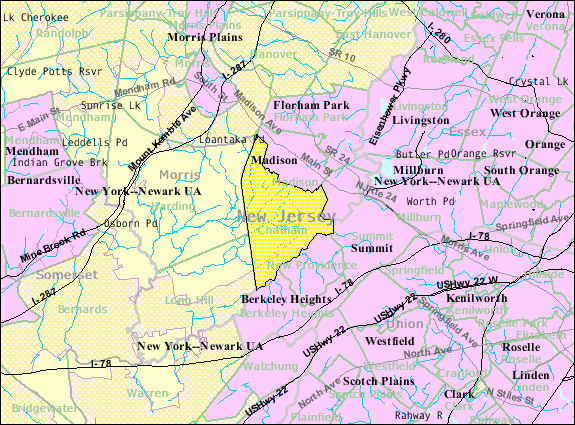
- Census Bureau map of Chatham Township, New Jersey

- Location in Morris County Location in New Jersey Location in the United States
- Coordinates: 40.723214°N 74.43639°W
- Country: United States
- State: New Jersey
- County: Morris
- Incorporated: February 12, 1806
- Named after: William Pitt, 1st Earl of Chatham

Government
  - Type: Township
  - Body: Township Committee
  - Mayor: Jennifer Rowland (D, term ends December 31, 2026)
  - Administrator: Ziad Shehady
  - Municipal clerk: Gregory J. LaConte

Area
  - Total: 9.35 sq mi (24.22 km^{2})
  - Land: 9.08 sq mi (23.51 km^{2})
  - Water: 0.27 sq mi (0.70 km^{2}) 2.91%
  - Rank: 214th of 565 in state 17th of 39 in county
- Elevation: 249 ft (76 m)

Population (2020)
  - Total: 10,983
  - Estimate (2023): 11,127
  - Rank: 229th of 565 in state 18th of 39 in county
  - Density: 1,209.8/sq mi (467.1/km^{2})
  - Rank: 360th of 565 in state 25th of 39 in county
- Time zone: UTC−05:00 (Eastern (EST))
  - Summer (DST): UTC−04:00 (Eastern (EDT))
- ZIP Code: 07928 – Chatham; 07935 – Green Village
- Area code: 973
- FIPS code: 3402712130
- GNIS feature ID: 0882194
- Website: chathamtownship.org

Chatham Township is a suburban township located in Morris County, in the U.S. state of New Jersey. As of the 2020 United States census, the township's population was 10,983, its highest decennial count ever and an increase of 531 (+5.1%) from the 10,452 recorded at the 2010 census, which in turn reflected an increase of 366 (+3.6%) from the 10,086 counted in the 2000 census. The long-established hamlet of Green Village (also within Harding Township) is located in Chatham Township.

The presence of the Chatham station along the Morris and Essex Lines in neighboring Chatham Borough proved a vital role in population increases in Chatham Township, which began to be developed for residential use due to its easy commute to nearby Manhattan.

New Jersey Monthly magazine ranked Chatham Township first in the state in its 2008 rankings of the "Best Places to Live" in New Jersey.

The township has been one of the state's highest-income communities. Based on data from the 2013–2017 American Community Survey, township residents had a median household income of $176,364, ranked 3rd in the state among municipalities with more than 10,000 residents, more than double the statewide median of $76,475. In March 2018, Bloomberg ranked Chatham as the 64th highest-income place in the United States and as having the 8th-highest income in New Jersey.

In 2012, Forbes.com listed Chatham as 375th in its listing of "America's Most Expensive ZIP Codes", with a median home price of $776,703.

== History ==
=== Formation ===
Chatham Township was incorporated by an act of the New Jersey Legislature on February 12, 1806, from portions of Hanover Township and Morris Township. At the time Chatham Township was created, it included the communities of Chatham, Green Village and Bottle Hill (Madison), together with the extensive rural areas surrounding these communities, with each community retaining its own distinct existence and identity. Before the close of that century however, the township would lose all except one of the settlements under its jurisdiction, as they seceded from the township and established their own municipal governments.

The community known as Bottle Hill was established in the early eighteenth century in Morris Township when the area was within the English Province of New Jersey. Bottle Hill changed its name to Madison in 1834 to honor President James Madison. On December 27, 1889, Madison was incorporated as an independent borough and its former village boundaries were expanded between 1891 - 1899 with annexed portions of rural lands that had formerly been within the township.

The settlement of Chatham had been established in 1710 as John Day's Bridge and, in 1773 when New Jersey was an English province, adopted the name of Chatham to honor William Pitt, 1st Earl of Chatham, a British supporter of the colonial cause. This village also had been within Morris Township and it was an active community in the Revolutionary War. On August 19, 1892, Chatham seceded from the new township that had taken its name and adopted the village form of government established in the United States for the new state of New Jersey. Shortly thereafter, Chatham adopted the borough form of government on March 1, 1897.

Florham Park was formed from portions of the township on March 20, 1899.

Most of Green Village has always been within the township's jurisdiction.

In 1773, the village John Day's Bridge, a community governed by the English township of Morris since its settlement in 1710, was renamed as, Chatham, in honor of Sir William Pitt, a British prime minister and the first Earl of Chatham, who was most favorable toward the colonists of the Province of New Jersey in issues with the British government. Participation in the Revolutionary War was significant by the residents of Chatham. Nearby Morristown was the military center of the revolution, where the winter headquarters were established twice, and revolutionary troops were active in the entire area regularly.

The township form of government is the oldest form of municipal government in the state of New Jersey following the revolution. That form of local government dates back to New Jersey's Township Act of 1798. Chatham Township was formed on February 12, 1806, with jurisdiction over the area of present-day Chatham Borough several communities and settlements, including some that had been part of Hanover and Morris Townships. A great deal of open, swampy, and mountainous land was included with the hamlets.

For a while, the new township included what are now Madison, Chatham Borough and Florham Park, as well as all of Green Village and all of the lands still governed by Chatham Township, but over time these settlements began to secede because of contention over insufficient funding of their projects. Disposition of funds from taxes was perceived as inequitable to the settled areas given their needs versus that of the rural areas, causing them to form their own taxation and governance systems.

Of the pre-revolutionary settlements included in its jurisdiction when it was formed, only portions of Green Village have remained governed by Chatham Township, which has never had a community center.

On December 27, 1889, based on the results of a referendum passed three days earlier, the village of Madison seceded from Chatham Township and adopted the borough form of government in order to develop a local water supply system for its population of 3,250. Madison annexed additional portions of Chatham Township in 1891, and annexed more each year from 1894 to 1898, followed finally, by an exchange of some lands in 1899 with Chatham Township.

In the midst of these changes, in 1892 "...Chatham Village found itself at odds with the rest of the township. Although village residents paid 40 percent of the township taxes, they got only 7 percent of the receipts in services. The village had to raise its own money to install kerosene street lamps and its roads were in poor repair. As a result, the village voted on August 9, 1892, to secede from the township."

The municipality that is now Florham Park was originally part of Hanover Township, before being included in the township formed in 1806 as Chatham Township. When it seceded from Chatham Township, it incorporated as a borough as Florham Park on March 20, 1899.

The boundaries of Chatham Township have remained unchanged since 1899.

Post-World War II suburban development ensued in the 1950s when farm lands, greenhouses, and flower nurseries began to be sold off. Families moved out to this rural suburban area as ownership of automobiles increased dramatically.

The township experienced even more extensive residential development, starting with the 1960s and 1970s, when rezoning enabled residential development of the open spaces and several farms and woodlands were sold off to developers. For several generations, the largest, the Schwartz Farm had produced dairy products that were sold in local stores and schools and that were delivered to homes on scheduled routes. Former rose farms became two major shopping centers near the corner of Shunpike Road and Southern Boulevard. The corner was known as Hickory Tree, named for a hickory tree planted during President Madison's term.

Heyl Roses in Green Village was the last and oldest commercial rose and cut flower grower in New Jersey, until its closure in 1999.

After successfully crossing the Delaware River and subsequent battles in Trenton and Princeton, General Washington marched to Morristown and established his headquarters in Arnold's Tavern on the Morristown Green for the Continental Army’s first winter encampment. Most of the army was sent a few miles southeast to the Lowantica Valley (modern spelling Loantaka) in Chatham Township, at a site located north of Loantaka Brook, East of Tredwell Avenue and West of Giralda Farms. In 2016, the Morris County Park Commission and the Chatham Township Historical Society began working together to reclaim the area and create trails and apply for grants for informational signage.

== Geography ==
According to the United States Census Bureau, the township had a total area of 9.35 square miles (24.22 km^{2}), including 9.08 square miles (23.51 km^{2}) of land and 0.27 square miles (0.70 km^{2}) of water (2.91%).

Chatham Township is located about 25 miles (40 km) west of New York City on the eastern edge of Morris County. Chatham Township's neighboring municipalities to the south are Summit, New Providence, and Berkeley Heights in Union County. Long Hill Township and Harding Township (and its New Vernon section) to the west, Madison to the north, and Chatham Borough to the east all of which lie within Morris County.

Unincorporated communities, localities and place names located partially or completely within the township include Floral Hill, Great Swamp, Green Village (partially in Harding Township), Hickory Tree, Mount Vernon and The Orchard.

Green Village is the site of the Rolling Knolls Landfill, a landfill identified by the United States Environmental Protection Agency as a Superfund site. The landfill is bordered on two sides by the Great Swamp National Wildlife Refuge, and was formerly known as Miele's Dump, after owner Robert Miele. In operation from the 1930s until the late 1960s, the landfill accepted a wide variety of waste material from municipal and industrial sources, including residential septage and pharmaceutical materials. In 2010, the township designated the site as a redevelopment zone, with the possibility that the area could be remediated as a solar farm.

=== Weather ===
Chatham Township has a humid subtropical climate and is slightly more variant (lows are colder, highs are warmer) than its neighbor 20 miles (32 km) east: New York City.

Climate data for Chatham (07928, includes Chatham Borough and Township)
Month	Jan	Feb	Mar	Apr	May	Jun	Jul	Aug	Sep	Oct	Nov	Dec	Year
Record high °F (°C)	73 (23)	82 (28)	89 (32)	96 (36)	97 (36)	103 (39)	107 (42)	104 (40)	99 (37)	93 (34)	84 (29)	76 (24)	107 (42)
Mean daily maximum °F (°C)	39 (4)	42 (6)	51 (11)	62 (17)	73 (23)	82 (28)	86 (30)	85 (29)	78 (26)	66 (19)	55 (13)	44 (7)	64 (18)
Mean daily minimum °F (°C)	18 (−8)	20 (−7)	28 (−2)	38 (3)	47 (8)	57 (14)	63 (17)	61 (16)	53 (12)	40 (4)	32 (0)	24 (−4)	40 (4)
Record low °F (°C)	−25 (−32)	−26 (−32)	−6 (−21)	12 (−11)	25 (−4)	31 (−1)	41 (5)	35 (2)	26 (−3)	13 (−11)	—	−16 (−27)	−26 (−32)
Average precipitation inches (mm)	3.54 (90)	2.91 (74)	4.20 (107)	4.29 (109)	4.38 (111)	4.70 (119)	4.73 (120)	4.42 (112)	4.89 (124)	4.65 (118)	4.06 (103)	4.13 (105)	50.90 (1,293)

== Demographics ==
Historical population
Census	Pop.	Note	%±
1810	2,019		—
1820	1,832		−9.3%
1830	1,874		2.3%
1840	2,138		14.1%
1850	2,469		15.5%
1860	2,968		20.2%
1870	3,715		25.2%
1880	4,276		15.1%
1890	4,681	*	9.5%
1900	620	*	−86.8%
1910	812		31.0%
1920	735		−9.5%
1930	1,115		51.7%
1940	2,026		81.7%
1950	2,825		39.4%
1960	5,931		109.9%
1970	8,093		36.5%
1980	8,883		9.8%
1990	9,361		5.4%
2000	10,086		7.7%
2010	10,452		3.6%
2020	10,983		5.1%
2023 (est.)	11,127		1.3%
Population sources: 1810–1920 1840 1850–1870; 1850 1870 1880–1890; 1890–1910 1910–1930; 1940–2000 2000; 2010 2020 * = Lost territory in previous decade.

=== 2020 census ===
Chatham Township, Morris County, New Jersey – Racial and ethnic composition Note: the US Census treats Hispanic/Latino as an ethnic category. This table excludes Latinos from the racial categories and assigns them to a separate category. Hispanics/Latinos may be of any race.
Race / Ethnicity (NH = Non-Hispanic)	Pop 2000	Pop 2010	Pop 2020	% 2000	% 2010	% 2020
White alone (NH)	9,282	9,197	8,549	92.03%	87.99%	77.84%
Black or African American alone (NH)	41	69	81	0.41%	0.66%	0.74%
Native American or Alaska Native alone (NH)	5	6	4	0.05%	0.06%	0.04%
Asian alone (NH)	483	657	1,387	4.79%	6.29%	12.63%
Native Hawaiian or Pacific Islander alone (NH)	1	1	0	0.01%	0.01%	0.00%
Other race alone (NH)	4	13	57	0.04%	0.12%	0.52%
Mixed race or Multiracial (NH)	73	160	391	0.72%	1.53%	3.56%
Hispanic or Latino (any race)	197	349	514	1.95%	3.34%	4.68%
Total	10,086	10,452	10,983	100.00%	100.00%	100.00%

=== 2010 census ===
The 2010 United States census counted 10,452 people, 3,915 households, and 2,721 families in the township. The population density was 1,164.2 per square mile (449.5/km^{2}). There were 4,128 housing units at an average density of 459.8 per square mile (177.5/km^{2}). The racial makeup was 90.84% (9,495) White, 0.75% (78) Black or African American, 0.08% (8) Native American, 6.36% (665) Asian, 0.01% (1) Pacific Islander, 0.38% (40) from other races, and 1.58% (165) from two or more races. Hispanic or Latino of any race were 3.34% (349) of the population.

Of the 3,915 households, 37.5% had children under the age of 18; 63.2% were married couples living together; 4.8% had a female householder with no husband present and 30.5% were non-families. Of all households, 27.1% were made up of individuals and 11.9% had someone living alone who was 65 years of age or older. The average household size was 2.64 and the average family size was 3.29.

28.9% of the population were under the age of 18, 4.1% from 18 to 24, 20.1% from 25 to 44, 31.8% from 45 to 64, and 15.1% who were 65 years of age or older. The median age was 43.3 years. For every 100 females, the population had 89.1 males. For every 100 females ages 18 and older there were 85.5 males.

The Census Bureau's 2006–2010 American Community Survey showed that (in 2010 inflation-adjusted dollars) median household income was $127,679 (with a margin of error of +/− $9,764) and the median family income was $182,216 (+/− $30,473). Males had a median income of $144,400 (+/− $29,559) versus $61,912 (+/− $8,237) for females. The per capita income for the borough was $78,905 (+/− $6,319). About 1.2% of families and 3.6% of the population were below the poverty line, including 3.1% of those under age 18 and 1.5% of those age 65 or over.

Based on data from the 2006-2010 American Community Survey, Chatham Township had a per capita income of $78,905 (ranked 14th in the state), compared to per capita income in Morris County of $47,342 and statewide of $34,858.

=== 2000 census ===
As of the 2000 United States census there were 10,086 people, 3,920 households, and 2,771 families residing in Chatham Township. The population density was 1,081.0 inhabitants per square mile (417.4/km^{2}). There were 4,019 housing units at an average density of 430.8 per square mile (166.3/km^{2}). The racial makeup was 93.71% White, 0.45% African American, 0.06% Native American, 4.81% Asian, 0.01% Pacific Islander, 0.15% from other races, and 0.81% from two or more races. Hispanic or Latino of any race were 1.95% of the population.

There were 3,920 households, out of which 34.7% had children under the age of 18 living with them, 63.4% were married couples living together, 5.9% had a female householder with no husband present, and 29.3% were non-families. 26.3% of all households were made up of individuals, and 8.7% had someone living alone who was 65 years of age or older. The average household size was 2.54 and the average family size was 3.11.

The population was spread out, with 26.7% under the age of 18, 3.7% from 18 to 24, 28.7% from 25 to 44, 27.4% from 45 to 64, and 13.5% who were 65 years of age or older. The median age was 40 years. For every 100 females, there were 90.9 males. For every 100 females age 18 and over, there were 85.6 males.

The median income for a household was $106,208, and the median income for a family was $131,609. Males had a median income of $100,000 versus $58,750 for females. The per capita income was $65,497. About 1.9% of families and 2.7% of the population were below the poverty line, including 3.0% of those under age 18 and 2.9% of those age 65 or over.

== Government ==
=== Local government ===
Chatham Township is governed under the Township form of New Jersey municipal government, one of 141 municipalities (of the 564) statewide that use this form, the second-most commonly used form of government in the state. The Township Committee is comprised of five members, who are elected directly by the voters at-large in partisan elections to serve three-year terms of office on a staggered basis, with either one or two seats coming up for election each year as part of the November general election in a three-year cycle. At an annual reorganization meeting, the Township Committee selects one of its members to serve as mayor. The ceremonial mayor serves as the chair of the township committee and has powers vested in the mayor's office by general law. The township committee is the legislative branch of the community's government and establishes policies for the administration of the various departments. The committee appoints the township administrator who is responsible for carrying out those policies and overseeing the day-to-day operations. Subcommittees of the township committee are public safety; public works; planning, engineering, and land use; parks and recreation; general administration; and finance. Two members of the township committee serve on each and provide oversight to the departments.

As of 2026, members of the Chatham Township Committee are Mayor Jennifer Rowland (term on committee and as mayor both end December 31, 2026), Deputy Mayor Marty McHugh (D, term on committee and as deputy mayor both end December 31, 2026), Craig Alperowitz (D, 2027), Michael D. Choi (D, 2028) and Stacy Ewald (D, 2028).

=== Federal, state, and county representation ===
Chatham Township is located in the 11th Congressional District and is part of New Jersey's 21st state legislative district.

For the 119th United States Congress, New Jersey's 11th congressional district is represented by Analilia Mejia (D, Glen Ridge) who was elected in a 2026 special election to serve for the remainder of the Congress following the resignation Mikie Sherrill (D, Montclair), who was elected Governor of New Jersey in 2025. New Jersey is represented in the United States Senate by Democrats Cory Booker (Newark, term ends 2027) and Andy Kim (Moorestown, term ends 2031).

For the 2026–2027 session, the 21st legislative district of the New Jersey Legislature is represented in the State Senate by Jon Bramnick (R, Westfield) and in the General Assembly by Vincent Kearney (D, Garwood) and Andrew Macurdy (D, Summit).

Morris County is governed by a Board of County Commissioners comprised of seven members who are elected at-large in partisan elections to three-year terms on a staggered basis, with either one or three seats up for election each year as part of the November general election. Actual day-to-day operation of departments is supervised by County Administrator Deena Leary.

As of 2026, Morris County's Commissioners (with all terms ending December 31) are Director Stephen H. Shaw (R, Mountain Lakes, 2027), Deputy Director John Krickus (R, Washington Township, 2027), Douglas Cabana (R, Boonton Township, 2028), Thomas J. Mastrangelo (R, Montville, 2028), Christine Myers (R, Harding Township, 2028), Tayfun Selen (R, Chatham Township, 2026), and Deborah Smith (R, Denville Township, 2027).

The county's constitutional officers are County Clerk Ann F. Grossi (R, Parsippany–Troy Hills, 2028), Sheriff James M. Gannon (R, Boonton Township, 2025) and Surrogate Heather Darling (R, Roxbury, 2029).

=== Politics ===
United States presidential election results for Chatham Township 2024 2020 2016 2012 2008 2004
Year	Republican		Democratic		Third party(ies)	
Year	No.	%	No.	%	No.	%
2024	2,686	41.55%	3,649	56.44%	130	2.01%
2020	2,739	39.59%	4,078	58.94%	102	1.47%
2016	2,696	45.23%	3,057	51.29%	207	3.47%
2012	3,393	61.74%	2,064	37.55%	39	0.71%
2008	3,259	54.16%	2,699	44.86%	59	0.98%
2004	3,499	59.50%	2,334	39.69%	48	0.82%

As of May 2016, there were a total of 7,925 registered voters in Chatham Township, of which 1,528 (19.28%) were registered as Democrats, 3,266 (38.4%) were registered as Republicans and 3,131 (39.5%) were registered as either Unaffiliated or as Libertarians or Greens.

Gubernatorial election results for Chatham Township
Year	Republican		Democratic		Third party(ies)	
Year	No.	%	No.	%	No.	%
2025	2,432	45.08%	2,949	54.66%	14	0.26%
2021	2,326	50.93%	2,215	48.50%	26	0.57%
2017	2,013	53.41%	1,705	45.24%	51	1.35%
2013	2,594	75.25%	814	23.61%	39	1.13%
2009	2,583	60.96%	1,236	29.17%	418	9.87%
2005	2,268	60.22%	1,442	38.29%	56	1.49%

In the 2012 presidential election, Republican Mitt Romney received 61.7% of the vote (3,393 cast), ahead of Democrat Barack Obama with 37.6% (2,064 votes), and other candidates with 0.7% (39 votes), among the 5,521 ballots cast by the township's 7,810 registered voters (25 ballots were spoiled), for a turnout of 70.7%. In the 2008 presidential election, Republican John McCain received 53.8% of the vote (3,259 cast), ahead of Democrat Barack Obama with 44.6% (2,699 votes) and other candidates with 1.0% (59 votes), among the 6,053 ballots cast by the township's 7,639 registered voters, for a turnout of 79.2%. In the 2004 presidential election, Republican George W. Bush received 59.3% of the vote (3,499 ballots cast), outpolling Democrat John Kerry with 39.5% (2,334 votes) and other candidates with 0.6% (48 votes), among the 5,905 ballots cast by the township's 7,614 registered voters, for a turnout percentage of 77.6.

In the 2013 gubernatorial election, Republican Chris Christie received 75.3% of the vote (2,594 cast), ahead of Democrat Barbara Buono with 23.6% (814 votes), and other candidates with 1.1% (39 votes), among the 3,499 ballots cast by the township's 7,748 registered voters (52 ballots were spoiled), for a turnout of 45.2%. In the 2009 gubernatorial election, Republican Chris Christie received 60.7% of the vote (2,583 ballots cast), ahead of Democrat Jon Corzine with 29.1% (1,236 votes), Independent Chris Daggett with 9.5% (405 votes) and other candidates with 0.3% (13 votes), among the 4,252 ballots cast by the township's 7,407 registered voters, yielding a 57.4% turnout.

Chatham Township has had a Democratic shift since 2016, with the gap between Republicans and Democrats closing significantly. In the recent 2024 Election, Democrats won the popular vote in the Township––56.44% to Republicans' 41.55%––maintaining an over six-point advantage of Republicans since their recent highest vote total in the 2020 Election. 2024 was also the first time in over 20 years that Democrats won the popular vote for the election of Senator Andy Kim.

United States Senate election results for Chatham Township1
Year	Republican		Democratic		Third party(ies)	
Year	No.	%	No.	%	No.	%
2024	2,923	45.87%	3,382	53.08%	67	1.05%
2018	2,850	53.12%	2,386	44.47%	129	2.40%
2012	3,215	62.01%	1,922	37.07%	48	0.93%
2006	2,402	60.52%	1,529	38.52%	38	0.96%

United States Senate election results for Chatham Township2
Year	Republican		Democratic		Third party(ies)	
Year	No.	%	No.	%	No.	%
2020	3,143	45.98%	3,655	53.47%	37	0.54%
2014	1,808	57.60%	1,295	41.26%	36	1.15%
2013	1,435	56.59%	1,087	42.86%	14	0.55%
2008	3,420	61.29%	2,102	37.67%	58	1.04%

=== Shared services ===
Chatham Township shares various joint public services with Chatham Borough: the recreation program, the library (since 1974), the school district (created in 1986), the municipal court, and medical emergency squad (since 1936).

Together with Chatham Borough, Harding Township, Madison and Morris Township, Chatham Township is a member of a joint municipal court, which was created in 2010 and is located in Madison.

== Education ==
=== Public schools ===
The School District of the Chathams is a regional public school district serving students in pre-kindergarten through twelfth grade from Chatham Borough, New Jersey and Chatham Township. Chatham Borough and Chatham Township held elections in November 1986 to consider joining their (at the time separate) school districts. This proposal was supported by the voters of both communities and since then, the two municipalities have shared a regionalized school district.

As of the 2020–21 school year, the district, comprised of six schools, had an enrollment of 3,930 students and 342.8 classroom teachers (on an FTE basis), for a student–teacher ratio of 11.5:1. Schools in the district (with 2020–21 enrollment data from the National Center for Education Statistics) are Milton Avenue School with 284 students in grades Pre-K–3, Southern Boulevard School with 414 students in grades K–3, Washington Avenue School with 314 students in grades K–3, Lafayette School with 592 students in grades 4–5, Chatham Middle School with 984 students in grades 6–8 and Chatham High School with 1,315 students in grades 9–12. The district's board of education is comprised of nine members who set policy and oversee the fiscal and educational operation of the district through its administration; the seats on the board are allocated to the constituent municipalities based on population, with Chatham Township assigned five seats.

For the 2004–2005 school year, Chatham High School was recognized with the National Blue Ribbon School Award of Excellence by the United States Department of Education, the highest award an American school can receive. Milton Avenue School was one of 11 in the state to be recognized in 2014 by the United States Department of Education's National Blue Ribbon Schools Program. The district's high school was the 1st-ranked public high school in New Jersey out of 339 schools statewide in New Jersey Monthly magazine's September 2014 cover story on the state's "Top Public High Schools", using a new ranking methodology. The school had been ranked 20th in the state of 328 schools in 2012, after being ranked 8th in 2010 out of 322 schools listed.

=== Private school ===
Chatham Day School is a private coeducational day school located in Chatham Township, serving students in preschool through eighth grade. The school has a total enrollment of 115 students. Founded in 1998, the school changed its name from The Darcy School after finding a permanent campus in Chatham Township in 2005.

== Transportation ==
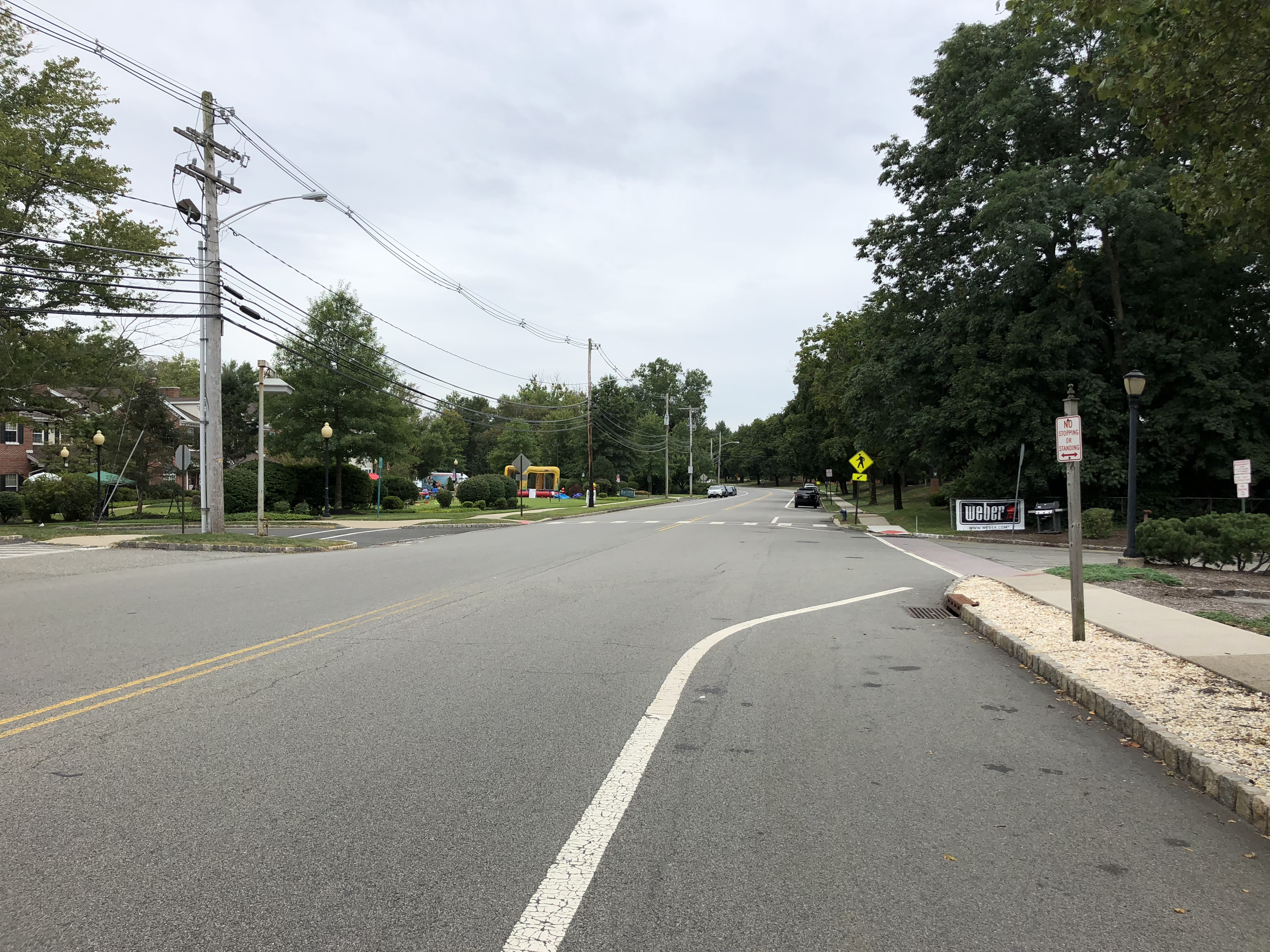
County Route 647 (Southern Boulevard) in Chatham Township

=== Roads and highways ===
As of May 2010, the township had a total of 48.14 miles (77.47 km) of roadways, of which 37.14 miles (59.77 km) were maintained by the municipality and 11.00 miles (17.70 km) by Morris County.

No Interstate, U.S. or state highways cross Chatham Township. The only significant roads are minor county routes such as County Route 646 and County Route 647. However, Interstate 78 and Interstate 287 are both located in adjacent municipalities.

=== Public transportation ===
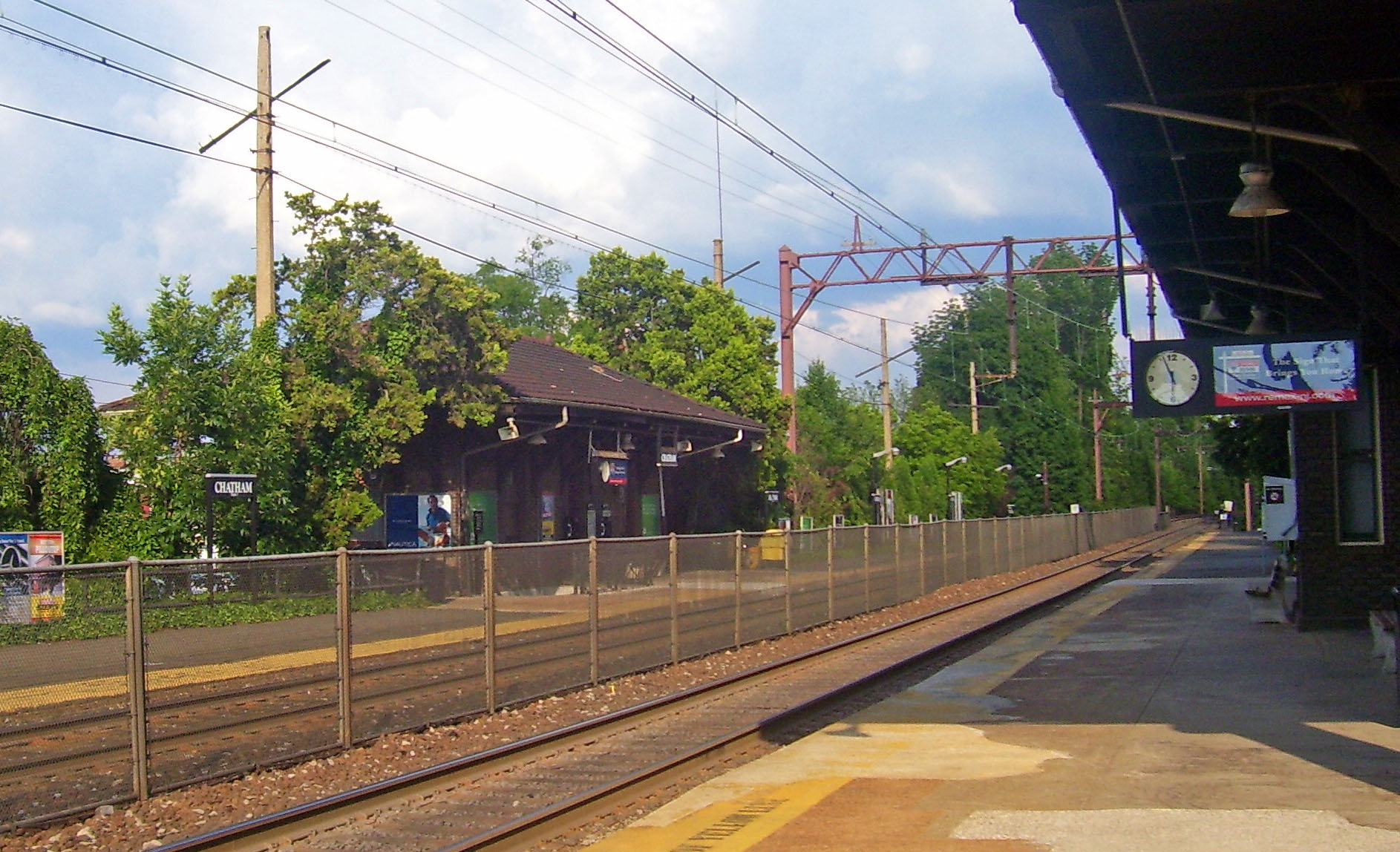
Chatham railroad station

NJ Transit provides commuter rail service at the Chatham station. Trains operate on the Morristown Line, with trains heading to the Hoboken Terminal and to New York Penn Station in Midtown Manhattan. It is a short drive from most of the township to the stations in Chatham and Madison, while the southern part of the township is closer to the Murray Hill station on the Gladstone Branch.

NJ Transit local bus service had been provided on the MCM8 route.

== Mail service ==
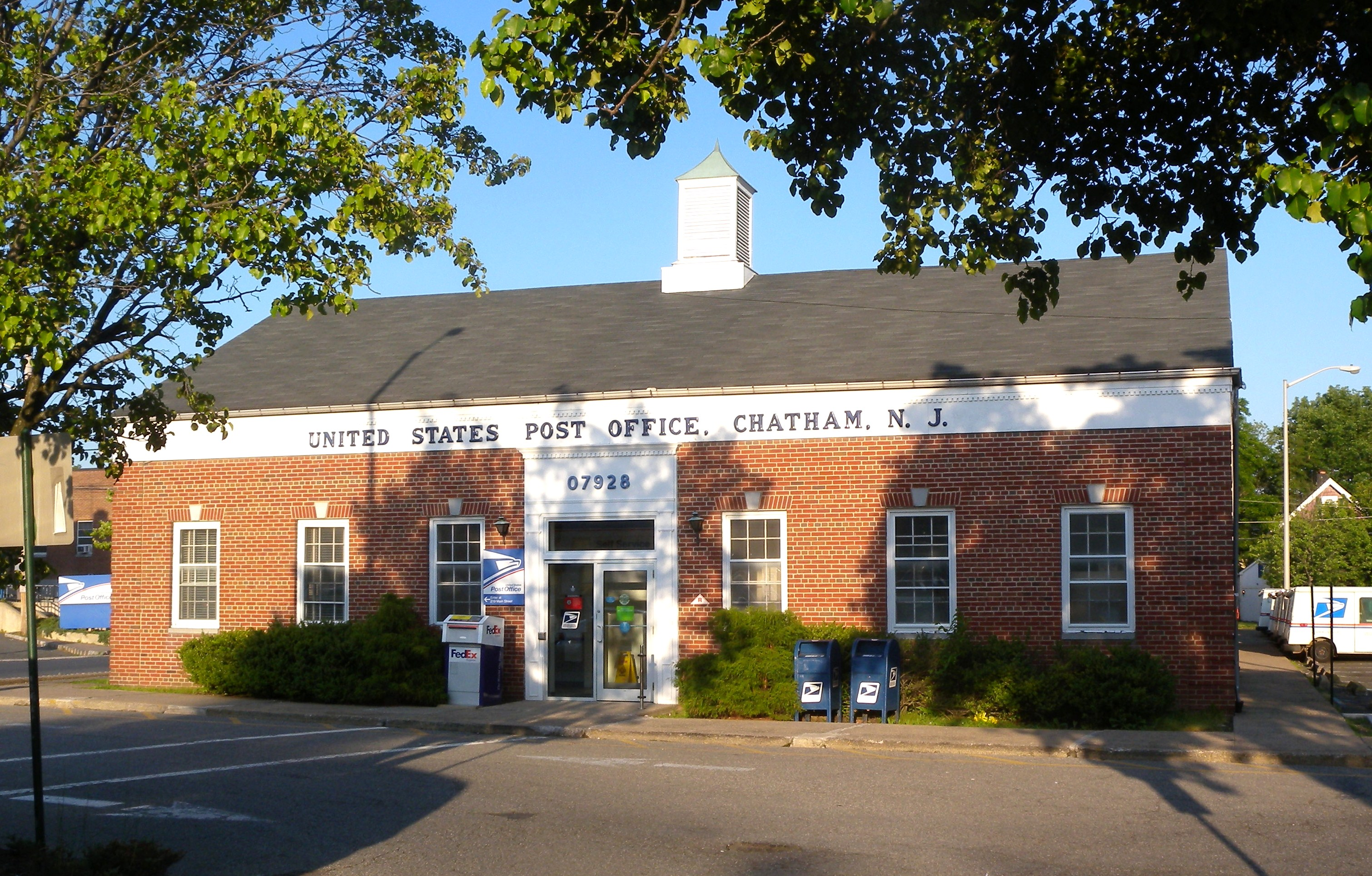
The old Chatham Post Office building, which serves as an annex to the main building nearby

Chatham Township residents receive mail service through the post offices for Green Village and Chatham, depending on their ZIP Code. Green Village, a community partially located within Chatham Township, has a ZIP Code of 07935 and a post office located at 372 Green Village Road. The remaining area of Chatham Township (which constitutes the majority of its area) is served by the Chatham post office, whose ZIP Code is 07928. The main Chatham post office is located at 219 Main Street, across from the library, and its annex is in the old post office, around the corner at 19 Railroad Plaza facing the fire station.

== Points of interest ==
- The Mount Vernon School, built 1860, once served as the township hall and is now the Red Brick Schoolhouse Museum. It was added to the National Register of Historic Places for its significance in education, politics/government, and social history.
- The Price-Baldwin House on Southern Boulevard, originally built c. 1770, was expanded by Edward Price, a successful farmer and blacksmith, in the 1830s.
- The Lewis Noe Farmstead, built c. 1770, played a role during the American Revolutionary War.
- The William Gibbons Stable and Farm, built c. 1830s, was built by prominent racing patron, William Gibbons to house his thoroughbred racehorses, including Fashion, "Queen of the American Turf".
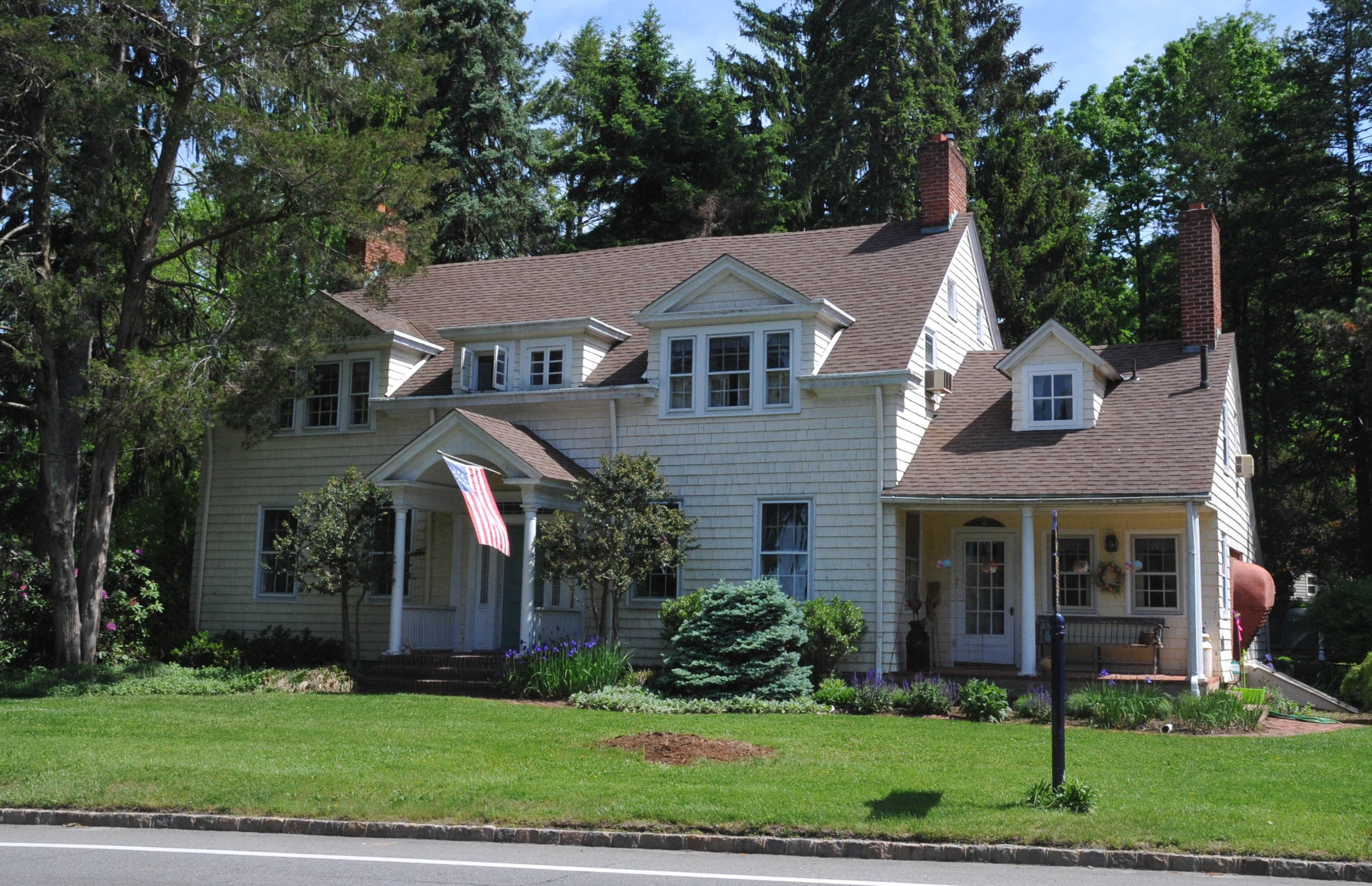
Price-Baldwin House

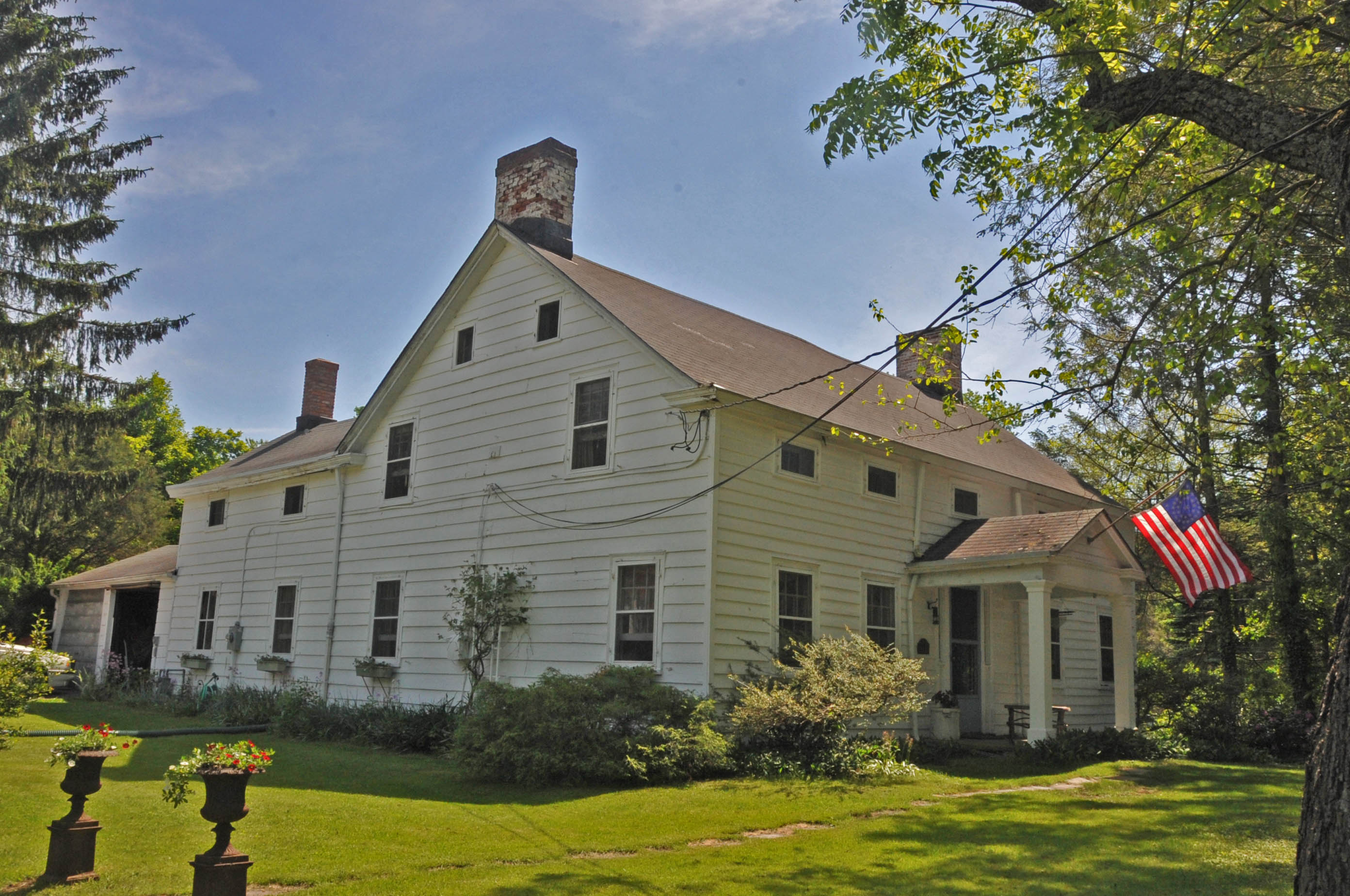
Lewis Noe Farmstead

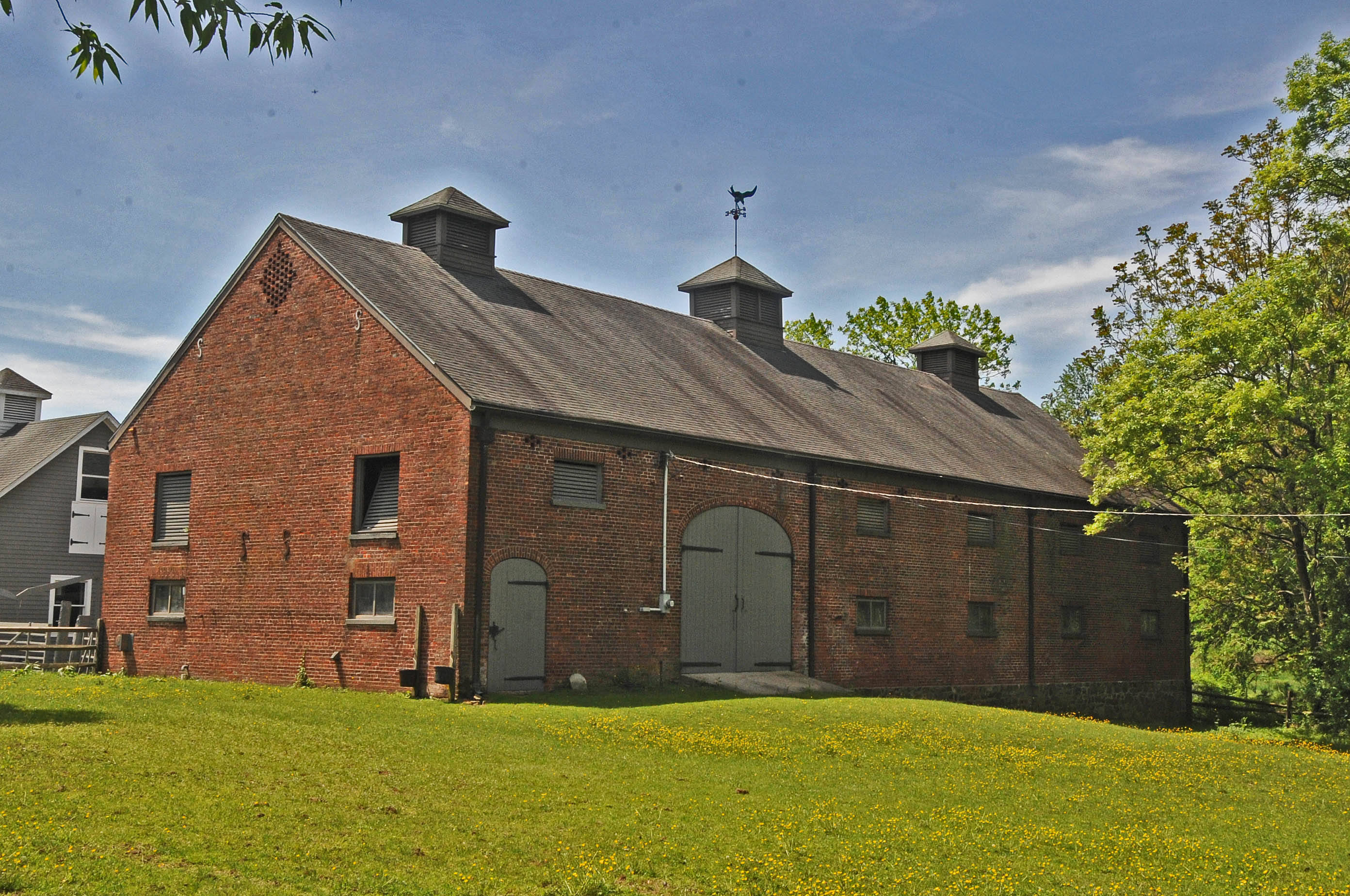
William Gibbons Stable and Farm

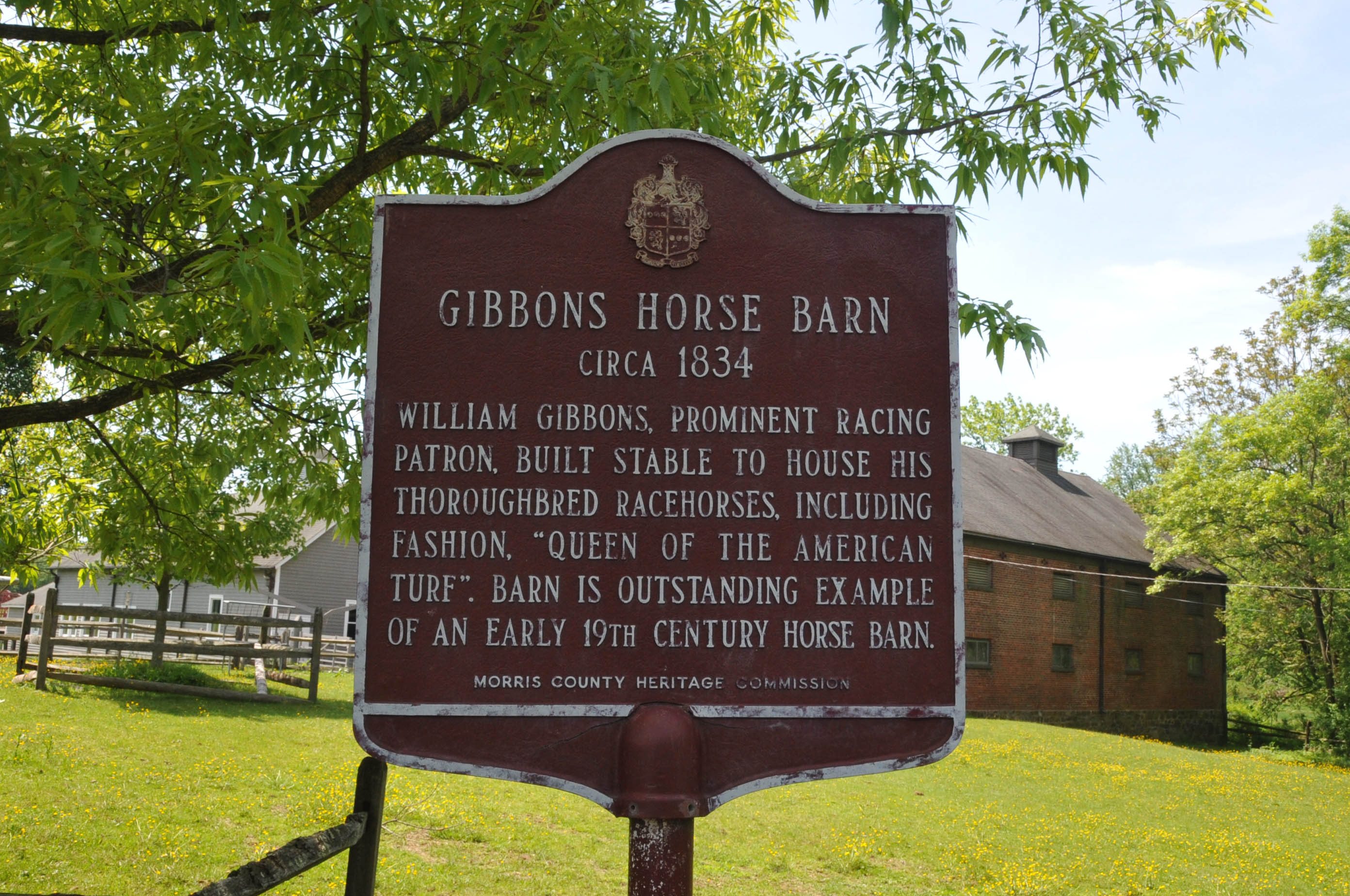
Morris County Heritage Commission sign for the Gibbons Horse Barn

== Notable people ==
People who were born in, residents of, or otherwise closely associated with Chatham Township include:

- Madame Bey (c. 1881–1942), Turkish-born opera singer who ran a camp for boxers from 1923 until her death
- Lincoln Brower (1931–2018), was an American entomologist and ecologist, best known for his research on monarch butterflies
- Dan Canter (born 1961), soccer defender who played three seasons in the North American Soccer League and three in Major Indoor Soccer League, in addition to playing with the United States men's national soccer team
- Glenn Davis, sportscaster best known as the lead play-by-play announcer for local TV broadcasts of the Houston Dynamo FC
- Dave Given (born 1954), former ice hockey right winger who played one game in the World Hockey Association for the Vancouver Blazers
- Kathleen Hagen (1945–2015), physician who was convicted of murdering her parents by asphyxiation in their Chatham Township home
- Don Herrmann (born 1947), former wide receiver in the National Football League who played for the New York Giants and the New Orleans Saints
- Deep Katdare (born 1970), financier and former actor
- Peter Kuhn (1955–2009), race car driver who won both the USAC and SCCA Formula Super Vee championships in 1980
- Alex Laferriere (born 2001), professional ice hockey right winger for the Los Angeles Kings
- Dorthy Moxley (1932–2024), educator and crime victim advocate
- Drew O'Connor (born 1998), professional ice hockey left winger for the Vancouver Canucks
- Andrew Prendeville (born 1981), professional automobile racer
- Anne M. Thompson, specialist in atmospheric chemistry
- Billy Walsh (born 1975), former professional soccer player who played for the MetroStars
