= School District of the Chathams =

School district in Morris County, New Jersey

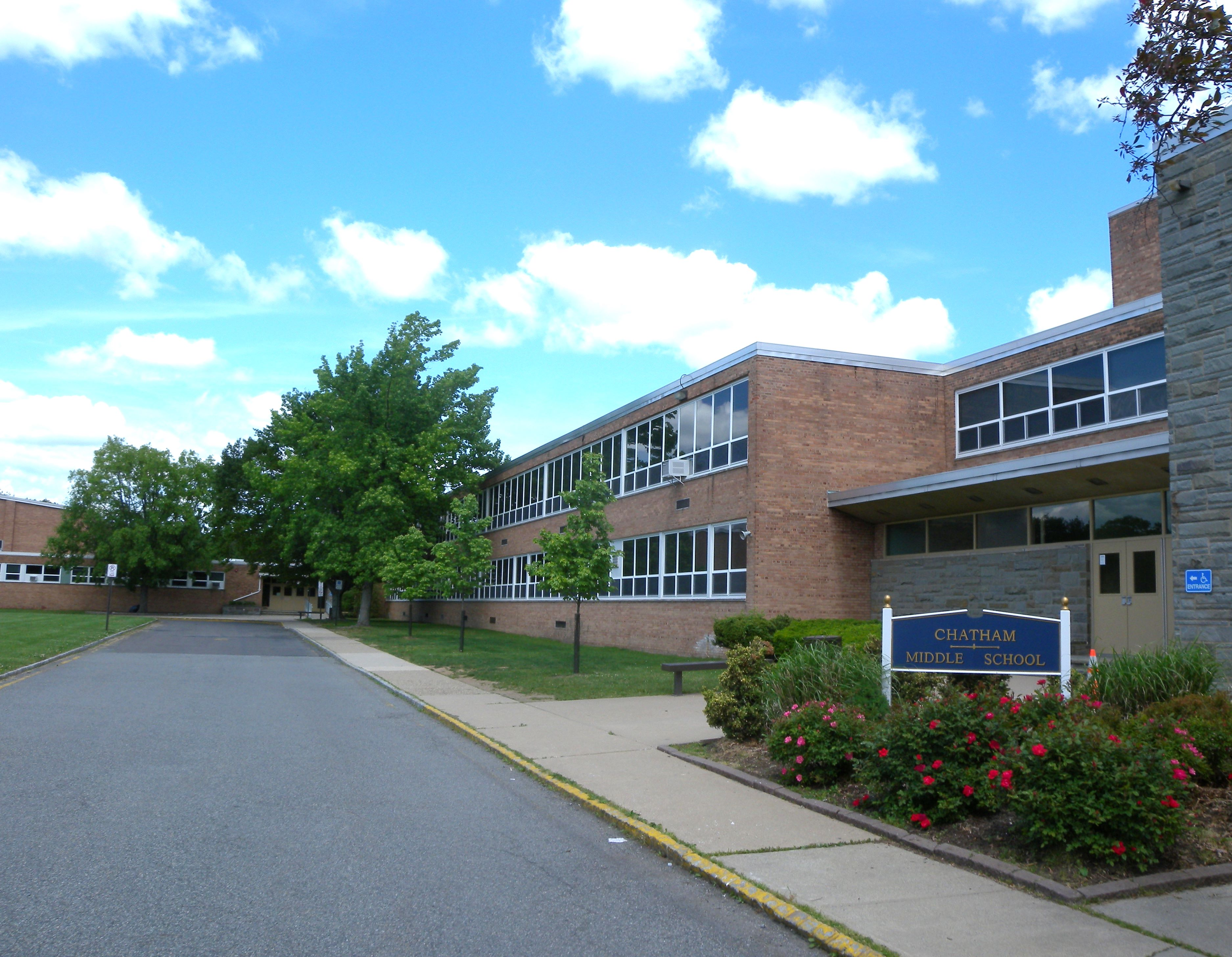
- Chatham Middle School

Address
- 259 Lafayette Avenue Chatham Township, Morris County, 07928; United States
- Coordinates: 40.704328°N 74.434922°W

District information
- Grades: PreK-12
- Superintendent: Emily Sortino
- Business administrator: Peter Daquila
- Schools: 6

Students and staff
- Enrollment: 3,563 (as of 2024–25)
- Faculty: 322.71 FTEs
- Student–teacher ratio: 11.04:1

Other information
- District Factor Group: J
- Website: www.chatham-nj.org
Ind.	Per pupil	District spending	Rank (*)	K-12 average	%± vs. average
1A	Total Spending	$16,037	16	$18,891	−15.1%
1	Budgetary Cost	12,954	21	14,783	−12.4%
2	Classroom Instruction	7,590	11	8,763	−13.4%
6	Support Services	2,004	33	2,392	−16.2%
8	Administrative Cost	1,512	62	1,485	1.8%
10	Operations & Maintenance	1,519	39	1,783	−14.8%
13	Extracurricular Activities	318	78	268	18.7%
16	Median Teacher Salary	64,125	49	64,043
Data from NJDoE 2014 Taxpayers' Guide to Education Spending. *Of K-12 districts with more than 3,500 students. Lowest spending=1; Highest=103

The School District of the Chathams is a regional public school district serving students in pre-kindergarten through twelfth grade from Chatham Borough and Chatham Township in Morris County, in the U.S. state of New Jersey.

As of the 2020–21 school year, the district, comprising six schools, had an enrollment of 3,930 students and 342.8 classroom teachers (on an FTE basis), for a student–teacher ratio of 11.5:1.

The district is classified by the New Jersey Department of Education as being in District Factor Group "J", the-highest of eight groupings. District Factor Groups organize districts statewide to allow comparison by common socioeconomic characteristics of the local districts. From lowest socioeconomic status to highest, the categories are A, B, CD, DE, FG, GH, I and J.

Elections were held in both municipalities in November 1986 to consider joining the disparate school systems of the two communities into a combined regional district. This proposal was supported by the voters and since then, the two municipalities have shared a regionalized school district.

For the 2025–26 academic year, the school district will shift its distribution of grades within the schools of the Borough and Township. Washington and Southern are set to go from K–3 to K–2, whereas Milton is set to go from pre-K-3 to pre-K-2; Lafayette will go from 4 to 5 to 3–4, and, finally, Chatham Middle School will add fifth grade to become 5–8. These changes come in regard to age demographic trends and class sizes noted across both towns.

== Awards, recognition and rankings ==
For the 2004-05 school year, Chatham High School was recognized with the Blue Ribbon School Award of Excellence by the United States Department of Education, the highest award an American school can receive. Milton Avenue School was one of 11 in the state to be recognized in 2014 by the United States Department of Education's National Blue Ribbon Schools Program. In 2015, Southern Boulevard School was one of 15 schools in New Jersey, and one of nine public schools, recognized as a National Blue Ribbon School in the exemplary high performing category.

The district's high school was the 1st-ranked public high school in New Jersey out of 339 schools statewide in New Jersey Monthly magazine's September 2014 cover story on the state's "Top Public High Schools", using a new ranking methodology. The school had been ranked 20th in the state of 328 schools in 2012, after being ranked 8th in 2010 out of 322 schools listed.

== Schools ==
Schools in the district (with 2020–21 enrollment data from the National Center for Education Statistics) are:

Elementary schools

- Milton Avenue School with 284 students in grades PreK-3
  - Kristen Crawford, principal
- Southern Boulevard School with 414 students in grades K-3
  - Marco Freyre, principal
- Washington Avenue School with 314 students in grades K-3
  - Kristine Dudlo, principal
- Lafayette School with 592 students in grades 4-5
  - Cheryl Russo, principal

Middle school

- Chatham Middle School with 984 students in grades 6-8
  - Aaron Yamamoto, principal

High school

- Chatham High School with 1,315 students in grades 9-12
  - Douglas M. Walker, principal

== Administration ==
Core members of the district's administration are:

- Emily Sortino, superintendent
- Peter Daquila, business administrator and board secretary

In January 2025, the Board of Education promoted Sortino to Superintendent effective July 1, 2025 after Dr. Michael LaSusa resigned to become the Superintendent in Princeton. LaSusa had been the Superintendent for 13 years and left the district after starting in 2001 as a teacher.

== Board of education ==
The district's board of education is composed of nine members, who set policy and oversee the fiscal and educational operation of the district through its administration. As a Type II school district, the board's trustees are elected directly by voters to serve three-year terms of office on a staggered basis, with three seats up for election each year held (since 2016), as part of the November general election. The board appoints a superintendent to oversee the district's day-to-day operations and a business administrator to supervise the business functions of the district. Seats on the board are allocated to the constituent municipalities based on population, with Chatham Township assigned five seats and Chatham Borough assigned four seats.
