= WHPH (New Jersey) =

Radio station in Hanover and Whippany, New Jersey (1966–1986)

Hanover and Whippany, New Jersey; United States
- Broadcast area: Morris County, New Jersey
- Frequencies: 90.5 MHz (7:00 am–2:45 pm, shared with WJSV)

Programming
- Format: Variety

Ownership
- Owner: Hanover Park Regional Board of Education

History
- First air date: April 18, 1966
- Last air date: June 13, 1986
- Call sign meaning: Hanover Park High

Technical information
- Facility ID: 25979
- Class: A
- ERP: 125 watts
- HAAT: 154 meters
- Transmitter coordinates: 40°50′10″N 74°29′16″W

WHPH was a radio station on 90.5 FM in Whippany, New Jersey. It was operated by students in the Hanover Park Regional High School District at Hanover Park High School and Whippany Park High School. The station went on the air in 1966 and closed in 1986 amid budget cuts in the school district.

== History ==
WHPH went on air April 18, 1966, from Hanover Park High School. It broadcast from a transmitter on the Hanover Township Municipal Building with 10 watts on 90.3 MHz, making it a Class D station. The station was the outgrowth of a radio club formed by two math teachers. When it signed on, WHPH broadcast for just over two hours a day on weekdays during the school year—from 7:30 a.m. to 8:15 a.m. and again between 4 p.m. and 5:30 p.m.

The FCC approved an additional station on 90.3 in 1973. That station, WMSC at Montclair State College, would cause some interference in the outer portions of the WHPH coverage area. The school district analyzed making several improvements to the facility, relocating the transmitter, and changing frequencies, though no FCC application would ever be filed for any improvements. Hanover Park fought with Montclair State over the viability of a new co-channel station; East Hanover Township went as far to file a petition to deny on WMSC's application for a new station, while Montclair State pointed to engineering studies that reported that the new WMSC would not create core interference to WHPH. A previous 1971 application for facility improvements was returned due to interference concerns with several stations. However, once WMSC began broadcasting in December 1974, interference concerns did manifest, with reports of WMSC being heard on the same block as WHPH's transmitter site.

In 1970, Whippany Park High School began originating programming for WHPH from a studio on its campus, with the two schools in the district sharing time. By 1977, the station was on the air on school days between 7 a.m. and 5:30 p.m. and for coverage of the schools' home football and hockey games outside of that time, and it also expressed interest in broadcasting East Hanover Township committee sessions.

WHPH also had to contend with a new adjacent-channel station in the 1970s, 90.5 WJSV, belonging to the Morris School District in Morristown. The stations began a hookup in 1972 for coverage of high school athletic events between Morristown and the Hanover Park schools, as well as a joint broadcast of New Jersey election returns.

The late 1970s heralded new challenges for WHPH, relating to new FCC regulations. In 1978, the FCC announced it would cease licensing new Class D stations and encouraged as many as possible to upgrade to "full-service" Class A operation, with an effective radiated power of at least 100 watts. However, there was no room for WHPH to upgrade without entering into an agreement with WJSV, not only for technical reasons but also because of minimum programming requirements of full-service radio stations that would have required WHPH to broadcast for 60 hours a week. As part of the time-share agreement, the two Class D stations filed together to relocate their transmitter to Morris Plains, New Jersey and broadcast with 100 watts; WHPH would broadcast from 6 a.m. to 3 p.m. on weekdays, with WJSV broadcasting from 3 p.m. to 10 p.m. on weekdays as well as on weekends. Eventually, WHPH's air time shifted to 7 a.m. to 2:45 p.m. WHPH also shifted its programming away from rock music, which had been its music format, to include more public service programs. The time-share agreement reduced the output from each of the Hanover Park schools considerably. Prior to moving to 90.5, the two schools each broadcast for eight hours daily two days a week and on alternate Fridays, while by early 1986, each school broadcast for four hours within WHPH's allotted airtime.

A further—and ultimately, decisive—threat for WHPH came from budget cuts by the school board. The Hanover Park Regional Board of Education first considered closing the station down in March 1981. While no action was taken in 1981, it would be in 1986, when the school district slated WHPH for closure amidst budget cuts and a 4.5 percent decline in enrollment, while the district had to spend more on liability insurance and asbestos abatement at Hanover Park High School. Despite warnings that closing WHPH would be an irrevocable act because of the unavailability of FM station space in the region, and proposals from parents to raise funds, the board of education voted against allocating $26,000 for an adviser's salary in June and WHPH was signed off for good on June 13, 1986.

== Notable alumni ==
- Tony Russomanno, reporter, KGO-TV and KPIX-TV
