= WVMS =

WVMS may refer to:

- WVMS (FM), an FM radio station licensed to Sandusky, Ohio; rebroadcaster of Cleveland's WCRF-FM
- WMSC (FM), an FM radio station in Upper Montclair, New Jersey, formerly known as WVMS
- An acronym for Welsh Valley Middle School
