= Paper Mill Playhouse =

Regional theater located in Millburn, New Jersey

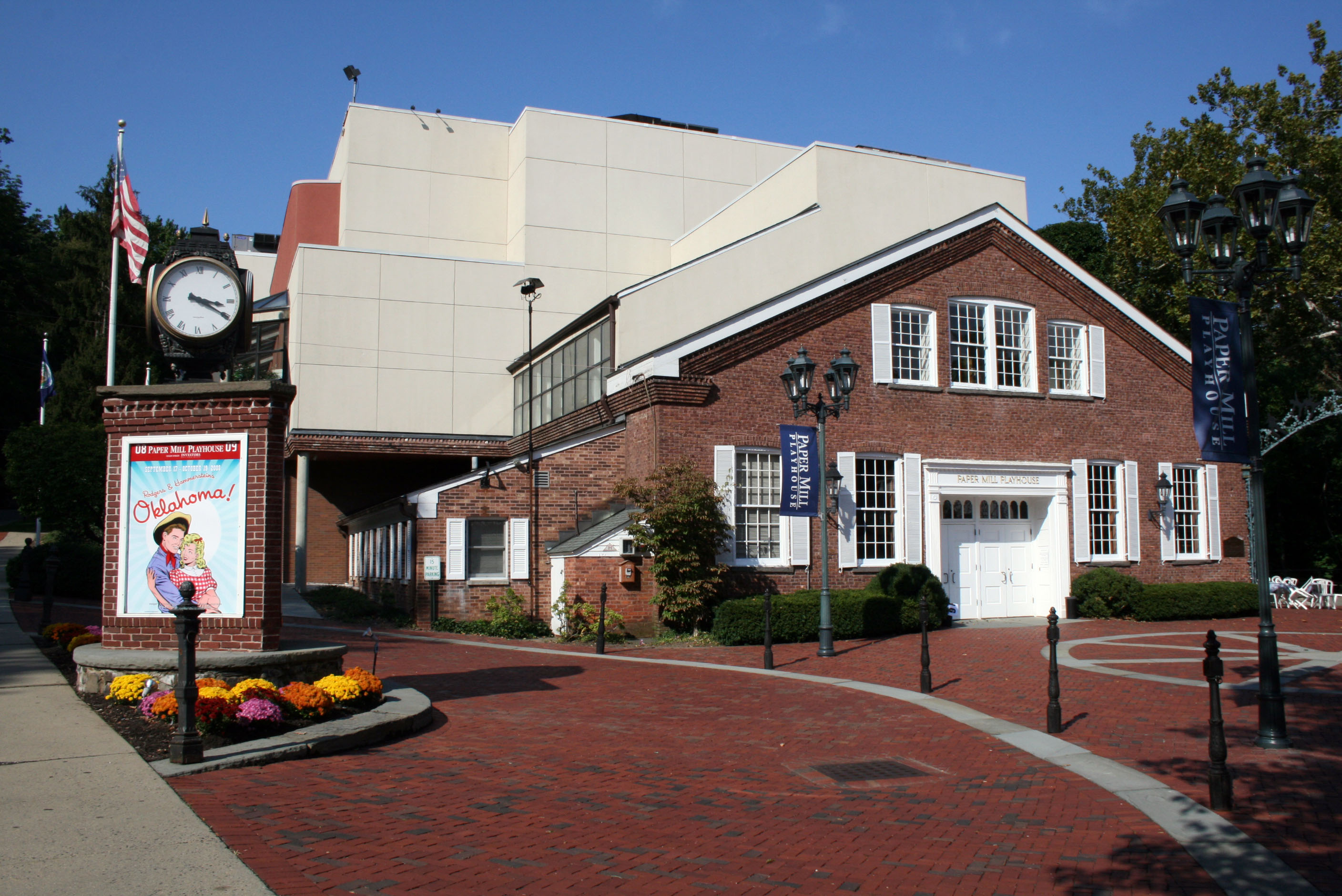
- Main entrance
- Interactive map of Paper Mill Playhouse
- Address: 22 Brookside Drive; Millburn, New Jersey; United States
- Coordinates: 40°43′40″N 74°18′33″W
- Operator: Mark S. Hoebee
- Capacity: 1,200
- Type: Regional theater

Construction
- Opened: 1934
- Years active: 77

Website
- www.papermill.org

Paper Mill Playhouse is a regional theater containing approximately 1,200 seats located in Millburn, within Essex County, New Jersey, United States, on the banks of the Rahway River. Due to its relative proximity to Manhattan, the theater draws from the pool of actors (and audience members) who live in New York City. Paper Mill was officially designated as the "State Theater of New Jersey". From 1971 to 2008, Paper Mill held the New Jersey Ballet as its resident ballet company, with the annual production of Nutcracker until the premiere of the 25th Anniversary tour of Les Misérables took up the ballet's performance slot. Mark S. Hoebee serves as the producing artistic director, and is often credited as saving the Paper Mill during the 2008 financial crisis.

In 2016, the playhouse received the Regional Theatre Tony Award.

== History ==
=== Building ===
In March 1795, Sam Campbell built The Thistle Paper Mill on land along the Rahway River in the town of Millburn. Campbell ran his business for about 20 years until he was forced to close down due to a fire. The building remained vacant for several years and ownership changed several times. In the late 1870s, Diamond Mill Paper Company took over the property and used it for their paper making business until 1928.

Writer and performer Antoinette Scudder, along with actor and director Frank Carrington formed a partnership in the late 1920s to create their own theater. They eventually found the vacant mill, and spent many years working on it, turning it into a theater.

Another fire in 1980 changed the course of the theater, and it closed for rebuilding. On October 30, 1982, the Paper Mill reopened for their first theatrical production since the fire. This period of time became the focal point of a lawsuit between the theater and Millburn on whether or not they would be exempt from property taxes during the time the property was not in use.

=== Theater ===
Founded in 1934, Paper Mill Playhouse raised the curtain on its first performance with Gregorio Martinez Sierra’s The Kingdom of God on November 14, 1938. By the end of the first year, Carrington had coaxed entertainer Irene Castle out of retirement to make her dramatic debut in Noël Coward’s Shadow Play. The first few years featured a variety of classical and modern plays. By 1941, the Playhouse had begun to specialize in operettas, which it continued until the early 1950s.

Change marked this period in Paper Mill’s history, especially with Miss Scudder’s death in 1958. Angelo Del Rossi joined as associate producer in 1964, working closely with Carrington until his death in 1975. Del Rossi became executive producer and remained in that role for nearly 40 years until his death in August 2014.

In 1971, the New Jersey Ballet staged its first production of The Nutcracker at Paper Mill with world-renowned dancer Edward Villella in the role of the Cavalier. The Nutcracker production has been produced annually at Paper Mill since then.

In 1972, Governor of New Jersey William Cahill proclaimed Paper Mill the "Official State Theater of New Jersey." The theater has been cited as a State Center of Artistic Excellence and as a Major Impact and Distinguished Arts Organization by the New Jersey State Council on the Arts.

In 1998 Paper Mill staged a landmark production of Stephen Sondheim's Follies led by music director Tom Helm which Sondheim described as the first staging of the musical to utilize the complete score. The Paper Mill production was later recorded with Follies original orchestrator, Jonathan Tunick, leading the musical forces. Helm also conducted Paper Mill's 1999 production of Crazy for You which was filmed for national broadcast on PBS's Great Performances.

Through the years, Paper Mill Playhouse has welcomed such talent as Christopher Patterson, Gloria Stuart, Alice Ripley, Eddie Bracken, Laura Benanti (Rising Star Award winner), Orson Bean, Betty Buckley, Carol Channing, Kristin Chenoweth, Christine Ebersole, George S. Irving, Tiffany Giardina, Laurence Guittard, Anne Hathaway (Paper Mill Conservatory alumna and Rising Star Award nominee), Shanice Williams (Paper Mill Conservatory alumna, Rising Star Award nominee, and Adopt-A-School participant), Dee Hoty, John Mahoney, Dorothy Louden, Donna McKechnie, Ann Miller, Stephanie Mills, Liza Minnelli, Estelle Parsons, Bernadette Peters, Chita Rivera, Tony Roberts, Ali Brustofski, Patrick Swayze, Karen Ziemba, Adrian Zmed, Nick Jonas (actor, singer and member of the band the Jonas Brothers), Bailey Hanks (the winner of Legally Blonde: The Musical – The Search for Elle Woods), Lynn Redgrave, Lorna Luft, David Garrison, Douglas Fairbanks Jr., Mickey Rooney, Barbara Rush, Betsy Palmer, Robert Horton, Vivian Vance, Jerome Hines, Sarah Hyland, Shelley Winters, Hugh O'Brian, Gloria Swanson, Georgia Engel, and Gavin Lee among many.

In April 2003, Michael Gennaro, former executive director of Chicago's Steppenwolf Theater, joined Paper Mill as president and CEO. Paper Mill Playhouse was one of the first theaters to begin the regional theater movement in the United States. It has grown to become one of the most acclaimed not-for-profit professional theaters in the country, attracting more than 450,000 people annually, and has one of the largest subscription based audiences.

=== Financial issues ===
On April 3, 2007, Paper Mill announced that it would need $1.5 million to open its season and an equal amount to complete its season, or it would be forced to close its doors. On April 6, 2007, Paper Mill announced that it had received $300,000, enough to cover costs of rehearsals and preview performances for its production of Seven Brides for Seven Brothers.

Paper Mill announced that it would have to do more well-known shows to stay in business. On June 17, 2008, the Township of Millburn voted to purchase the building and four acres of land the Paper Mill sits on for $9 million. They have entered into a 75-year lease with the theater; and its operations will remain independent. Prior to this deal the Paper Mill had accumulated $4.5 million in debt. Based on the terms of the lease, the Paper Mill would pay $1 for the first two years. After 2 years the rent would grow to equal 1% of the theater's annual operation income. The Paper Mill maintained an option to repurchase the property from the town after 11 years of the lease. The artistic director at the time, Mark S. Hoebee, is attributed with saving the Paper Mill.

=== Seasons ===
World premiere	US premiere	East coast premiere	Planned but cancelled due to COVID-19	Tryout, not a premiere

Season	Show 1	Show 2	Show 3	Show 4	Show 5	Show 6
1992–1993	The Wizard of Oz	Sweeney Todd: The Demon Barber of Fleet Street	Don't Dress for Dinner	Lost In Yonkers	My Fair Lady	Phantom
1993–1994	Paper Moon	Animal Crackers	South Pacific	Singin' in the Rain	Peter Pan	
1994–1995	Forever Plaid	Oliver!	Brigadoon	The Secret Garden		
1995–1996	Nine	Dreamgirls	You Never Know	Comfortable Shoes	Call Me Madam	Evita
1996–1997	Applause	Gigi	No, No, Nanette	Man of La Mancha		
1997–1998	Big River	Children of Eden	The Mask of Moriarty	Death of a Salesman	Follies	The Will Rogers Follies
1998–1999	Gypsy	Jekyll & Hyde	Up, Up, and Away	Wuthering Heights	Crazy for You	Joseph and the Amazing Technicolor Dreamcoat
1999–2000	Mame	Rags	Noises Off	Deathtrap	The Student Prince	Pippin
2000–2001	Anything Goes	Victor/Victoria	Art	An Ideal Husband	Funny Girl	Carousel
2001–2002	A Chorus Line	Red, Hot and Blue	The Dinner Party	I'm Not Rappaport	The King and I	My Fair Lady
2002–2003	Miss Saigon	Annie	Blue	Romeo and Bernadette	Camelot	Grease
2003–2004	Ain't Misbehavin'	The Sound of Music	The Tale of the Allergist's Wife	The Chosen	Baby	Guys and Dolls
2004–2005	Of Thee I Sing	She Loves Me	The Drawer Boy	Harold and Maude	The Baker's Wife	Ragtime
2005–2006	Cinderella	The Diary of Anne Frank	Carnival!	A Midsummer Night's Dream	Hello Dolly!	
2006–2007	Godspell	A Wonderful Life	Summer and Smoke	Romance/Romance	Seven Brides for Seven Brothers	Pirates!
2007–2008	Happy Days: The Musical	Meet Me in St. Louis	The Miracle Worker	Steel Magnolias	Kiss Me, Kate	Little Shop of Horrors
2008–2009	Oklahoma!	High School Musical	The Importance of Being Earnest	Master Class	1776	The Full Monty
2009–2010	Little House on the Prairie	On the Town	Lost in Yonkers	Smokey Joe's Cafe	Peter Pan	
2010–2011	Hairspray	Les Misérables	The 25th Annual Putnam County Spelling Bee	A Funny Thing Happened on the Way to the Forum	Curtains	
2011–2012	Newsies	White Christmas	Boeing-Boeing	Damn Yankees	Once on This Island	
2012–2013	A Chorus Line	The Sound of Music	Lend Me a Tenor	Thoroughly Modern Millie	The Little Mermaid	
2013–2014	Honeymoon in Vegas	Oliver!	The Other Josh Cohen	South Pacific	Grease	
2014–2015	Can-Can	Elf	Vanya and Sonia and Masha and Spike	The Hunchback of Notre Dame	Ever After The Musical	
2015–2016	Bandstand	A Christmas Story: The Musical	A Bronx Tale	Pump Boys and Dinettes	West Side Story	
2016–2017	The Producers	The Bodyguard	A Comedy of Tenors	Million Dollar Quartet	Mary Poppins	
2017–2018	The Honeymooners	Annie	The Outsider	The Sting	Half Time	
2018–2019	The Color Purple	Holiday Inn	My Very Own British Invasion	Benny & Joon	Beauty and the Beast	
2019–2020	Chasing Rainbows: The Road to Oz	Cinderella	Unmasked	Sister Act	The Wanderer	
2020-2021	Clue	The Sound of Music	Aida	The Wanderer	Bruce	
2021-2022	Songs for a New World	Jolly Holiday- Celebrating Disney's Broadway Hits	Clue	The Wanderer	Sister Act	
2022-2023	On Your Feet!	The Sound of Music	Hercules	Murder on the Orient Express	RENT	
2023-2024	The Great Gatsby: A New Musical	Fiddler on the Roof	After Midnight	Gun & Powder	Beautiful: The Carole King Musical	
2024-2025	Jersey Boys	Irving Berlin's White Christmas	Mystic Pizza	Take the Lead	The Little Mermaid	
2025-2026	Bull Durham	Frozen	Come from Away	1776	West Side Story	
2026-2027	Mary Poppins	Lend Me a Tenor	Million Dollar Quartet	Dear Evan Hansen		

== Affiliations ==
Paper Mill is a member of the Council of Stock Theatres (COST), a group of theaters who join to negotiate with the various unions that are involved in stage productions. COST's contract with Actors' Equity allows for a minimum weekly salary which is smaller than what Broadway productions must pay their actors; Paper Mill is also allowed to cast a minimal amount of non-union actors, which is forbidden for Broadway shows. This gives Paper Mill the ability to produce shows on a larger scale than most Broadway productions (and in a shorter amount of time).

It is a member company of the New Jersey Theatre Alliance.

== Educational programs ==
Paper Mill also has a large theater school offering a variety of classes. They have also run classes for developmentally disabled students with VSA New Jersey.

== Rising Star Awards ==
Starting in 1996, the Paper Mill holds annual Rising Star Awards (modeled after the Tony Awards) every spring, honoring excellence in high school theater performances across the state of New Jersey

=== Award recipients ===
Year	Outstanding Overall Production of a Musical	Outstanding Leading Performer in a Female-Identified Role	Outstanding Leading Performer in a Male-Identified Role	Outstanding Supporting Performer in a Female-Identified Role	Outstanding Supporting Performer in a Male-Identified Role	Outstanding Performer in a Featured Role	Outstanding Performance by a Featured Ensemble Member	Outstanding Performance by a Featured Ensemble Group	Outstanding Performance by a Chorus	Outstanding Performance by an Orchestra	Outstanding Achievement by a Teacher or Outside Director	Outstanding Achievement in Choreography and Staging	Outstanding Achievement in Music Direction (music director)	Outstanding Scenic Achievement	Outstanding Lighting Achievement	Outstanding Costuming Achievement	Outstanding Hair and Make-Up Achievement	Educational Impact Award	Rising Star “Theatre for Everyone” Inclusion and Access Award
2016	Summit High School - Mary Poppins	Claire Fitzpatrick as "Mary Poppins" - Summit High School - Mary Poppins	Trevor Braun as "Charlie Chaplin" - Fair Lawn High School - Chaplin The Musical	Jazmin Palmer as "Fraulein Schneider" - Pingry School - Cabaret	Ross Turkington as "Cookie McGee" - Montclair Kimberley Academy - Nice Work If You Can Get It	Eric Judson as "Paul" - West Windsor-Plainsboro High School South - A Chorus Line	Greg Lobo as "Big Jule" - Bernards High School - Guys and Dolls	"The Silly Girls" - Columbia High School - Disney's Beauty and the Beast	Academy of the Holy Angels - Children of Eden	West Morris Central High School - In the Heights	Katie McSherry - Academy of the Holy Angels - Children of Eden	Jennifer Williams - Union High School - Mary Poppins	George Croom - Academy of the Holy Angels - Children of Eden	Robert Vendetti - Passaic County Technical Institute - Man of La Manch	Sharp Edge Lighting Design - Westfield High School - Into the Woods	Katherine Winter - Summit High School - Mary Poppins	Celine Lockman, Fiona Kniaz, Alex Salvitti, Angela Colo, and Gina Freshcoln - Clearview Regional High School - The Addams Family	St. Joseph Regional High School - Urinetown	Morristown High School - Once Upon a Mattress
2017	Eastern Regional High School - Les Misérables: School Edition	Khailah Johnson as “Deloris van Cartier” - Franklin High School - Sister Act	Gary Bowman as “Jean Valjean” - Eastern Regional High School - Les Misérables: School Edition	Alana Kopelove as “Little Sally” - Gloucester County Institute of Technology - Urinetown	Will Higgins as “Nathan Detroit” - Montclair Kimberley Academy - Guys and Dolls	Shane Daneyko as “Chef Louis” - West Essex High School - Disney's The Little Mermaid	Rachel Maselek as “Little Becky Two Shoes” - Gloucester County Institute of Technology - Urinetown	"The Rebel Poor" - Gloucester County Institute of Technology - Urinetown	Academy of the Holy Angels - The Mystery of Edwin Drood	Union High School - Cinderella	Dr. Gregg Molotsky - Eastern Regional High School - Les Misérables: School Edition	Jensyn Modero - Mount Saint Dominic Academy - 42nd Street	James Mosser and Laura Muller - Union High School - Cinderella	Jason M. Stewart - Ridge High School - Fiddler On The Roof	Christopher Annas-Lee - Union High School - Cinderella	Katherine Winter - Summit High School - How to Succeed In Business Without Really Trying	Catherine O'Brien - Mount Saint Dominic Academy - 42nd Street	Fair Lawn High School - Bloody Bloody Andrew Jackson	Morristown High School - Legally Blonde
2018	Union High School - Peter Pan	Mira Mookerjee as “Lilli Vanessi / Katharine” - Moorestown High School Kiss Me, Kate	Jovanni Aparicio as “Usnavi” - Carteret High School - In The Heights	Caroline Herbert as “The Chaperone” - Hopewell Valley Central High School - The Drowsy Chaperone	Matthew Losco as “Igor” - Vernon Township High School - Young Frankenstein Nick Scafuto as “J. Bowden Hapgood” - Bridgewater-Raritan High School - Anyone Can Whistle	Alyssa Carbonell as “Tiger Lily” - Union High School - Peter Pan	Joshua Nilsen as “Eugene Florczyk” - Delaware Valley Regional High School - Greece	"The Lost Boys" - Union High School - Peter Pan	Princeton Day School - Bat Boy the Musical	Fair Lawn High School - Once	Jeff Hogan - West Morris Central High School - The Pirate Queen	Jennifer Williams - Union High School - Peter Pan	Charles Santoro - Fair Lawn High School - Once	Jamie Allaire - Jackson Memorial High School - Disney's Beauty And The Beast	Coby Chasman-Beck - Union High School - Peter Pan	Barbara Canace, Carol Rutledge, and Suzanna Roghanchi - Columbia High School - Hairspray Katie Adams - Morristown High School - Anything Goes	Danielle Garritt and Keleyn Wraga - Toms River High School North - The Addams Family	Summit High School -Legally Blonde	Madison High School - Footloose
2019	Madison High School - Bright Star	Kassi McMillan as “Alice Murphy” - St. Joseph Regional High School - Bright Star	Jaron Cole as “Jimmy Ray Dobbs” - Madison High School - Bright Star	Alex Mroczko as “Margo Crawford” - Madison High School - Bright Star	Joseph Grisanzio as “Adolpho”, Howell High School - Drowsy Chaperone	Sara Bartoszek as “Peron’s Mistress”, High Tech High School - Evita	Abigail Montesino as “Grace”, Fair Lawn High School - Working	"Dance Hall Girls" - Westfield High School - Sweet Charity	Summit High School - Pippin	Summit High School - Pippin	Blake Spence - Madison High School - Bright Star	Summit High School - Pippin	Summit High School - Pippin	Madison High School - Bright Star	Harrison High School - James & The Giant Peach	Harrison High School - James & The Giant Peach	Harrison High School - James & The Giant Peach	Perth Amboy High School - 9 to 5	Carteret High School - Footloose
2022	Ridge High School - Matilda	Libby Schmitt as “Matilda” - Ridge High School -Matilda	Elliot Block as “Edward Bloom” - Hopewell Valley Central High School - Big Fish	Rachel Vanek as “Miss Honey” - Ridge High School - Matilda	Jayden White as “Chip Tolentino” - Ewing High School - The 25th Annual Putnam County Spelling Bee Oscar Grob as “Mr. Wormwood” - Ridge High School - Matilda	Elliot Newman as “Bobby” - Oakcrest High School - Memphis	Gabriel Subervi as “Doctor and Escapologist” - Ridge High School Matilda	"The Dance Hall Girls" - Morristown-Beard School - Sweet Charity	Ridge High School - Matilda	Carteret High School Chicago: High School Edition	Martha Harvey - Ridge High School - Matilda	Tricia Benn and Bethany Pettigrew - Columbia High School - Newsies	Romel McInnis and Diana Gable - Clearview Regional High School - The Hunchback of Notre Dame	Louis J. Medrano - Columbia High School - Newsies	Colin Shields - Harrison High School - The Apple Tree	Sabrina Windt and Matt DiDonato - Haddonfield Memorial High School - Rodgers And Hammerstein’s Cinderella	Colin Shields - Harrison High School - The Apple Tree	Christian Brothers Academy - 13	Moorestown High School - Honk!
2023	Ridge High School - Newsies	Leah Rose Crossan as “Donna Sheridan” - Clearview Regional High School - Mamma Mia!	Dakota Krouse as “Gomez Addams” - Delaware Valley Regional High School - The Addams Family	Ryan Yuhas as “Ursula” - Sayreville War Memorial High School - The Little Mermaid	Zach Siegel as “Nigel Bottom” - Summit High School - Something Rotten!	Mac Silverstein as “Brother Jeremiah” - Columbia High School - Something Rotten! Elijah Dor as George - Morris Knolls High School - The Drowsy Chaperone Amanda Muldowney as Annie Reilly - Southern Regional High School - 42nd Street	Jaidyn Riley as “Mush” - Ridge High School - Newsies	The Troupe - Summit High School - Something Rotten!	Ridge High School - Newsies	Ridge High School - Newsies	Clinton Ambs - Delaware Valley Regional High School - The Addams Family	Rachel Miranda, Jennifer Digiuseppe - Ridge High School - Newsies	John Brzozowski - Westfield High School - Sunday In The Park With George	Anthony Freitas - Madison High School - Little Women	Michael Kimmel, Lisa Weinshrott - Wallkill Valley Regional High School - The Wizard of OZ	Sabrina Windt - Haddonfield Memorial High School - Head Over Heels	Carrie Snodgrass - Delaware Valley Regional High School - The Addams Family	Cedar Grove High School - The Prom Jonathan Dayton High School - Heathers: School Edition	Eastern Regional High School - Frozen Moorestown High School - Rodgers & Hammerstein’s Cinderella
