= Cold Steel =

Cold Steel may refer to:

- Cold-formed steel (CFS), the common term for products made by rolling or pressing thin gauges of sheet steel into goods
- Cold Steel (company), marketer of knives, swords and other edged weapons and tools

== Media ==
=== Film ===
- Cold Steel (1921 film), an American silent film directed by Sherwood MacDonald
- Cold Steel (1987 film), an American thriller film directed by Dorothy Ann Puzo
- Cold Steel (2011 film), a Chinese action film directed by David Wu

=== Literature ===
- Cold Steel, an 1899 novel by M. P. Shiel
- Cold Steel, a 1988 novel attributed to Dick Stivers; the 38th installment in the Able Team series
- Cold Steele, a 1989 novel by J. D. Masters; the second installment in the Donovan Steele series
- Cold Steel, a 2002 novel by J. Steven York, the ninth installment in the Bolo series
- Cold Steel, a 2013 novel by Kate Elliott; the third installment in the Spiritwalker trilogy
- Cold Steele, a 2019 novel by Kimberly Amato

=== Television ===
- "Cold Steel", Mega Man season 1, episode 11 (1994)
- "Cold Steel", Tales of the Vikings episode 20 (1960)
- "Cold Steel" (The Punisher), an episode of The Punisher

=== Video games ===
- The Legend of Heroes: Trails of Cold Steel, a video game series
