= List of Alpha Epsilon Rho chapters =

Alpha Epsilon Rho (AERho) is an international scholastic honor society recognizing academic achievement among students in the field of electronic media. Originally, AERho chapters were assigned names according to the Greek alphabet. Greek letter chapter names were dropped when AERho changed from a recognition society to a professional society in 1975.

In the following list of chapters, active chapters are indicated in bold and inactive chapters and institutions are in italics. Status is as of June 2010.

Chapter	Charter date and range	Institution	Location	Status	Ref.
Alpha	April 30, 1943 – before June 2010	Stephens College	Columbia, Missouri	Inactive	
Beta	1943–before June 2010	Syracuse University	Syracuse, New York	Inactive	
Gamma	1943–before 1977	University of Minnesota	Minneapolis, Minnesota	Inactive	
Delta	1943–1957	Michigan State University	East Lansing, Michigan	Inactive	
Epsilon	1943–before 1977	Ohio State University	Columbus, Ohio	Inactive	
Zeta	1945–1946	Siena Heights University	Adrian, Michigan	Inactive	
Eta	1945–before June 2010	University of Alabama	Tuscaloosa, Alabama	Inactive	
**Theta**	1945–before 1977; xxxx ?	University of Oklahoma	Norman, Oklahoma	Active	
Iota	1946–1958	University of Utah	Salt Lake City, Utah	Inactive	
Kappa	1946–1950	Cornell University	Ithaca, New York	Inactive	
Lambda	1946–1952	Purdue University	West Lafayette, Indiana	Inactive	
**Mu**	1946–1958; xxxx ?	University of Nebraska–Lincoln	Lincoln, Nebraska	Active	
Nu				Inactive	
**Xi**	1946–1961; xxxx ?	Miami University	Oxford, Ohio	Active	
Omicron	1947–before 1977	Brigham Young University	Provo, Utah	Inactive	
Pi	1947–1959	Baylor University	Waco, Texas	Inactive	
Rho	1948–1960	Shurtleff College	Alton, Illinois	Inactive	
Sigma				Inactive	
**Tau**	1948	Lindenwood University	St. Charles, Missouri	Active	
Upsilon	1948–1958	University of Arkansas	Fayetteville, Arkansas	Inactive	
Phi	1948–before 1977	University of Texas at Austin	Austin, Texas	Inactive	
Chi	1949–before 1977	Texas Western University	El Paso, Texas	Inactive	
Psi	1959–before 1977	Boston University	Boston, Massachusetts	Inactive	
Omega	1950–before 1977	University of Miami	Coral Gables, Florida	Inactive	
Alpha Alpha	1958–1960	Butler University Jordan College of Music	Indianapolis, Indiana	Inactive	
Alpha Beta	1950–before 1977	University of Florida	Gainesville, Florida	Inactive	
Alpha Gamma	1950–before 1977	Ohio Wesleyan University	Delaware, Ohio	Inactive	
Alpha Delta	1950–1960	Gunnison Chapel (St. Lawrence University)	Canton, New York	Inactive	
Alpha Epsilon	1952–before 1977	University of the Pacific	Stockton, California	Inactive	
Alpha Zeta	1952–1958	Emporia State University	Emporia, Kansas	Inactive	
Alpha Eta	1952–before June 2010	Kansas State University	Manhattan, Kansas	Inactive	
Alpha Theta	1953–1957	University of Evansville	Evansville, Indiana	Inactive	
Alpha Iota ?	1956–before June 2010	University of Kentucky	Lexington, Kentucky	Inactive	
Alpha Kappa	1953–before 1977	Millikin University	Decatur, Illinois	Inactive	
Alpha Lambda	1953–before 1977	Eastern Illinois University	Charleston, Illinois	Inactive	
Alpha Mu	1954–before June 2010	University of Southern California	Los Angeles, California	Inactive	
Alpha Nu	1955–before 1977	Texas Christian University	Fort Worth, Texas	Inactive	
Alpha Xi	1959–before 1977	Ohio University	Athens, Ohio	Inactive	
Alpha Omicron	1958–before June 2010	San Diego State University	San Diego, California	Inactive	
Alpha Pi	1959–before 1977	Wayne State University	Detroit, Michigan	Inactive	(Note: Chapter formed from the Radio Guild, a local group established in 1946.)
Alpha Rho	1959–before 1977	University of California, Los Angeles	Los Angeles, California	Inactive	
Alpha Sigma	1959–before June 2010	University of Tulsa	Tulsa, Oklahoma	Inactive	
Alpha Tau ?	1958–before June 2010	University of Washington	Seattle, Washington	Inactive	
Alpha Upsilon	1959–before 1977	San Francisco State University	San Francisco, California	Inactive	
Alpha Phi	1958–before 1977	University of Houston	Houston, Texas	Inactive	
Alpha Chi				Inactive	
Alpha Psi	1959–before June 2010	University of Kansas	Lawrence, Kansas	Inactive	
Alpha Omega	1960–before June 2010	Ithaca College	Ithaca, New York	Inactive	
Beta Alpha	1960–before June 2010	Murray State University	Murray, Kentucky	Inactive	
	1965–before June 2010	Detroit		Inactive	
	1967–before June 2010	California State University, Long Beach	Long Beach, California	Inactive	
	1968–before June 2010	Southern Illinois University Carbondale	Carbondale, Illinois	Inactive	
	1969	Central Missouri State University	Warrensburg, Missouri	Active	
	1969–before June 2010	Memphis State University	Memphis, Tennessee	Inactive	
	1970–before June 2010	San Bernardino Valley College	San Bernardino, California	Inactive	
	1970–before June 2010	University of South Carolina	Columbia, South Carolina	Inactive	
	1970–before June 2010	Texas Tech University	Lubbock, Texas	Inactive	
	1970	University of Wisconsin–Oshkosh	Oshkosh, Wisconsin	Active	
	1971–before June 2010	Arizona State University	Tempe, Arizona	Inactive	
	1971	CUNY Brooklyn College	Brooklyn, New York City, New York	Active	
	1971–before June 2010	South Carolina Professional Chapter	South Carolina	Inactive	
	1972	Central Michigan University	Mount Pleasant, Michigan	Active	
	1972	State University of New York at Oswego	Oswego, New York	Active	
	1973–before June 2010	California State University, Northridge	Los Angeles, California	Inactive	
	1973	Indiana		Active	
	1973	Oklahoma State University–Stillwater	Stillwater, Oklahoma	Active	
	1974–before June 2010	Delta State University	Cleveland, Mississippi	Inactive	
	1974–before June 2010	Northeast Louisiana University	Monroe, Louisiana	Inactive	
	1975	Morehead State University	Morehead, Kentucky	Active	
	1975–before June 2010	New York University	New York City, New York	Inactive	
	1975–before June 2010	Northern Illinois University	DeKalb, Illinois	Inactive	
	1976–before June 2010	Arkansas State University	Jonesboro, Arkansas	Inactive	
	1976–before June 2010	Auburn University	Auburn, Alabama	Inactive	
	1976–before June 2010	Rowan College of New Jersey	Glassboro, New Jersey	Inactive	
	1976–before June 2010	James Madison University	Harrisonburg, Virginia	Inactive	
	1976	Norfolk State University	Norfolk, Virginia	Active	
	1976–before June 2010	State University of New York at Buffalo	Buffalo, New York	Inactive	
	1976–before June 2010	Shaw University	Raleigh, North Carolina	Inactive	
	1976–before June 2010	Southwest Texas State University	San Marcos, Texas	Inactive	
	1976–before June 2010	Virginia Tech	Blacksburg, Virginia	Inactive	
	1976–before June 2010	Winthrop University	Rock Hill, South Carolina	Inactive	
	1976–before June 2010	St. Clair County Community College	Port Huron, Michigan	Inactive	
	1977–before June 2010	Appalachian State University	Boone, North Carolina	Inactive	
	1977–before June 2010	University of Arkansas at Little Rock	Little Rock, Arkansas	Inactive	
	1977–before June 2010	Black Hawk College	Moline, Illinois	Inactive	
	1977–before June 2010	Boston College	Chestnut Hill, Massachusetts	Inactive	
	1977	University of Cincinnati	Cincinnati, Ohio	Active	
	1977	Gannon University	Erie, Pennsylvania	Active	
	1977–before June 2010	Towson University	Towson, Maryland	Inactive	
	1977–before June 2010	Youngstown State University	Youngstown, Ohio	Inactive	
	xxxx ?–before June 2010	Abilene Christian University	Abilene, Texas	Inactive	
		Alcorn State University	Lorman, Mississippi	Active	
		Austin Peay State University	Clarksville, Tennessee	Active	
		Belmont University	Nashville, Tennessee	Active	
		Bloomsburg University of Pennsylvania	Bloomsburg, Pennsylvania	Active	
		Central Washington University	Ellensburg, Washington	Active	
		Claflin University	Orangeburg, South Carolina	Active	
		Clarion University of Pennsylvania	Clarion, Pennsylvania	Active	
		East Carolina University	Greenville, North Carolina	Active	
		Emerson College	Boston, Massachusetts	Active	
		Freed–Hardeman University	Henderson, Tennessee	Active	
		Frostburg State University	Frostburg, Maryland	Active	
		Harding University	Searcy, Arkansas	Active	
	xxxx ?–before June 2010	Hofstra University	Hempstead, New York	Inactive	
		Indiana University of Pennsylvania	Indiana, Pennsylvania	Active	
		Indiana University–Purdue University Indianapolis	Indianapolis, Indiana	Inactive	(Note: In 2024, IUPUI split into two separate universities, Indiana University Indianapolis and Purdue University in Indianapolis.)
		Kutztown University of Pennsylvania	Kutztown, Pennsylvania	Active	
		Lynn University	Boca Raton, Florida	Active	
		Marietta College	Marietta, Ohio	Active	
		Marshall University	Huntington, West Virginia	Active	
		Mercyhurst University	Erie, Pennsylvania	Active	
		Millersville University of Pennsylvania	Millersville, Pennsylvania	Active	
		Missouri Southern State University	Joplin, Missouri	Active	
		Monmouth University	Long Branch, New Jersey	Active	
		Newberry College	Newberry, South Carolina	Active	
		Northern Kentucky University	Highland Heights, Kentucky	Active	
	xxxx ?–before June 2010	Ohio Northern University	Ada, Ohio	Inactive	
		Oklahoma Christian University	Oklahoma City, Oklahoma	Active	
		Rider University	Lawrence Township, New Jersey	Active	
		St. Thomas Aquinas College	Sparkill, New York	Active	
		Salisbury University	Salisbury, Maryland	Active	
		Sam Houston State University	Huntsville, Texas	Active	
		Samford University	Birmingham, Alabama	Active	
		Shippensburg University of Pennsylvania	Shippensburg, Pennsylvania	Active	
		Southeast Missouri State University	Cape Girardeau, Missouri	Active	
	xxxx ?–before June 2010	Southeastern Louisiana University	Hammond, Louisiana	Inactive	
	xxxx ?–before June 2010	Southeastern Oklahoma State University	Durant, Oklahoma	Inactive	
		Southwest Minnesota State University	Marshall, Minnesota	Active	
		State University of New York at Plattsburgh	Plattsburgh, New York	Active	
		Stephen F. Austin State University	Nacogdoches, Texas	Active	
		Tennessee State University	Nashville, Tennessee	Active	
		Texas A&M University–Commerce	Commerce, Texas	Active	
		Texas State University	San Marcos, Texas	Active	
		Troy University	Troy, Alabama	Active	
		Truman State University	Kirksville, Missouri	Active	
		Union University	Jackson, Tennessee	Active	
		University of Central Florida	Orlando, Florida	Active	
		University of Montevallo	Montevallo, Alabama	Active	
		University of Nebraska Omaha	Omaha, Nebraska	Active	
		University of North Alabama	Florence, Alabama	Active	
		University of North Carolina at Chapel Hill	Chapel Hill, North Carolina	Active	
		University of Oregon	Eugene, Oregon	Active	
		University of Tennessee	Knoxville, Tennessee	Active	
		University of Wisconsin–Platteville	Platteville, Wisconsin	Active	
	xxxx ?–before June 2010	Valdosta State University	Valdosta, Georgia	Inactive	
		Weber State University	Ogden, Utah	Active	
		West Texas A&M University	Canyon, Texas	Active	
		West Virginia State University	Institute, West Virginia	Active	
		Western Illinois University	Macomb, Illinois	Active	
		Winona State University	Winona, Minnesota	Active	
