= Harding Township School District =

School district in Morris County, New Jersey, US

Address
- 34 Lee's Hill Road Harding Township, Morris County, New Jersey, 07976; United States
- Coordinates: 40.743601°N 74.477637°W

District information
- Grades: PreK-8
- Superintendent: Matthew A. Spelker
- Business administrator: John Jennings
- Schools: 1

Students and staff
- Enrollment: 291 (as of 2022–23)
- Faculty: 44.3 FTEs
- Student–teacher ratio: 6.6:1

Other information
- District Factor Group: J
- Website: www.hardingtwp.org
Ind.	Per pupil	District spending	Rank (*)	K-8 average	%± vs. average
1A	Total Spending	$23,329	60	$18,891	23.5%
1	Budgetary Cost	20,405	62	14,159	44.1%
2	Classroom Instruction	10,443	51	8,659	20.6%
6	Support Services	3,566	58	2,167	64.6%
8	Administrative Cost	1,735	44	1,547	12.2%
10	Operations & Maintenance	2,855	63	1,612	77.1%
13	Extracurricular Activities	460	66	104	342.3%
16	Median Teacher Salary	61,040	51	61,136
Data from NJDoE 2014 Taxpayers' Guide to Education Spending. *Of K-8 districts with up to 400 students. Lowest spending=1; Highest=71

The Harding Township School District is a community public school district that serves students in pre-kindergarten through eighth grade from Harding Township, in Morris County, in the U.S. state of New Jersey.

As of the 2022–23 school year, the district, comprising one school, had an enrollment of 291 students and 44.3 classroom teachers (on an FTE basis), for a student–teacher ratio of 6.6:1.

The district is classified by the New Jersey Department of Education as being in District Factor Group "J", the-highest of eight groupings. District Factor Groups organize districts statewide to allow comparison by common socioeconomic characteristics of the local districts. From lowest socioeconomic status to highest, the categories are A, B, CD, DE, FG, GH, I and J.

For ninth through twelfth grades, public school students attend Madison High School in Madison, as part of a sending/receiving relationship with the Madison Public Schools. As of the 2021–22 school year, the high school had an enrollment of 839 students and 69.6 classroom teachers (on an FTE basis), for a student–teacher ratio of 12.1:1.

== History ==
In May 1974, the Harding Township School District was given permission by the State Commissioner of Education to end their sending / receiving relationship with the Morris School District at Morristown High School and begin sending their students to Madison High School starting with the 1975-76 school year, ruling that the withdrawal of the mostly white students from Harding Township would not "cause a disproportionate change in the racial composition of Morristown High School".

== School ==
Harding Township School serves students in grades PreK-8. The school had an enrollment of 293 students as of the 2021–22 school year.

- April Friedman, principal and director of curriculum

== Notable alumni ==
- Meryl Streep (born 1949, graduated in 1963), actress.

== Administration ==
Core members of the district's administration are:

- Matthew A. Spelker, superintendent
- John Jennings, business administrator and board secretary

== Board of education ==
The district's board of education is comprised of five members who set policy and oversee the fiscal and educational operation of the district through its administration. As a Type II school district, the board's trustees are elected directly by voters to serve three-year terms of office on a staggered basis, with either one or two seats up for election each year held (since 2012) as part of the November general election. One board member is assigned to serve as a representative to the board of education of the Madison Public Schools. The board appoints a superintendent to oversee the district's day-to-day operations and a business administrator to supervise the business functions of the district.
