= Morris Plains Schools =

School district in Morris County, New Jersey, US

Address
- 500 Speedwell Avenue Morris Plains, Morris County, New Jersey, 07950; United States
- Coordinates: 40.82556°N 74.480366°W

District information
- Grades: pre-K to 8
- Superintendent: Mark Maire
- Business administrator: Catherine Jenisch
- Schools: 2

Students and staff
- Enrollment: 601 (as of 2023–24)
- Faculty: 66.3 FTEs
- Student–teacher ratio: 9.1:1

Other information
- District Factor Group: I
- Website: sites.google.com/mpsdk8.org/mpsdk8/home
Ind.	Per pupil	District spending	Rank (*)	K-8 average	%± vs. average
1A	Total Spending	$18,840	38	$18,891	−0.3%
1	Budgetary Cost	14,542	34	14,159	2.7%
2	Classroom Instruction	8,176	24	8,659	−5.6%
6	Support Services	2,415	39	2,167	11.4%
8	Administrative Cost	1,898	58	1,547	22.7%
10	Operations & Maintenance	1,859	52	1,612	15.3%
13	Extracurricular Activities	177	47	104	70.2%
16	Median Teacher Salary	57,874	23	61,136
Data from NJDoE 2014 Taxpayers' Guide to Education Spending. *Of K-8 districts with 401-750 students. Lowest spending=1; Highest=64

The Morris Plains Schools is a comprehensive community public school district that educates students from pre-kindergarten through eighth grade from Morris Plains, in Morris County, in the U.S. state of New Jersey.

As of the 2023–24 school year, the district, comprised of two schools, had an enrollment of 601 students and 66.3 classroom teachers (on an FTE basis), for a student–teacher ratio of 9.1:1.

The district participates in the Interdistrict Public School Choice Program, which allows non-resident students to attend school in the district at no cost to their parents, with tuition covered by the resident district. Available slots are announced annually by grade.

The district had been classified by the New Jersey Department of Education as being in District Factor Group "I", the second-highest of eight groupings. District Factor Groups organize districts statewide to allow comparison by common socioeconomic characteristics of the local districts. From lowest socioeconomic status to highest, the categories are A, B, CD, DE, FG, GH, I and J.

Students in public school for ninth through twelfth grades attend Morristown High School, as part of a sending/receiving relationship with the Morris School District, which also serves the communities of Morristown and Morris Township (for grades K-12). As of the 2023–24 school year, the high school had an enrollment of 1,856 students and 137.6 classroom teachers (on an FTE basis), for a student–teacher ratio of 13.5:1.

== Schools ==
Schools in the district (with 2023–24 enrollment data from the National Center for Education Statistics) are:

- Mountain Way School with 209 students in grades PreK–2
  - Christine Lion-Bailey, principal
- Morris Plains Borough School with 391 students in grades 3–8
  - Monica Crudele, principal

== Administration ==
Core members of the district's administration are:

- Mark Maire, superintendent of schools
- Catherine Jenisch, business administrator and board secretary

== Board of education ==
The district's board of education, comprised of nine members, sets policy and oversees the fiscal and educational operation of the district through its administration. As a Type II school district, the board's trustees are elected directly by voters to serve three-year terms of office on a staggered basis, with three seats up for election each year held (since 2012) as part of the November general election. The board appoints a superintendent to oversee the district's day-to-day operations and a business administrator to supervise the business functions of the district.
