= John Panelli =

American football player (1926–2012)

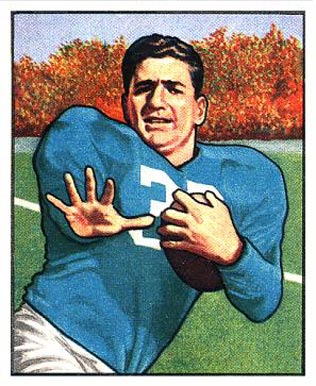
- Panelli on a 1950 Bowman football card

No. 33, 34
- Positions: Linebacker, fullback

Personal information
- Born: May 7, 1926; Morristown, New Jersey, U.S.
- Died: March 2, 2012 (aged 85); Royal Oak, Michigan, U.S.
- Listed height: 5 ft 11 in (1.80 m)
- Listed weight: 200 lb (91 kg)

Career information
- High school: Cheshire Academy (Cheshire, Connecticut); Morristown
- College: Notre Dame (1945–1948)
- NFL draft: 1949: 2nd round, 12th overall pick

Career history
- Detroit Lions (1949–1950); Chicago Cardinals (1951–1953)

Awards and highlights
- 2× National champion (1946, 1947)

Career NFL statistics
- Rushing yards: 157
- Rushing average: 2.9
- Receptions: 4
- Receiving yards: 27
- Fumble recoveries: 6
- Interceptions: 5
- Stats at Pro Football Reference

John Rocco "Bulldog" Panelli (May 7, 1926 – March 2, 2012) was an American professional football player. He played college football at the University of Notre Dame. He went on to play two seasons in the National Football League (NFL) for the Detroit Lions, and another three for the Chicago Cardinals.

Born and raised in Morristown, New Jersey, Panelli starred at Morristown High School, earning all-state honors as a student and a nomination by The Star-Ledger decades after his graduation for inclusion on its All-Century team.

Panelli died after a sudden illness on March 2, 2012. He was 85.
