= Ted Mitchell (American football) =

American football player (1905–1985)

Profile
- Position: Center

Personal information
- Born: August 4, 1905; Madison, New Jersey
- Died: October 11, 1985 (aged 80); Toms River, New Jersey
- Listed height: 5 ft 10 in (1.78 m)
- Listed weight: 195 lb (88 kg)

Career information
- High school: Madison (NJ)
- College: Bucknell

Career history
- Orange Tornadoes (1929); Newark Tornadoes (1930)

Frederick Brice "Ted" Mitchell (August 4, 1905 – October 11, 1985) was an American football player. He played college football for Bucknell and in the National Football League (NFL) as a center for the Orange Tornadoes (1929) and Newark Tornadoes (1930). He appeared in 23 NFL games, 21 as a starter.

Born and raised in Madison, New Jersey, Mitchell played prep football at Madison High School.
