= Brian Jude =

American screenwriter

- Born: Brian Jude Piatkowski; August 21, 1971 (age 54); Long Branch, New Jersey
- Occupations: Director, screenwriter, producer, actor, podcaster, motivational speaker, minister

Brian Jude (born 21 August, 1971, New Jersey) is an American screenwriter, film producer, director, actor, internet radio host and motivational speaker.

== Early life and education ==
Brian Jude was born on August 21, 1971, in Long Branch, New Jersey and grew up in Howell Township, New Jersey, where he attended Howell High School with CBS sportscaster Bonnie Bernstein, talk radio personality Scott Allen Miller and fine artist Jay Alders.

He received a Bachelor of Arts in Broadcasting at Montclair State University in 1995, and minored in both Music History/Theory and Film. His fellow students at the time included Jay Alders once again, filmmaker Tom Malloy, radio personality Christine Nagy, actress/filmmaker Susie Adriensen and actor Kevin Carolan. At Montclair, Jude became a member of Phi Mu Alpha Sinfonia fraternity and The National Broadcasting Society - Alpha Epsilon Rho, and was a disc jockey and Operations Manager at WMSC (FM).

During an internship at Batfilm Productions, headed by executive producers Michael Uslan (a family friend) and Benjamin Melniker, Jude met future Friday's Child frontman Tom Walker. Walker's predecessor at Batfilm, Kimberly Fajen, hired Jude on his first feature film job just days before his graduation in May, 1995.

== Early film career ==
Jude has worked as a producer, director, screenwriter, production manager, assistant director, production coordinator, editor and script consultant on feature-length and short films, music videos and television programs and commercials. He started his career in film providing craft service on the feature films Caught, No Way Home, and the HBO special Someone Had To Be Benny. Jude began to work his way up as an assistant director on the films Safe Men, Taxman, Some Fish Can Fly and A Day in Black and White.

In 2001, Jude launched Dragon Rider Productions, LLC with producer Richard Legon. The company was specifically formed for the development of the feature film, Ride With the Dragons, based on Jude's personal experiences in high school, focusing mainly on a friend's suicide and his step-brothers subsequent death in a car accident. Dragon Rider Productions branched out to develop and produce a variety of short, feature-length films and commercials, provide screenplay analysis and other production services.

In 2002, Brian Jude became a founding member of Exit 131 Productions, initially a "no-budget" production arm of the New Jersey Salon of the Association of Independent Video and Filmmakers, and which has since evolved into an online networking community for New Jersey filmmakers. Jude directed the group's first short, A Taste of Better Days, which starred his wife Melanie Canter and was featured in the Freedom Film Festival in Philadelphia in February, 2004, and produced their third project, The Collector's Item. Through Exit 131, Jude met screenwriter/actor Jesse Kaye (son of screenwriter John Kaye), for whom Jude produced the short, Cruel to be Kind, in which Canter also co-starred.

== Digital Cafe Tour ==
On July 30, 2005, the indie rock group Friday's Child performed a CD release concert at Luna Stage in Montclair, New Jersey. The concert was recorded on audio and video in a joint venture by Dragon Rider Productions and frontman Tom Walker's Honeybee Music, produced by Brian Jude and Tom Walker, and directed by Brian Jude. Rich Haddad produced the audio, and the video was edited by Steve Maio. The initial concept for the production was a DVD/CD called Friday's Child: Live at Luna Stage. After a handful of tracks were mixed and edited, they were released as teasers on the internet. The overwhelming response from fans made it clear that the future of the band was to turn to broadband media in order to spread their music and attract new listeners. While more videos were edited, the DVD was never released, and Friday's Child instead released the audio recordings as a studio/live album in 2007 named Democracy. The CD contained the live recordings combined with select re-mixed tracks from their 2004 album In A Word, as well as a video of the song The Chasing Game. An interactive section of the CD also promoted the web sites for Friday's Child, Dragon Rider Productions, a handful of sponsors and friends, as well as a new outlet for Friday's Child...

The team that produced the concert video (Walker, Jude, Haddad and Maio) teamed up with entertainment lawyer Rob McNeely to form Digital Cafe Tour (DCT), a production company that creates live concert video footage of independent musicians of all genres, as well as rising comedians, made specifically for new media (web, handheld media players, cell phones, etc.), with top-quality audio and video settings. Friday's Child performed at the premiere DCT concert in June 2006, launching a series of concerts running throughout the summer of 2006, which included artists the Audibles, and Secret Gossip among others. DCT continued their live concert series at other venues, such as The Cutting Room, The Baggott Inn and Kenny's Castaways.

== Film projects ==
Jude produced the horror film The Blood Shed, the psychodrama Under the Raven's Wing and the drama The Jonestown Defense. He produced and co-directed the pilot for the television series Erroneous Convictions, created by Bruce Birns and Michael Russell, and starring Tom Bartos, Kim Director and Judge Jerry Sheindlin. He developed the feature film The Miracle Man, based on the life of Morris E. Goodman, which he was inspired to pursue while watching the documentary The Secret

== Acting ==
Jude has performed in numerous stage productions since 1984, portraying such characters as Kenickie in Grease, Woof in Hair (musical) and Jesus in Jesus Christ Superstar. He has also directed The Mystery of Edwin Drood and When God Comes For Breakfast, You Don't Burn The Toast for the stage, as well as a staged reading of his screenplays Ride With the Dragons and The Miracle Man. Jude often makes on-screen cameos in the film projects in which he works, including Taxman (film), in which he was a body double for actor Joe Pantoliano, Under the Raven's Wing, Wit's End, The Jonestown Defense and Payin' the Price. Jude's first on-screen appearance was in Kevin Smith's film Chasing Amy as a commuter in the train station scene.

== Internet radio ==
In September, 2009, Jude launched the podcast The Brian Jude Show, which was syndicated on Frank Edward Nora's internet radio channel, The Overnightscape Underground. In March 2012, Jude launched a network of his own, the Inspirational Internet Radio Network, on which he hosts two shows, Success Odyssey and Manifesting Mastermind, both of which are also syndicated on The Overnightscape Underground.

== Personal life ==
Brian Jude was married to actress Melanie Canter from 2000 to 2014, with whom he has two children. He is also an ordained Universal Life Church minister and a member of the New Jersey Devil Hunters, an organization that investigates reported sightings of the Jersey Devil.

== Filmography ==
1. Caught (1996 film) [craft service] (as Brian Piatkowski)

... aka Atrapados - USA (Spanish title)

1. No Way Home (1996) [craft service] (as Brian Jude Piatkowski)
2. Chasing Amy (1997) [Actor .... Train Station Passenger] (uncredited)
3. Safe Men (1998) [second second assistant director]
4. River Red (1998) [additional location manager] (as Brian Jude Piatkowski)
5. Taxman (film) (1999/II) [second unit director] (uncredited) [key production assistant] (as Brian Jude Piatkowski)
6. Some Fish Can Fly (1999) [first assistant director] (as Brian Jude Piatkowski)
7. Steely Dan's Two Against Nature (2000) (V) [assistant production office coordinator]
8. Fast Food Fast Women (2000) [production office coordinator] (as Brian Jude Piatkowski)
9. A Day in Black and White (2001) [second assistant director]
10. A Taste of Better Days (2003) [Director] [sound editor]
11. Cruel to Be Kind (2004) [producer] [first assistant director]
12. The Pod (2006) [producer] [first assistant director] (uncredited)
13. 30 Days (2006/I) [second second assistant director]
14. Under the Raven's Wing (2007) [producer] [first assistant director] [Actor .... 'Raven's' Foster Father/Mourner] [cinematographer: second unit]
15. The Blood Shed (2007) (V) [producer]
16. Wit's End (2008) (TV) [first assistant director] [Actor .... Man in Bathroom]
17. Loose Ends (2008) [special thanks]
18. The Last Days of Frank Whyte (2009) [producer] [Director] [Writer] (screenplay)
19. The Jonestown Defense (2011) [producer]
20. That's What She Told Me (2011) [co-producer]
21. Payin' the Price (2011) [Actor .... News Anchor]
22. Erroneous Convictions (2012) TV series (post-production) [producer]
23. The Miracle Man (2014) (announced) [producer] [Director] [Writer] (screenplay)
