= Mike Hall (bassist) =

American bass player (born 1989)

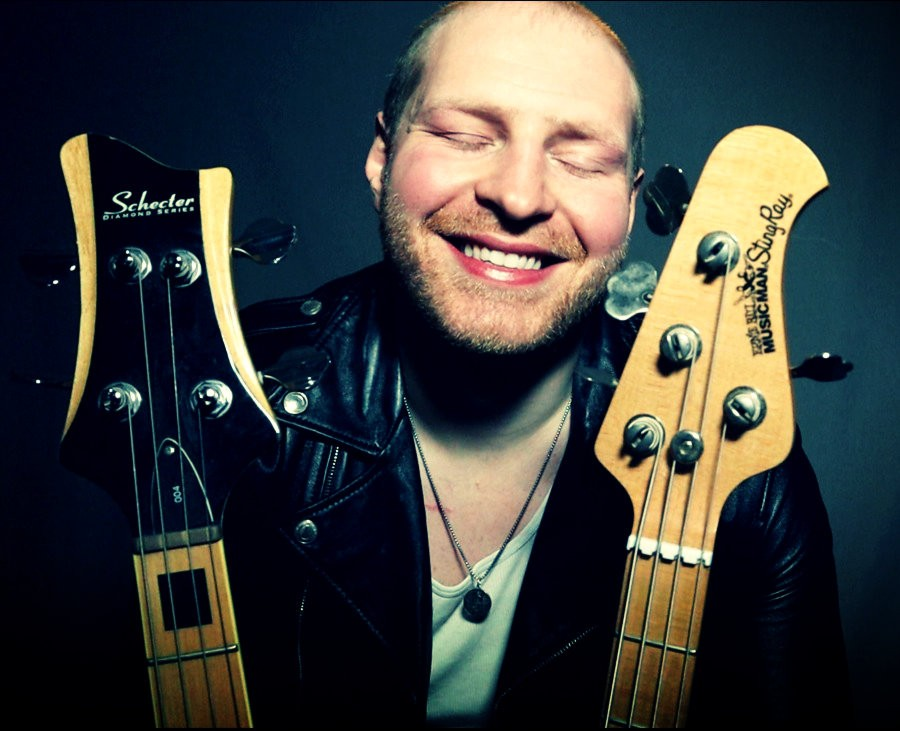

Background information
- Also known as: Michael Hall, Mike Hall Bass
- Born: October 23, 1989 (age 36)
- Origin: Madison, New Jersey, U.S.
- Genres: Instrumental, pop, rock
- Occupation: Musician
- Instrument: Bass guitar
- Years active: 2010–present
- Website: mikehallbass.com

Mike Hall (born October 23, 1989) is an American bassist from Madison, New Jersey. Hall is best known for his bass playing style as a solo instrumentalist, primarily through a playing technique that blends the use of two handed tapping, slapping, flamenco, and creates several solo bass instrumental arrangements.

== Early life ==
Hall was born on October 23, 1989, and raised in Madison, New Jersey. While in elementary school, he began playing the cello as his first serious instrument. Upon entering middle school, Hall's orchestra teacher switched him onto the upright bass due to his poor posture from childhood scoliosis. After graduating from Madison High School in 2008, Hall elected to switch over to playing the bass guitar.

== Musical career ==
Hall co-founded and managed the pop rock band Running Late. In 2020, Hall left Running Late and pursued becoming a solo instrumentalist under the artist name of "Mike Hall Bass".

Following his departure from the band, Hall received critical acclaim for his hybrid bass playing style that combines aspects of two handed tapping, slapping, and flamenco. Hall's creative approach towards arranging solo bass instrumental covers has also been the subject of education within the bass playing community.

== Influences ==
Hall has cited numerous bassists as inspirations for developing his bass playing style, including Flea from Red Hot Chili Peppers, Cliff Burton from Metallica, Larry Graham from Sly and the Family Stone, and Victor Wooten from Béla Fleck and the Flecktones.

== Education ==
Hall graduated from Centenary University as a double major in criminal justice and political science. He also graduated from Fairleigh Dickinson University with an MBA in marketing.

== Discography ==
Track list provided via Spotify.

- The Next Step [EP] (2021)
- "Fireflies: Owl City (Solo Bass Cover)" (single) (2021)
- "You'll Be in My Heart (Solo Bass Cover)" (single) (2021)
- "Californication (Solo Bass Cover)" (single) (2021)
- "Heartless (Solo Bass Cover)" (Single) (2021)
- "Everlong" (Single) (2021)
- "Clair De Lune" (Single) (2022)
- "Playing God" (Single) (2022)
- "My Immortal" (Single) (2022)
- "Carol of the Bells" (Single) (2022)
- "Stairway to Heaven" (Single) (2023)
- "Fade to Black" (Single) (2023)
- "Simple and Clean" (Single) (2024)
- "Through the Fire and Flames" (Single) (2024)
- "Toxicity" (Single) (2024)
- "Zelda's Lullaby" (Single) (2024)
- "Tifa's Theme" (Single) (2024)
- "Aerith's Theme" (Single) (2025)
