= Madison High School (New Jersey) =

High school in Morris County, New Jersey, US

Location
- 170 Ridgedale Avenue; Madison, Morris County, New Jersey 07940; United States; 40.769502°N 74.407181°W

Information
- Type: Public high school
- Established: 1958
- School district: Madison Public Schools
- NCES School ID: 340924004300
- Principal: David Drechsel
- Faculty: 70.0 FTEs
- Grades: 9–12
- Enrollment: 761 (as of 2024–25)
- Student to teacher ratio: 10.9:1
- Colors: Maroon; Gold; White
- Athletics conference: Northwest Jersey Athletic Conference (general); North Jersey Super Football Conference (football)
- Team name: Dodgers
- Newspaper: The Dodger
- Yearbook: The Alembic
- Website: www.madisonpublicschools.org/o/mhs

Madison High School is a four-year public high school serving students in ninth to twelfth grades in Morris County, in the U.S. state of New Jersey, operating as part of the Madison Public Schools. The school is located entirely in the borough of Madison. Students from Harding Township attend the school as part of a sending/receiving relationship.

As of the 2024–25 school year, the school had an enrollment of 761 students and 70.0 classroom teachers (on an FTE basis), for a student–teacher ratio of 10.9:1. There were 69 students (9.1% of enrollment) eligible for free lunch and 10 (1.3% of students) eligible for reduced-cost lunch. More than 90% of the district's graduates move on to a four-year college, with half of those attending highly competitive schools.

== History ==
The school, constructed at a cost of $2.5 million (equivalent to $27.9 million in 2025), opened in September 1958 with an enrollment of 630 students who pledged to ensure that the new building would be kept safe from vandalism. see article Talk for information on date school was established

In May 1974, the Harding Township School District was given permission by the State Commissioner of Education to end their sending / receiving relationship with the Morris School District at Morristown High School and begin sending their students to Madison High School starting with the 1975–76 school year, ruling that the withdrawal of the mostly white students from Harding Township would not "cause a disproportionate change in the racial composition of Morristown High School".

== Awards, recognition and rankings ==
The school was the 32nd-ranked public high school in New Jersey out of 339 schools statewide in New Jersey Monthly magazine's September 2014 cover story on the state's "Top Public High Schools", using a new ranking methodology. The school had been ranked 6th in the state of 328 schools in 2012, after being ranked 15th in 2010 out of 322 schools listed. The magazine ranked the school 35th in New Jersey out of 316 schools statewide, in New Jersey Monthly magazine's September 2008 cover story on the state's Top Public High Schools and was ranked 48th in the magazine's September 2006 issue, which included 316 schools across the state.

Schooldigger.com ranked the school 66th out of 381 public high schools statewide in its 2011 rankings (a decrease of 33 positions from the 2010 ranking) which were based on the combined percentage of students classified as proficient or above proficient on the mathematics (88.9%) and language arts literacy (98.0%) components of the High School Proficiency Assessment (HSPA).

In the 2011 "Ranking America's High Schools" issue by The Washington Post, the school was ranked 38th in New Jersey and 1,208th nationwide.

In its 2013 report on "America's Best High Schools", The Daily Beast ranked the school 296th in the nation among participating public high schools and 24th among schools in New Jersey.

In its listing of "America's Best High Schools 2016", the school was ranked 115th out of 500 best high schools in the country; it was ranked 22nd among all high schools in New Jersey and ninth among the state's non-magnet schools.

== Academic offerings ==
Madison High School offers four world languages (Spanish, French, and Italian, and new in the 2009–10 school year, Mandarin), in addition to a full array of academic majors in English, History, Mathematics and Science. A selection of Studio Art courses are also offered. Among the Advanced Placement courses offered are AP English Literature and Composition, AP English Language and Composition, AP US History, AP United States Government and Politics, AP Psychology, AP Human Geography, AP Calculus AB, AP Calculus BC, AP Statistics, AP Spanish, AP French, AP Italian, AP Chinese, AP Biology, AP Chemistry, AP Physics, AP Environmental Science, AP Studio Art, and AP Music Theory.

== Extracurricular activities ==
The school offers the Personal Development Program in addition to the Peer Group Connections Program, a freshman orientation, and guidance program led by upperclassmen. The music program includes an orchestra, concert band, chorus, jazz band and chorus, guitar ensemble, show band, marching band and musical theater.

=== Athletics ===
The Madison High School Dodgers compete in the Northwest Jersey Athletic Conference, which is comprised of public and private high schools in Morris, Sussex and Warren counties, and was established following a reorganization of sports leagues in Northern New Jersey by the New Jersey State Interscholastic Athletic Association (NJSIAA). Prior to the NJSIAA's 2009 realignment, the school had participated in the Suburban Division of the Northern Hills Conference, which included schools in Essex, Morris and Passaic counties. With 666 students in grades 10–12, the school was classified by the NJSIAA for the 2019–20 school year as Group II for most athletic competition purposes, which included schools with an enrollment of 486 to 758 students in that grade range. The football team competes in the American Blue division of the North Jersey Super Football Conference, which includes 112 schools competing in 20 divisions, making it the nation's biggest football-only high school sports league. The school was classified by the NJSIAA as Group II North for football for 2024–2026, which included schools with 484 to 683 students.

Madison High School offers dozens of clubs and 23 interscholastic sports, most notably including its field hockey and boys' lacrosse teams. Madison has a Sportexe "PowerBlade" artificial turf field that was completed in September 2006, and publicly unveiled the following day in a varsity football game against their division rival Delbarton School.

The boys' baseball team won the North II Group II state sectional championship in 1963 and the North II Group III state sectional championship in 1968. The team won the North II, Group II sectional championship in 2012, defeating Bernards High School by a score of 5–2 in the tournament final.

The football team won the NJSIAA North II Group II state sectional championship in 1975, 1977–1979, 2010–2012, 2015 and 2016, and won the North II Group I title in 1998. The 1975 team finished the season with a record of 10–0–1 after defeating New Providence High School by a score of 35–6 in the North II Group II sectional championship game in front of a crowd of 7,500 spectators. The 1979 team finished the season with a 11–0 record and extended its streak to 34 games without a loss with a 13–6 win against New Providence in the North II Group II sectional championship game. In 2010, the Madison football team won the North II Group II state sectional title with a 28–21 win against James Caldwell High School, ending the season with a 12–0 record and earning the program's sixth sectional title. In 2011, the Madison football team again won the North II Group II state sectional title with a 47–7 win against Summit High School, ending the season with a 12–0 record and earning the program's seventh sectional title. In 2012, the team won their third consecutive state championship, beating Mountain Lakes High School by a score of 13–0 in a game played at Kean University, finishing the season with a 12–0 record and marking their 37th consecutive victory. In 2015, the team won the North II Group II sectional title with a 27–6 win against Rutherford High School, the fourth title under head coach Chris Kubik and the program's ninth state title. In 2016, the program won its tenth sectional title and its second consecutive championship, winning the North II Group II state sectional title with a 13–7 win against Lenape Valley Regional High School in the tournament final.

The girls' spring track team was the Group II state champion in 1977.

The 1980 softball team won the Group II state championship after scoring 11 runs in an error-filled fourth inning to defeat runner-up Northern Burlington County Regional High School by a score of 12–4 in the finals of the tournament.

The boys' soccer team were Group II co-champions in 1982 after a tie in the tournament final against West Deptford High School and won the Group I state championships in 1994 against A.P. Schalick High School and won the 1996 title over Riverside High School. The 1982 won the county and conference titles before being declared as Group II co-champion after a 1–1 tie in the finals with West Deptford.

The girls' track team won the Group II indoor relay state championship in 1985 and the Group I title in 2008.

The girls' field hockey team won the North Jersey II Group II state sectional championships in 1990, 2001, 2003–2005, 2007, and 2015; won the North II Group I titles in 1994, 1997, 2016, and 2017; won the North I Group I titles in 1995, 2000 and 2006; and won the North I Group II sectional titles in 2009 and 2014. The team won the Group I state championship in 1995, and the Group II titles in 1997, 2003, 2009, and 2015. The program's five state titles are tied for ninth-most in the state. The 1997 team finished the season with a 21–0–3 record after finishing the season by winning the Group I state title by defeating Haddonfield Memorial High School by a score of 2–0 in the championship game. In 2003, the field hockey team won the Group II state championship with a 5–1 win over Pequannock Township High School in the semifinals and a 2–1 win against Allentown High School in the tournament's final match. In 2007, the field hockey team won the North II, Group II state sectional championship with a 4–2 win over Hackettstown High School (which like Madison, is now part of the new Northwest Jersey Athletic Conference) in the tournament final. In 2009, the field hockey team finished the season ranked 4th in the state by The Star-Ledger, having won the North II, Group II state sectional championship, the Morris County Championship (for the 4th consecutive year), the NJAC Conference Championship, and, most notably, the Group II state championship with a 3–1 win against Bishop Eustace Preparatory School. In 2015, under coach Ann Marie Davies, the field hockey team won the NJAC title, Morris County Tournament, North II Group II state sectional title, and the Group II state title with a 5–0 win against Wall High School. The field hockey team won the 2015 Morris County Tournament with a 2–1 win against West Morris Mendham High School in the tournament final, winning the team's fifth consecutive county title and their 21st overall.

In 2010, the girls' volleyball team came in second place in the Morris County Tournament after losing a close game against West Morris. They won the Group I South sectional finals against Secaucus High School, but lost to Bogota High School in two sets in the Group I state finals, ending their season with a 24–4 record.

In 2012, the boys' winter track team coached by Dr. Mark Ladolcetta won the North II Group I sectional title.

In 2015, the boys' ice hockey team won their first-ever Haas Cup and finished with a record 27 wins and 2 losses. The team won the Halvorsen Cup in 2018 and the Mennen Cup in 2019.

The 2017 boys lacrosse team won the Group I state championship, after a 9–6 victory in the tournament final against a Mountain Lakes High School team that had beaten them both times that they had met before in the finals.

=== Spring musical ===
Madison High School added a musical to its list of extracurriculars in 1961. Recent productions include Alice by Heart (musical), Sister Act (2025), Mamma Mia! (musical) 2024 Little Women (2023), Sweet Charity (2022), The Drowsy Chaperone (2021), Hello, Dolly! (2020), Bright Star (2019), Footloose (2018), Oklahoma! (2017), The Little Mermaid (2016), Les Misérables (2015), Bye Bye Birdie (2014), The Music Man (2013), The Wizard of Oz (2012), Sweeney Todd (2011), and, as its 50th annual spring musical, 42nd Street, in 2010. The 2019 production of Bright Star was the recipient of the Outstanding Overall Production of a Musical award at that year's Rising Star Awards hosted by the Paper Mill Playhouse.

Previous productions include The Mikado (1961), Sweethearts (1962), Finian's Rainbow (1963), The Music Man (1964), My Fair Lady (1965), Carousel (1966), The King and I (1967), Camelot (1968), Bloomer Girl (1969), Oklahoma! (1970), Milk and Honey (1971), South Pacific (1972), Hello, Dolly! (1973), Kiss Me, Kate (1974), Brigadoon (1975), Finian's Rainbow (1976), Girl Crazy (1977), Guys and Dolls (1978), The Music Man (1979), My Fair Lady (1980), Call Me Madam (1981), No, No, Nanette (1982), The Pajama Game (1983), How to Succeed in Business Without Really Trying (1984), Oklahoma! (1985), Miss Liberty (1986), West Side Story (1987), Hello, Dolly! (1988), The Sound of Music (1989), Show Boat (1990), The Pirates of Penzance (1991), The Wiz (1992), Carnival! (1993), The Boy Friend (1994), South Pacific (1995), Fiddler on the Roof (1996), Kiss Me, Kate (1997), The Music Man (1998), The Wizard of Oz (1999), Li'l Abner (2000), Carousel (2001), Once Upon a Mattress (2002), How to Succeed in Business Without Really Trying (2003), Guys and Dolls (2004), The Sound of Music (2005), My Favorite Year (2006), The King and I (2007), Seussical (2008), and Into the Woods (2009).

=== Fall drama ===
Madison High School staged a Fall Drama/Comedy Production for the first time in 1978. These productions include Barefoot in the Park (1978), Arsenic and Old Lace (1979), Don't Drink the Water (1980), Shubert Alley (1981), Blithe Spirit (1982), See How They Run (1983), The Murder Room (1984), You Can't Take it With You (1985), The Man Who Came to Dinner (1986), Don't Drink the Water (1987), The Odd Couple-Female Version (1988), Play On! (1989), Morning at Seven (1990), Brighton Beach Memoirs (1991), Night of January 16th (1992), The Odd Couple-Male and Female Version (1993), The Diary of Anne Frank (1994), A Murder is Announced (1995), The Miracle Worker (1996), The Enchanted April (1997), Exit the Body (1998), The Importance of Being Earnest (1999), I Remember Mama (2000), Our Town (2001), The Mousetrap (2002), The Odd Couple-Male and Female Version (2003), Twelve Angry Men (2004), Murder at the Vicarage (2005), Father of the Bride (2006), Play On! (2007), The Crucible (2008), You Can't Take It With You (2009), The Importance of Being Earnest (2010), The Odd Couple (2011), The Real Inspector Hound (2012), Midsummer Jersey (2013), Almost, Maine (2014), Fools (2015), Fairy Tale Courtroom (2016), Arsenic and Old Lace (2017), Clue: On Stage (2018) Last Day of School (2019), It's a Wonderful Life (2020), Murder on the Orient Express (2021), The Curious Savage (2022), Birthday Candles (2023), Steel Magnolias (2024) and Blithe Spirit (2024).

=== Madison Marching Dodgers ===
In 2009, Madison High School revived its marching band, which hadn't performed since its departure almost 25 years earlier. Frank Russ Batsch, the band director, is the head of the marching band along with a staff that includes many of his former students, who are mainly volunteers. In 2010, the Marching Dodgers embarked upon their first competitive season. The Marching Dodger Band placed 1st in each regular season competition, taking home awards for High Music and High Visual, and placed 1st at the Championship Competition held at West Essex High School. The Marching Dodger Band went on to win 2nd place in Class 2A of the Tournament of Bands at the Atlantic Coast Championships out of almost 135 other bands on the East Coast within their region. In their 2011 season, they won every competition they entered. In their 2012 season, the Marching Dodgers competed as a part of the chapter 2 open class, in Tournament of Bands. In their 2016 season, their field show, called "Cityscape", won 9th place in the Group 3 Open Atlantic Coast Championships.

== Plagiarism scandal ==
During Madison High School's 2005 graduation ceremony, School Board President Melissa Elias gave a commencement address plagiarized from a graduation address delivered by Anna Quindlen at Mount Holyoke College in 1999. Before Elias's resignation, the Madison School Board released a statement declaring that "the board does not condone nor tolerate plagiarism within the Madison School community and expects all members of our community to adhere to the highest ethical standards."

== Administration ==
The school's principal is David Drechsel. His core administration team includes four assistant principals.

== Notable alumni ==
- Helena Antonaccio (born 1949, class of 1967), Playboy Playmate in June 1969
- Dean Faiello (born 1959, class of 1977), pleaded guilty to murdering and burying Maria Cruz under his Staten Island house after performing illegal plastic surgery on her
- Janeane Garofalo (born 1964), comedian and actress attended, but did not graduate from Madison High School
- Mike Hall (born 1989, class of 2008), bassist
- Jack the Whipper (born 1988, class of 2006; stage name of Jack Lepiarz), circus performer and social media personality, best known for his whipcracking stage show
- Vincent LaRusso (born 1978), actor best known for his roles as "Adam Banks" from The Mighty Ducks trilogy
- Ted Mitchell (1905–1985), American football center who played in the NFL for the Orange/Newark Tornadoes
- Neil O'Donnell (born 1966), quarterback for the Pittsburgh Steelers, Cincinnati Bengals, New York Jets, and Tennessee Titans
- Matthew Platkin (born 1986/1987), Attorney General of New Jersey since 2022
- Lange Schermerhorn (born 1939, class of 1957), career foreign service officer who served as United States Ambassador to Djibouti from December 1997 until November 2000
- Daniel Silverstein (class of 2006), fashion designer and finalist on NBC's Fashion Star
- Mary Wilkinson Streep (1915–2001), fine artist and art editor
- Eddie Trunk (born 1964), heavy metal radio host
- Catherine Zimmerman (born 1995), soccer forward who played for Sky Blue FC of the National Women's Soccer League
