= Morris E. Goodman =

American motivational speaker and author (born 1945)

- Born: November 9, 1945 (age 80)
- Other name: "The Miracle Man"
- Occupations: Motivational speaker, author
- Known for: Surviving a plane crash that almost made him not able to speak, walk, move and eat.
- Spouse: Cathy Goodman (m. 1990; died 2009)
- Website: Official website

Morris E. Goodman passed away on January 27th of 2026.

https://www.maitlandfuneralhome.com/obituaries/Morris-Everett-Goodman?obId=47130019

Morris E. Goodman (born November 9, 1945) is an American motivational speaker and author. Goodman has been called "The Miracle Man" following his recovery from a plane crash which left him paralyzed and unable to move, breathe, talk or swallow.

== Biography ==
In the summer of 1970 Goodman "was a college dropout, lacking purpose and direction" according to his 1985 autobiography. At a local book store, Goodman found the 1937 book Think and Grow Rich by Napoleon Hill, as well as other books and tapes by motivational speakers such as Zig Ziglar. Following this, Goodman sought a sales career in the insurance industry, where his uncle worked. Within a year, he had joined the Million Dollar Round Table, an association of insurance salesmen. Within ten years, he was running his own company, Morris Goodman and Associates.

In March 1981 Goodman had obtained his pilot's license and had bought his own airplane, a Cessna 172. On March 10, 1981, Goodman took a flight around Chesapeake Bay and the southern tip of the Delmarva Peninsula. Without any warning, the plane's engine lost power. Goodman attempted to maneuver the aircraft back toward the airstrip in Cape Charles, Virginia, to make an emergency landing. (The official NTSB accident report makes no mention of engine trouble.) As he approached the runway, the plane flew through a low-hung set of power lines, crashed to the ground, and flipped over. Goodman broke his C-1 (atlas) and C-2 (axis) cervical vertebrae, and was left fully paralyzed. He was unable to breathe, talk, or swallow on his own, and could only communicate by blinking his eyes.

After initial treatment at a local hospital in nearby Nassawadox, Virginia, Goodman was moved to Norfolk General in Norfolk, Virginia, where surgery was performed. Goodman's sister, Pat Waldo, realized that Goodman was conscious by noticing his limited eye movement. Waldo constructed a series of charts which contained the alphabet and other important subjects, each item correlating to a particular number. Goodman was able to blink his eyes for the number of times to relate to a particular object on each chart, which allowed Goodman to communicate in a limited capacity.

On April 6, 1981, Goodman was transferred to the University of Virginia Medical Center in Charlottesville, Virginia. After weeks of intense practice, voluntarily using other abdominal muscles, Goodman was able to take his first breath without the use of a machine. Doctors slowly reduced the settings on Goodman's ventilator until he was finally able to breathe on his own. Soon Goodman began working with speech therapists until he was able to utter a single word - "Mama." On June 1, 1981, Goodman was moved to The Towers - a former rehabilitation center at UVA Medical Center where he began to eat, and began working on learning to walk again.

On July 6, 1981, Goodman was admitted to the Woodrow Wilson Rehabilitation Center in Fishersville, Virginia. With physical therapy and occupational therapy, Goodman continued to work to improve his leg muscle strength and stamina until he could stand on his own. After several weeks, Goodman was able to walk unassisted, and was released on November 13, 1981.

Morris later worked as a motivational speaker, delivering talks for Fortune 500 companies and religious organizations.

== Media appearances ==
Goodman wrote a book about his experiences, The Miracle Man: An Inspiring Story of Motivation and Courage. A motivational/training short film about Morris' experience was also made, and a feature film of his story, written and to be directed and produced by filmmaker Brian Jude is currently in development.

Goodman also appeared in Rhonda Byrne's documentary film and book The Secret together with his wife, Cathy Goodman, who died of breast cancer in 2009.
