= Madison Public Schools =

School district in Morris County, New Jersey, US

Address
- 359 Woodland Road Madison, Morris County, New Jersey, 07940; United States
- Coordinates: 40.754496°N 74.429093°W

District information
- Grades: PreK to 12
- Superintendent: John N. Connolly
- Business administrator: Jawad Issak
- Schools: 5

Students and staff
- Enrollment: 2,485 (as of 2023–24)
- Faculty: 225.0 FTEs
- Student–teacher ratio: 11.0:1

Other information
- District Factor Group: I
- Website: www.madisonpublicschools.org
Ind.	Per pupil	District spending	Rank (*)	K-12 average	%± vs. average
1A	Total Spending	$18,612	44	$18,891	−1.5%
1	Budgetary Cost	13,752	37	14,783	−7.0%
2	Classroom Instruction	7,816	23	8,763	−10.8%
6	Support Services	2,511	56	2,392	5.0%
8	Administrative Cost	1,478	29	1,485	−0.5%
10	Operations & Maintenance	1,408	19	1,783	−21.0%
13	Extracurricular Activities	537	61	268	100.4%
16	Median Teacher Salary	63,235	34	64,043
Data from NJDoE 2014 Taxpayers' Guide to Education Spending. *Of K-12 districts with 1,800-3,500 students. Lowest spending=1; Highest=68

The Madison Public Schools is a comprehensive community public school district that serves students in pre-kindergarten through twelfth grade from Madison, in Morris County, in the U.S. state of New Jersey.

As of the 2023–24 school year, the district, comprised of five schools, had an enrollment of 2,485 students and 225.0 classroom teachers (on an FTE basis), for a student–teacher ratio of 11.0:1.

The district had been classified by the New Jersey Department of Education as being in District Factor Group "I", the second-highest of eight groupings. District Factor Groups organize districts statewide to allow comparison by common socioeconomic characteristics of the local districts. From lowest socioeconomic status to highest, the categories are A, B, CD, DE, FG, GH, I and J.

The district's high school also serves the neighboring community of Harding Township, who attend as part of a sending/receiving relationship with the Harding Township School District.

Average K–12 class sizes range from 19-22 students. Nearly 70% of faculty members possess advanced degrees, and all faculty members fulfilled the Highly Qualified Teacher standards established by the federal No Child Left Behind legislation. About 90% of Madison High graduates annually attend institutions of higher learning.

== Curriculum ==
The district provides a comprehensive K-12 curriculum of study in language arts, mathematics, science, social studies, world languages (Spanish, French, Italian, Mandarin Chinese), music, visual and performing arts, computer sciences, health and physical education. Educationally disabled students are provided with a full continuum of educational supports. Madison High School provides students with the opportunity to participate in 18 Advanced Placement Program courses. The school's partnered with the Borough of Madison on the community-wide Rosenet computer network and K–12 students have extensive access to computer technology.

== Extracurricular activities ==
The Madison School District offers a comprehensive extracurricular program. Madison High School features 45 boys and girls athletic teams spanning 18 sports. Competing in the Northwest Jersey Athletic Conference, Madison High School teams have earned an ample array of conference, county, and state titles. Music students participate in orchestra, band and chorus beginning in elementary school, and numerous Madison High School music students are chosen annually to participate in regional and state select performing groups.

== Schools ==
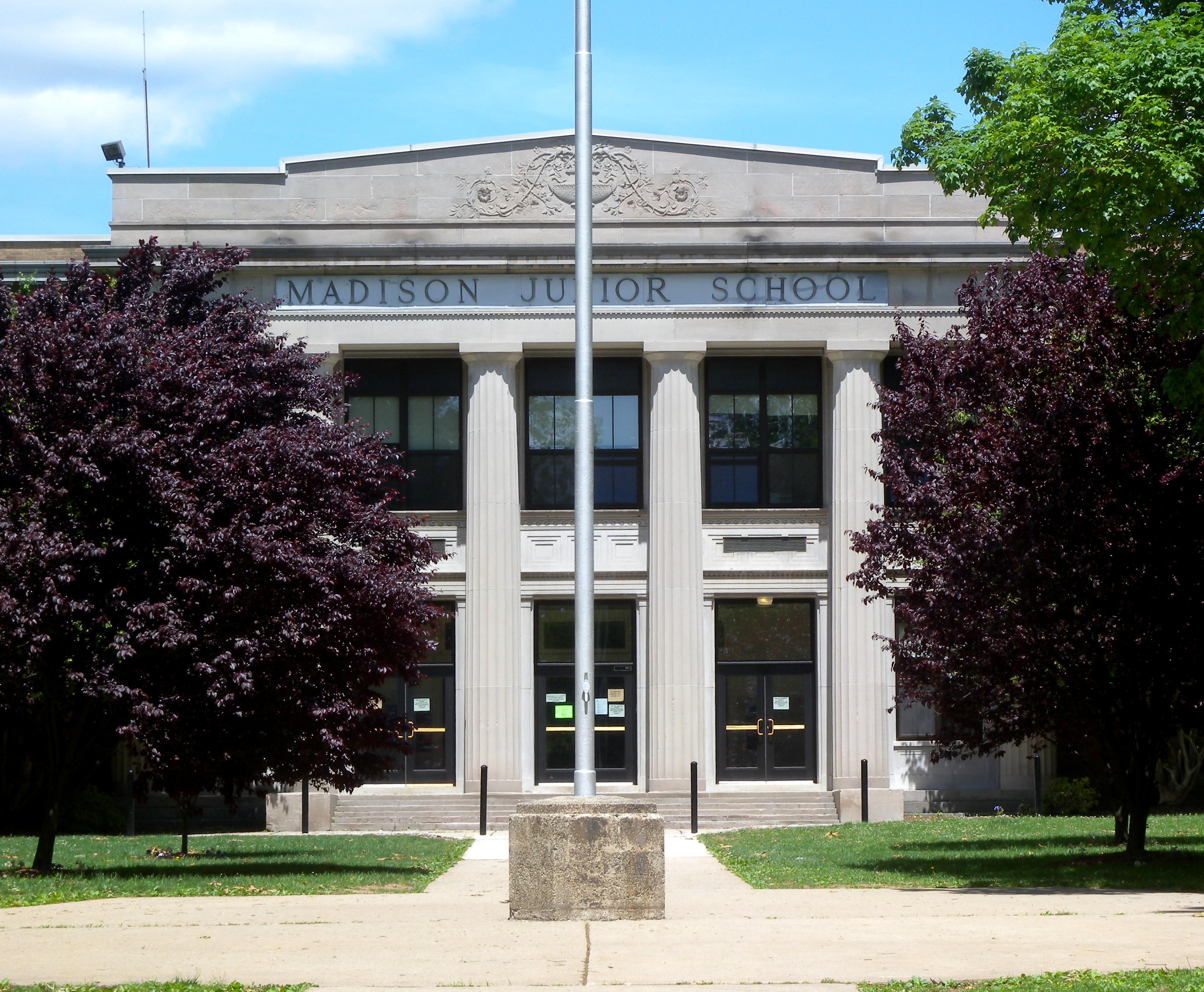
Madison Junior

Schools in the district (with 2023–24 enrollment data from the National Center for Education Statistics) are:

Elementary schools

- Central Avenue School with 498 students in grades PreK–5
  - Thomas Liss, principal
- Kings Road School with 292 students in grades K–5
  - Kathleen Koop, principal
- Torey J. Sabatini School with 292 students in grades K–5
  - Ileana Garcia, principal

Middle school

- Madison Junior School with 557 students in grades 6–8
  - Frank Perrone, principal

High school

- Madison High School with 816 students in grades 9–12
  - David Drechsel, principal

== Administration ==
Core members of the district's administration are:

- John N. Connolly, superintendent
- Jawad Issak, business administrator and board secretary

== Board of education ==
The district's board of education, comprised of seven members, sets policy and oversees the fiscal and educational operation of the district through its administration. As a Type II school district, the board's trustees are elected directly by voters to serve three-year terms of office on a staggered basis, with three seats up for election each year held (since 2012) as part of the November general election. The board appoints a superintendent to oversee the district's day-to-day operations and a business administrator to supervise the business functions of the district. An eighth trustee is appointed to represent Harding Township.

== Noted alumni ==
Notable district alumni include:

- Janeane Garofalo (born 1964), actress who attended, but did not graduate from Madison High School
- Neil O'Donnell (born 1966), quarterback for the Pittsburgh Steelers, Cincinnati Bengals and New York Jets
