= WJSV =

Radio station in Morristown, New Jersey

- Morristown, New Jersey; United States
- Frequency: 90.5 MHz
- Branding: Rocking from the Dungeon

Programming
- Format: High school radio

Ownership
- Owner: Morris School District

History
- Call sign meaning: Just Solid Vibes

Technical information
- Licensing authority: FCC
- Facility ID: 43849
- Class: A
- ERP: 125 watts
- HAAT: 5.0 meters (16.4 ft)
- Transmitter coordinates: 40°50′10″N 74°29′16″W

Links
- Public license information: Public file; LMS
- Webcast: elastic.webplayer.xyz/wjsv

WJSV is a student-run radio station in Morristown, New Jersey. WJSV is run by students of Morristown High School and owned by the Morris School District. WJSV, first bought by the Morris School District in 1971, generally broadcasts Monday through Friday from 7:30 am to 8:30 pm while school is in session. WJSV's main transmitter is located at Mountain Way School in Morris Plains, New Jersey.

Currently, the station is completely run by members and an executive staff composed totally of students. The executive staff is mainly an emulation of the above the line positions at a commercial radio station, including Program Director, Music Director, News Director, and Station Manager. Usually the station is supervised only by two staff members, one being the Station Advisor, currently Lance Armstrong, formerly Michael Butler; the other is the Chief Engineer, formerly Steven Woodruff. Currently, the station's only staff supervisor is Lance Armstrong, who teaches broadcasting at the school and also supervises Colonial Corner, Morristown High School's online-only TV show, which can be found on YouTube.

Before the station was bought by the Morris School District, Morristown High School had already had a TV station, which upon purchasing WJSV, was renamed JSV-TV. For many years it was used for a weekly show named Colonial Corner. However, in the 2013–2014 school year, Colonial Corner moved to an online-only format, with episodes hosted on YouTube.

Former to Current Station Managers
Year	Station Manager		
2011-2012	Deanna Colasurdo	Wesley Vogel	-
2013	Rebecca Beneroff	Allison Lott	-
2014	Jeremy Herbert	Michael Chase	-
2015	Saeah Yenesel	Nicki Franco	-
2016	Devon Cupo	Brian Coven	-
2017	Lucas Mohs	Kimmy Speers	-
2018	Lucas Mohs	Amelia Langan	-
2019	Lauren Hicks	Amelia Langan	-
2020	Sean Tierney	Michael Mohs	-
2021	Michael Mohs	CJ DeVries	-
2022	Dante Santaniello	Johnny Mustion	-
2023	John Nolan III	Isis Bookhart	-
2024	Eric Ottaiano	Lillian Crean	-
2025	Noah Ghelli	-	-
2026	Alec V. Ratterree	Jack Z. Cardinali	Amelia Corcoran
2027	Amelia Corcoan	Aitana Drayer	-

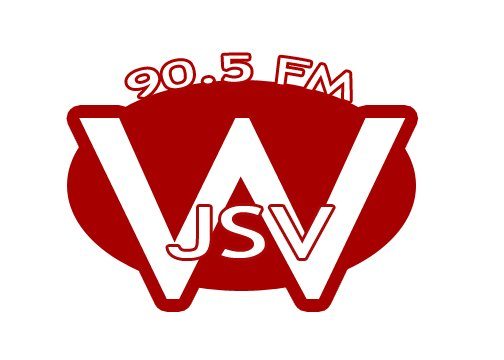
Former logo of WJSV

== Colonial Corner - (formerly JSV-TV) ==
Colonial Corner is Morristown High School's television show which is produced in its entirety by students. Originally airing on Cablevision channel 77 and later over classroom television sets during a one-hour AEP block, Colonial Corner made a switch to a YouTube-only platform in 2010. Episodes are now produced throughout the school year and are uploaded approximately every three weeks. The shows generally feature a lineup of "pieces", ranging in subject, with host segments in between to introduce them. An opening sequence, bumpers, and credits help to define the show.

Former to Current Executive Producers
Year	Executive Producers		
2011-2013	Zaji Zabalerio	-	-
2014	Brian Pizzuti	Austin Casabona	Matt Prusso
2015	Matt Prusso	Jessica Torres	-
2016	Matt Prusso	R.J. Meyer	-
2017	Darren Gong	-	-
2018	Mat Mruz	-	-
2019	Nya Federoff	Kevin Crawford	-
2020	Will Mruz	Kevin Crawford	
2021	Will Mruz	-	-
2022	John Nolan III	-	-
2023	John Nolan III	Emma Ramirez	-
2024	Roman Santaniello	-	-
2025	Abigail Schnipp	-	-
2026	Mason Mitchell	Ainsley Avers	-
2027	Maya Crecelius	Kevin Hernandez	-

== Marathon ==
"Marathon" is the name for the station's annual 24-hour broadcast. Held over a 24-hour period beginning at 2:30 PM on a Friday (the school day ends at 2:15) and ending at 2:30 PM the following Saturday, Marathon is usually in late winter or early spring. Staff stay inside the broadcasting studios for the entire duration, and attempt to have hosts broadcasting live on air for the entire event, as well as filming an entire episode of Colonial Corner.

The festivities typically include the consumption of large amounts of snack food and caffeine, as well as video games and various other ways to pass the time. The event primarily focuses on bonding between staff members, and traditionally includes a viewing of the preceding year's blooper reel. Many staff members do not manage to stay for the entirety of the event, with about one third of the staff "finishing". The remaining "survivors" usually take a photo together at the end of the event, which is usually used to lightheartedly "shame" those who did not stay for the entire event.
