= Morristown High School =

High school in Morris County, New Jersey, US

Location
- 50 Early Street; Morristown, Morris County, New Jersey 07960; United States; 40°48′05″N 74°29′11″W

Information
- Type: Public high school
- Established: 1869; 157 years ago
- School district: Morris School District
- NCES School ID: 341081004366
- Principal: Mark Manning
- Faculty: 138.6 FTEs
- Grades: 9-12
- Enrollment: 1,816 (as of 2024–25)
- Student to teacher ratio: 13.1:1
- Colors: Maroon and white
- Athletics conference: Northwest Jersey Athletic Conference (general); North Jersey Super Football Conference (football)
- Team name: Colonials
- Publication: The Tricorn (literary magazine)
- Newspaper: The Broadcaster
- Yearbook: The Cobbonian
- Radio station: WJSV 90.5
- Television Station: Colonial Corner
- Website: mhs.morrisschooldistrict.org

Morristown High School (MHS) is a four-year public high school serving students in ninth through twelfth grades from three communities in Morris County, in the U.S. state of New Jersey, operating as part of the Morris School District. The school serves students from Morristown and Morris Township, along with students from Morris Plains, who attend the district's high school as part of a sending/receiving relationship with the Morris Plains Schools. The school has been accredited by the Middle States Association of Colleges and Schools Commission on Elementary and Secondary Schools since 1952.

As of the 2024–25 school year, the school had an enrollment of 1,816 students and 138.6 classroom teachers (on an FTE basis), for a student–teacher ratio of 13.1:1. There were 619 students (34.1% of enrollment) eligible for free lunch and 120 (6.6% of students) eligible for reduced-cost lunch.

MHS receives students from Frelinghuysen Middle School, Morris Plains Borough School and several public and private middle schools.

== History ==
Morristown High School was opened on December 13, 1869 on Maple Avenue, four years after Morristown had seceded from Morris Township. It accepted students from both the town and the township. The first graduates were the class of 1874, consisting of eight students, five girls and three boys.

Morristown High School played its first football game on September 28, 1901, against Port Oram (now Wharton) high school.

The cornerstone of the current MHS building was laid on September 9, 1916. Classes at the current building began on September 4, 1918.

In May 1974, the Harding Township School District was given permission by the State Commissioner of Education to end their sending / receiving relationship with the Morris School District and begin sending their students to Madison High School starting with the 1975–76 school year, ruling that the withdrawal of the mostly white students from Harding Township would not "cause a disproportionate change in the racial composition of Morristown High School".

On May 4, 1974, Morristown High School had "racial violence" between Black and white students, which started at a carnival on Madison Street and erupted again in subsequent days, resulting in several injuries to students. The school was closed while efforts were made to address tensions.

In 2005, Linda D. Murphy, an assistant principal at Morristown High School, was promoted to principal of Morristown High School, becoming the first Morristown High School graduate (Class of 1972) to fill the position.

In 2009, year-round rotating block schedule replaced the semester-based block scheduling.

In 2013, A/B block scheduling replaced the year-round rotating block schedule.

In 2018, Homeroom was abolished in exchange for a later starting time.

On March 14, 2018, students walked out to protest gun violence after one month of the school shooting in Parkland, Florida.

== Awards, recognition and rankings ==
The school was the 116th-ranked public high school in New Jersey out of 339 schools statewide in New Jersey Monthly magazine's September 2014 cover story on the state's "Top Public High Schools", using a new ranking methodology. The school had been ranked 75th in the state of 328 schools in 2012, after being ranked 66th in 2010 out of 322 schools listed. The magazine ranked the school 78th in 2008 out of 316 schools.

In the 2011 "Ranking America's High Schools" issue by The Washington Post, the school was ranked 69th in New Jersey and 2,029th nationwide.

== Academics ==
Morristown High School provides 285 courses (including Honors and AP) to its students. Out of the 285 courses, 28 are offered as AP courses and range from AP Calculus BC to AP Music Theory. College Prep level courses are also offered to students as a step down from Honors level courses. AP tests along with SAT and ACT exams are conducted onsite. Students have access to extracurricular activities in the form of programs like Marching Band, Jazz Ensemble, or Theatre; student clubs like Girls Who Code, Future Teachers, or Habitat for Humanity; honor societies.

Morristown High School also offers "STEM Academy," an enrichment program for students in grades 9-12. STEM Academy offers pathways in Biomedicine, Engineering, Architecture, Environmental Sustainability, Research Science, Computer Science, Mathematics and General STEM.

== Athletics ==
The Morristown High School Colonials participate in the Northwest Jersey Athletic Conference, an athletic conference comprised of high schools located in Morris, Sussex and Warren counties, operating under the auspices of the New Jersey State Interscholastic Athletic Association. Prior to the NJSIAA's 2010 realignment, the school had competed as part of the Iron Hills Conference, which included schools in Essex, Morris and Union counties. With 1,394 students in grades 10-12, the school was classified by the NJSIAA for the 2019–20 school year as Group IV for most athletic competition purposes, which included schools with an enrollment of 1,060 to 5,049 students in that grade range. The football team competes in the Freedom Blue division of the North Jersey Super Football Conference, which includes 112 schools competing in 20 divisions, making it the nation's biggest football-only high school sports league. The school was classified by the NJSIAA as Group V North for football for 2024–2026, which included schools with 1,317 to 5,409 students.

The boys track team won the Group III spring / outdoor track state championship in 1959.

The boys cross country running team won the Group IV state championship in 1967 and 1985, and won the Group III title in 1996 and 1997.

The boys track team won the indoor track public state championship in Group IV in 1969.

The football team won the North II Group IV state sectional championship in 1974, North II Group III title in 1993, 1997, 1998, 1999 and 2010. The 1974 team finished the season with a 10-0 record after winning the first North II Group IV sectional title of the playoff era with a 30-10 victory against Bloomfield High School at the championship game played indoors in front of a crowd of 4,500 at Atlantic City Convention Hall. The 1993 team finished the season with a 9-1-1 record after winning the North II Group III title with a 25-0 victory against Morris Knolls High School in the championship game. The 1998 team won the North II Group III sectional championship by a score of 37-14 over Westfield High School, to finish the season 11-0.

The boys' track team won the Group IV indoor relay state championship in 1987 and 1988, and won the Group III title in 2010.

The field hockey team won the North II Group IV state sectional championship in 1987, 1989 and 1991, won the North I Group IV title in 2002 and 2016-2018, and won the North I Group III title in 2005 and 2006.

The baseball team won the Group III state championship in 1993 (defeating Steinert High School in the tournament final) and 2006 (vs. Ocean Township High School), and won the Group IV title in 2004 (vs. Steinert). The team won the Group III state championship in 2006 with wins over Northern Valley Regional High School at Old Tappan in the semifinals and Ocean Township High School in the finals, by scores of 3-1 and 11–7, respectively. They finished the season ranked third in the state in The Star Ledger's Top 20. The team has won the Morris County Tournament 15 times, the most of any school in tournament history, winning in 1968, 1971, 1972, 1975-1977, 1979, 1985, 1986, 1990, 1993, 1999, 2009, 2010 and 2018.

The girls cross country team won the Group III state championship in 1997 and 2011.

The boys fencing team was the épée team winner in 2005. The program's nine individual state champions is tied for third-most in the state.

The ice hockey team won the Public B championship in 2014 and won the Public A title in 2016. The team won the Public B state championship in 2014, beating Ramsey High School by a score of 1–0 in the tournament final, with the game-winning goal scored with less than a minute left in the game to break a scoreless tie and earn Morristown the program's first championship. In 2016, the team won their second title, this time in the Public A division, against Randolph High School by a final score of 2–0.

The girls lacrosse team won the North Jersey Group IV girls lacrosse championship in 2022 and 2024, both times against Ridgewood High School.

The girls softball team won the North I Group IV sectional championship in 2024, against Columbia High School.

The girls basketball team won the North I Group IV sectional title in 2017 and 2024.

The school has two certified athletic trainers providing sports medicine coverage to all levels of athletics across all three seasons.

== Administration ==
The school's principal is Mark Manning. His core administration team includes four assistant principals.

== Notable people ==
=== Alumni ===
- James J. Barry Jr. (born 1946, class of 1964), former member of the New Jersey General Assembly and director of the New Jersey Division of Consumer Affairs
- Scott Blumstein (born 1992, class of 2010), winner of the 2017 World Series of Poker Main Event for $8,150,000.
- Samuel S. Childs (1863–1961), restaurateur and politician from New Jersey, who was founder and president of Childs Restaurants
- John T. Cunningham (1915-2012, class of 1932), journalist, writer, and historian who published numerous works related to the history of his native state, New Jersey.
- Christina Epps (born 1991, class of 2009), track and field athlete specializing in the triple jump; member of US 2016 Olympic Team
- Alexander Hedge (born 1997, class of 2015), rower, who has represented the United States in competitions and won two gold medals at the 2023 Pan American Games
- Daniel Kleitman (born 1934, class of 1950), professor of applied mathematics at MIT.
- Connor Lade (born 1989, class of 2008), former professional soccer player for the New York Red Bulls
- Fran Lebowitz (born 1950), author, public speaker and occasional actor.
- Bob McCann (1964-1971), former professional basketball player who played for five teams in the NBA.
- Craig Newmark (born 1952, class of 1971), creator of the web community Craigslist.
- Tim O'Connor (born 1976, class of 1995), professional skateboarder
- John Panelli (1926-2012), American football player who played in the NFL for the Detroit Lions and the Chicago Cardinals.
- Dan Quinn (born 1970, class of 1989), football coach
- Gene Shalit (born 1926), book and movie critic
- Rick Sofield (born 1956, class of 1975), former Major League Baseball first-round draft pick; former outfielder for the Minnesota Twins
- Clifton Todd Britt (born 1969, Class of 1987), stage name of Lexington Steele, adult film star.
- Jahmar Thorpe (born 1984), professional basketball player for the Iwate Big Bulls in Japan.
- William Treanor (born 1957, class of 1975), attorney and legal scholar; dean of Georgetown University Law Center
- C. Alfred Voegeli (1904–1984, class of 1922), bishop of the Episcopal Diocese of Haiti, serving from 1943 to 1971.
- Ben Weinman (born 1975), musician who was a founding member of The Dillinger Escape Plan and current member of Suicidal Tendencies.
- Stephen B. Wiley (1929-2015, class of 1947), attorney, poet, businessman, civic leader and politician who served in the New Jersey State Senate from 1973 to 1978.

=== Faculty ===
- John Chironna (1928–2010), former head football coach at the University of Rhode Island; teacher and head football coach at Morristown; mentored Charlie Weis
- William Flynn (c. 1896-1958), football coach who was head coach at Morristown from 1934 until his death.
- Joyce Kilmer (1886–1918), poet and author; taught at Morristown High School, 1908-1909
- Charlie Weis (born 1956), former head football coach at the University of Notre Dame; assistant football coach and English teacher, 1980-1985 He was also the school's fencing coach for the 1984–85 season.
- Hans Wieselgren (born 1952), Olympic fencer and fencing coach
