= Alpha Epsilon Rho =

International electronic media honor society

- ΑΕΡ
- Founded: April 30, 1943; 83 years ago Stephens College
- Type: Honor
- Affiliation: ACHS
- Status: Active
- Emphasis: Electronic Media
- Scope: International
- Member badge
- Colors: Red and Green
- Chapters: 89+
- Members: 80,000 lifetime
- Nickname: AERho
- Headquarters: c/o Broadcast Education Association, 1 M Street SE; Washington, D.C. 20003; United States
- Website: www.beaweb.org/wp/aerho/

Alpha Epsilon Rho (ΑΕΡ) is an international scholastic honor society recognizing academic achievement among students in the field of electronic media (including web/internet technologies, broadcasting, mass communication, radio, television, cable, and/or film). The honor society is managed as part of the larger Broadcast Education Association (BEA).

== History ==
Stephens College students interested in radio technology formed a recognition group called Beta Epsilon Phi on December 1, 1941. With an interest in national expansion, the group reached out to similarly inclined students at other institutions, including representatives from Syracuse University and the University of Minnesota. A series of meetings were held at the Institute for Education by Radio, in Columbus, Ohio, resulting in the creation of a new national organization.

The new national organization adopted the name Alpha Epsilon Rho on April 30, 1943, which is considered its founding date. On April 13, 1947, radio station at Syracuse University began regularly scheduled broadcasts on the FM band using the call sign letters of WAER (W Alpha Epsilon Rho).

In 1975, the organization became a part of the National Electrical Manufacturers Association, changing its name to The National Broadcasting Society - Alpha Epsilon Rho (NBS-AERho), indicating its change from a recognition society into a professional society. In 1977, it had 56 active chapters and 11,600 initiated members.

As a unit of the National Broadcasting Society (NBS), Alpha Epsilon Rho would later become an honor society.

Alpha Epsilon Rho was admitted to the Association of College Honor Societies in 2009. In 2011, it had 83 active chapters and 41,043 members. Alpha Epsilon Rho became affiliated with Broadcast Education Association (BEA) on May 1, 2023.

== Symbols ==
The society's colors are red and green, symbolizing courageous ambition and growth. Later, this was updated to red representing energy and courage, with green symbolizing faithfulness and integrity. There is graduation regalia for students.

Its badge was in the shape of a microphone with seed pearls along either side, with the Greek letters ΑΕΡ across the top. Its emblem combined a stylized single-sprocket film cell, a poly-directional microphone, and the front turret of a three-lens camera into a symbol that was on top of a stylized motion picture film frame.

The society's creed is:

To bind together, in a fraternal and professional bond, men and women dedicated to the future, the development, and the profession of the field of electronic media. To make responsibility our action, achievement our goal, and excellence our ideal, realizing that the trust placed within us, with our profession, can change the destiny of the world.

== Activities ==
Alpha Epsilon Rho hosts an annual convention for students and professionals. Chapters sponsor speakers and go on field trips.

== Chapters ==
Alpha Epsilon Tau had chartered more than 89 chapters.

== Membership ==
Potential members must be in the top third of their college class and have a GPA of 3.25 overall and in electronic media courses.

== Notable members ==
- Brian Jude, screenwriter
- Dennis Stapleton, Ohio House of Representatives
- Bobbie Wygant, television news reporter and interviewer
- Antonio Zarro, director and actor

== See also ==
- Professional fraternities and sororities
