= WMSC (FM) =

Radio station at Montclair State University in Montclair, New Jersey

- Upper Montclair, New Jersey; United States
- Broadcast area: Northern New Jersey
- Frequency: 90.3 MHz

Programming
- Format: Alternative rock

Ownership
- Owner: Montclair State University

History
- First air date: 1966; 60 years ago
- Call sign meaning: Montclair State College (earlier name of owning university)

Technical information
- Licensing authority: FCC
- Facility ID: 43579
- Class: D
- ERP: 1 watt
- HAAT: 205 meters
- Transmitter coordinates: 40°51′53.00″N 74°12′3.00″W

Links
- Public license information: Public file; LMS
- Webcast: Listen live (via iHeartRadio)
- Website: wmscradio.com

WMSC is a college radio station located at and owned by Montclair State University in Montclair, New Jersey, United States. WMSC broadcasts at 90.3 MHz. WMSC is operated by the students of Montclair State University with university administrator Anabella Poland serving as its current general manager.

== Programming ==
The station broadcasts and charts alternative/indie rock and pop with a healthy dose of talk, news and sports. Overnight and weekend shifts feature a variety of specialty shows, and community programming.

== Specialty shows ==
During evening hours and a few weekend shifts WMSC broadcasts specialty shows:

- The Metal Teddy Bear Experience (Metal)
- Back to the Future
- Neon Vice Lair (Visual Atmospheric)
- Stomp N' Stroll Radio (Ska, Punk & Rock)

== Community programming ==
WMSC features a number of talk, local news and local sports shows

- The Morning Buzz (Morning News / Talk Show)
- Montclair Newsroom (Public Affairs Show)
- In the Loop! (Campus News)
- Coffee With Montclair (Local News)

== Sports programming ==
The sports department broadcasts all home and select away games for both men's and women's Red Hawk teams.

== History ==
=== At the beginning... ===
"The Voice of Montclair State" was founded by a group of students seeking to connect students and the surrounding community. Montclair was primarily a commuter college with on-campus housing for only about 25% of its 1966 student population. Most of the commuters and off-campus housing students left the campus at the end of their classes and seldom returned to participate in the wide variety of campus activities available. A commuter student from Clifton, New Jersey, Ed Helvey, felt that a college-based FM radio station could help better connect the commuter and off-campus students with their campus. In his first year, he founded the Montclair State Amateur Radio Society and then, during his second year, began a campaign to build interest in creating a college broadcast radio station.

By the second semester of his junior year Ed Helvey had recruited a core group of students who became the foundation of "The Voice of Montclair State". Mr. Tete Tetens Jr., an Education professor and a broadcast engineer licensed by the Federal Communications Commission (FCC) who worked part-time for WPAT at its Clifton, NJ AM transmitter site, became the faculty adviser. Additionally, Mr. Helvey had the support of Miss Emma Fantone, Coordinator, and Mr. Ted Sheft, Associate Coordinator, of the Audio-Visual Center. They provided the initial studio space for the first WVMS studio in College Hall, the college administration building. Mr. Helvey gained the support of Dr. Thomas Richardson, president of the college, Erik Engel, president, John Van Emden, treasurer and the other officers and student representatives of the Student Government Association, Mr. Gary Leo, Director of Student Activities, the College Life Union Board and the Montclarion. The Voice of Montclair State was also the recipient of the funds raised by the 1966 annual MSC Carnival, providing seed money to get the organization launched. The Student Government Association granted "The Voice of Montclair State"'s petition to be chartered as a Class A organization, which meant that it would receive annual funding from the student activity fees paid by every MSC student. This was the first new Class A chartered organization in over 20 years.

Helvey spent the summer of 1966 exploring the Educational FM channel allocations, working with a communication law firm and broadcast consulting engineers in Washington, DC, to find an available channel in the crowded New York metropolitan broadcast market. The fall 1966 semester found the members of The Voice of Montclair State working on programming ideas and schedules, acquiring equipment including several low power AM transmitters to be installed in MSC dormitories to launch an AM carrier-current station by the beginning of 1967. The transmitters were purchased new from Low Power Broadcasting, Inc., while most of the other studio gear was purchased used, including the original Western Electric broadcast console. The station operated from 6 am until midnight seven days a week during the regular semester. Programming consisted of DJ shows spinning donated records, playback of "live" recorded concerts of campus musical organizations including the campus folk singing group, The Dirdy Birdies, interviews with student leaders, promoting campus activities and other programming of interest to the dormitory population and the few off-campus students who could receive the low power AM signal.

Upon Helvey's graduation, and under the guidance of Les Anderson, vice-chairman; Barbara Faber, business manager; Wendy Burke, recording secretary; Ellen Connelly, corresponding secretary; George Steinmetz, chief engineer and the rest of the staff, WVMS continued to grow.

Helvey's final contribution to WVMS was to negotiate an arrangement with WFMU, at the time the FM campus radio station of Upsala College in East Orange, to broadcast a 27-hour WVMS marathon program over WFMU's station one weekend during the spring 1967 semester. Technical arrangements were made by the engineers at WFMU, the WVMS engineering staff, and the Bell Telephone Company broadcast Tie line division. Many organizations on the Montclair State campus pitched in to create 27 hours of continuous live programming. This programming included a talent show, performances by campus musical groups, interviews, a sports car rally, and various events that allowed the public to learn about Montclair State College and the activities they offer.

Launching The Voice of Montclair State and WVMS was a memorable experience, and was one of the pivotal events of most of the pioneering team's experiences at Montclair State College. In 1974, seven years after the original AM carrier-current station went on the air, Montclair was able to obtain an FM license, over objections from East Hanover Township that it would harm the operation of co-channel high school station WHPH. On December 9, 1974, with the signing on of WMSC, Ed Helvey's original dream had finally been realized.

=== The ‘80s and ‘90s ===
In 1981, WMSC filed to move to 101.5 MHz, having been displaced by changes to adjacent radio station facilities; the move became effective on March 12, 1984. Montclair State prepared for its move into the commercial band by purchasing $32,000 of new equipment and improving its on-air standards. This lasted 10 years until 1994, when, in a controversial decision, the administration of MSC accepted a $50,000 deal from WKXW Trenton (New Jersey 101.5) to move the station back to 90.3. and concerns from Ramapo College over interference to its WRPR. WKXW wanted to reduce interference that WMSC's facility caused to its own broadcasts and had threatened to even petition for the cancellation of the station's license if it did not accept an offer to move. The FCC accepted the application over the objections of Fordham University's WFUV; Press covered up to $25,000 of frequency change-related expenses and donated $100,000 in services, including the ability to rebroadcast news and weather reports from WKXW, in the run-up to the change, which took place in March 1995.

In 1994, Montclair State College became a university; however, the WMSU call letters were already in use by a commercial radio station in Starkville, Mississippi.

=== The 2000s ===
In 2012, WMSC became part of the new Montclair State University's School of Communication and Media. It also moved to new studios on the third floor of Conrad J. Schmitt Hall.

On March 20, 2015, WMSC broadcasts the NCAA Division III Women's Basketball Final Four from Grand Rapids, Michigan. Montclair State, after winning the NJAC for the third season in a row, advanced to the Final Four against George Fox – losing 70 to 58. The Red Hawks then won the national third-place game over Tufts University 56–48.

On September 14, 2015, broadcast executive Anabella Poland joins the WMSC as general manager. Before coming to Montclair State University, Poland was Director of Talent & Industry Relations at SiriusXM Radio where she negotiated and managed interviews, events and performances with A-level Hollywood actors, celebrities and musicians for more than 135 SiriusXM channels.

In January 2016, WMSC struck a distribution deal with iHeartRadio expanding the reach of WMSC as well as increasing visibility and discovery opportunity for the station. iHeartRadio announced in January they had just surpassed 80 million register users. The station changed formats, and dropped their "Underground" branding as the station was no longer in the basement of College Hall, and the moniker was no longer representative of the programming.

On May 26, 2017, founder Ed Helvey and founding members Ellen Harrigan (then known as Ellen Connolly), Helene & Bob Hinck, Les Anderson and WMSC's first ever faculty adviser, Tete H. Tetens, celebrated the 50th anniversary of the station with current general manager, Anabella Poland.

Interest in the campus station from students in every major significantly increased with 159 hours per week programmed and hosted exclusively by students, and only 9 hours per week dedicated to legacy alumni shows. The shift meant that students produce and host for community and public affair programming.

=== Pandemic years ===
On March 6, 2020, the students were at a collegiate conference in New York City when Governor Murphy made an announcement about the pandemic and restrictions. After an extended Spring Break, general manager Anabella Poland and Chief Engineer Adam Goldberg devised a plan to keep the station operational remotely, giving the students the opportunity to broadcast live on WMSC. The station also adapted some shows to be pre-recorded. On March 23, The Morning Buzz went live remotely from each student's home with Poland guiding the sensitive content reporting and Goldberg connecting everyone to the station. WMSC broadcast daily remotely for five months.

In August, the university resumed in person operations, with strong COVID-19 protocols in place. At this time, the station allowed a limited amount of DJs to be in person, and others to submit pre-recorded programming. The Morning Buzz continued programming, this time with a producer in-studio, and hosts and contributors connecting through Zoom.

Program Director Josh Tirado and general manager Anabella Poland redesigned the Apprentice DJ Program, creating instructional videos and providing limited access to the studio for hands-on experience and testing.

In 2022 alone, WMSC engaged more than 700 undergraduate students in the art of radio.

== Notable alumni ==
- Brian Jude, Film & Video Producer/Director/Writer
- Justina Valentine, rapper, MTV Personality

== See also ==
- Montclair State University
