= Kimberly Amato =

American actress and author

- Occupations: Actress, author
- Years active: 1991–present
- Website: www.kimberlyamato.com

Kimberly Amato (born 1976) is an American actress and author.

== Career ==
Kimberly Amato was actress, producer, writer, director and editor for Party Girl (2009) and The Mis-Adventures of McT & A! (2010). The television pilot, "Party Girl", won the Aloha Accolade for Excellence in Filmmaking from the Honolulu Film Awards. Amato is a published author. Her publications include the critically acclaimed Steele Series consisting of Steele Intent, Melting Steele and Breaking Steele.

== Published works ==
- Steele Intent
- Melting Steele
- Breaking Steele
- Cold Steele
- Steele Shield
- Enemy
