= Morris School District =

School district in Morris County, New Jersey, US

Address
- 31 Hazel Street Morristown, Morris County, New Jersey, 07960; United States
- Coordinates: 40.80541°N 74.475909°W

District information
- Grades: PreK–12
- Superintendent: Anne Mucci
- Business administrator: Anthony LoFranco
- Schools: 10

Students and staff
- Enrollment: 5,708 (as of 2023–24)
- Faculty: 457.5 FTEs
- Student–teacher ratio: 12.5:1

Other information
- District Factor Group: GH
- Website: www.morrisschooldistrict.org
Ind.	Per pupil	District spending	Rank (*)	K-12 average	%± vs. average
1A	Total Spending	$20,576	83	$18,891	8.9%
1	Budgetary Cost	15,883	78	14,783	7.4%
2	Classroom Instruction	8,898	60	8,763	1.5%
6	Support Services	3,085	93	2,392	29.0%
8	Administrative Cost	1,511	61	1,485	1.8%
10	Operations & Maintenance	1,916	77	1,783	7.5%
13	Extracurricular Activities	311	75	268	16.0%
16	Median Teacher Salary	70,100	78	64,043
Data from NJDoE 2014 Taxpayers' Guide to Education Spending. *Of K-12 districts with more than 3,500 students. Lowest spending=1; Highest=103

The Morris School District is a comprehensive public school district that serves students in pre-kindergarten through twelfth grade from three municipalities in Morris County, in the U.S. state of New Jersey. The communities in the district are Morristown and Morris Township, along with students from Morris Plains in grades 9-12 who attend the district's high school as part of a sending/receiving relationship with the Morris Plains Schools.

As of the 2023–24 school year, the district, comprised of 10 schools, had an enrollment of 5,708 students and 457.5 classroom teachers (on an FTE basis), for a student–teacher ratio of 12.5:1.

In addition to its PreK–12 program, the Morris School District operates a Community School that offers an extensive adult school curriculum. The Community School also provides a before and after-school childcare program, Sunrise Sunset, for Morris School District children of busy parents. Housed in each of the district's elementary schools, Sunrise Sunset offers a supervised environment in which boys and girls can work and play before and after school. The Community School's summer program, Summer Plus, provides children with a local alternative to summer camp.

== History ==
Two schools are known to have operated in near the Green in Morristown in the 18th century. One was in use from 1732–1767; the other, known as the "Steeple School," stood from 1767 until 1799.

From the early to mid-19th century, local schools included the Franklin Street, Bridge Street, Mt. Kemble, and Washington Valley Schools.

The Maple Avenue School opened in 1869 on land donated by George T. Cobb.

An early, 18th century school, located three miles west of Morristown was described as follows: "The building was constructed of logs, and instead of glass window, sheep skins were stretched over apertures made by sawing off an occasional log.

In 1971, the district was regionalized under an order by the New Jersey Supreme Court that combined the two separate pre-existing districts, which ruled that the Commissioner of the New Jersey Department of Education can cross district lines only for desegregation purposes. The decision found that Morristown and the surrounding Morris Township constituted a "single community without visible or factually significant boundary separations" but that de facto segregation existed because Morristown had a substantial black population while the surrounding township did not. By pairing schools across the two municipalities in the merged district, the district could keep a black population at about 20% of enrollment in each elementary school.

In May 1974, the Harding Township School District was given permission by the State Commissioner of Education to end their sending / receiving relationship with the Morris School District and begin sending their students to Madison High School starting with the 1975-76 school year, ruling that the withdrawal of the mostly white students from Harding Township would not "cause a disproportionate change in the racial composition of Morristown High School".

The district had been classified by the New Jersey Department of Education as being in District Factor Group "GH", the third-highest of eight groupings. District Factor Groups organize districts statewide to allow comparison by common socioeconomic characteristics of the local districts. From lowest socioeconomic status to highest, the categories are A, B, CD, DE, FG, GH, I and J.

== Schools ==
Schools in the district (with 2023–24 enrollment data from the National Center for Education Statistics) are:

Preschool

- Lafayette Learning Center (with 108 students in grade PreK)
  - Jacquelyn Adames, principal

Elementary schools

- Alexander Hamilton School (248; 3–5)
  - Edward Cisneros, principal
- Hillcrest School (268; K–2)
  - Lisa Fischman, principal
- Thomas Jefferson School (305; 3–5)
  - Cristina Frazzano, principal
- Normandy Park School (361; K–5)
  - Christopher Miller, principal
- Sussex Avenue School (336; 3–5)
  - Robert Sparano, interim principal
- Alfred Vail School (334; K–2)
  - Brad Bertani, principal
- Woodland School (293; K–2)
  - Katina Thelemaque, principal

Middle school

- Frelinghuysen Middle School (1,026; 6–8)
  - Vincent Marchese, principal for grade 6
  - Lia Lendis, principal for grades 7 and 8

High school

- Morristown High School (1,856; 9–12)
  - Mark Manning, principal

== Administration ==
Core members of the district's administration are:

- Anne Mucci superintendent
- Anthony LoFranco, business administrator and board secretary

== Board of education ==
The district's board of education, composed of nine members, sets policy and oversees the fiscal and educational operation of the district through its administration. As a Type II school district, the board's trustees are elected directly by voters to serve three-year terms of office on a staggered basis, with three seats up for election each year held (since 2012) as part of the November general election. The board appoints a superintendent to oversee the district's day-to-day operations and a business administrator to supervise the business functions of the district. The nine elected seats on the board of education are allocated based on the population of the constituent municipalities, with five seats assigned to Morris Township and four to Morristown; a tenth representative is appointed by Morris Plains to represent that district's interest on the board.
