= Barry Halper =

Baseball memorabilia collector (1939–2005)

Barry Halper (December 3, 1939 – December 18, 2005) was an extensive collector of baseball memorabilia who had been a limited partner owning about 1% of the New York Yankees in Major League Baseball. During the auction of Halper's collection, Sotheby's called it the "World Series of Sports Auctions."

== Background ==
Halper was born in 1939 and grew up in Newark, New Jersey, living near Ruppert Stadium, home of the Newark Bears, then the Triple-A minor league farm team of the New York Yankees. He attended the University of Miami in Coral Gables, Florida. He then worked in his family's paper supply business until the company closed in 1992.

Halper was close friends with many baseball legends including Joe DiMaggio, Mickey Mantle, Pete Rose, Don Mattingly and Tommy Lasorda, among other professional athletes and coaches, who regularly visited Halper's home to admire the world's most impressive baseball collection. Barry Halper's wife, Sharon cooked special meals for those who came to visit "The Cooperstown of New Jersey" in their Livingston, New Jersey home.

Barry Halper had two other passions: sharing his baseball stories and relationships with the local community at annual round table discussions at Temple B'Nai Abraham in Livingston and The Burn Center at Saint Barnabas Medical Center, also in the city. A member of the hospital's board of directors, he helped raise hundreds of thousands of dollars. When an organization asked to showcase some of his memorabilia at an event, he agree while making one request of the group: to make a donation to the burn center. "He always put that Burn Center at Saint Barnabas above everything else," said Marty Appel the Yankees' former public relations director. "He never had a family member at the unit, he just had a great affection for his hometown hospital where he eventually died at."

A resident of the New Vernon section of Harding Township, New Jersey at the time of his death, Halper had been a longtime resident of Livingston. George Steinbrenner called Halper "a great baseball fan" who was a "dear friend, a valued partner for many years and a decent, genuine person". Barry Halper died at Saint Barnabas Medical Center in Livingston, at the age of 66, in 2005 due to complications from diabetes.

== Collection ==
Halper's baseball memorabilia collection was thought of as the finest, being both extensive and unusual. Many items, such as the uncut strip of T206 cards with a Honus Wagner, were one of a kind. Halper's collection was housed in his basement, which had been outfitted like a small museum, including a hidden switch to a swing open panel, behind which were most of his game-worn jerseys of famous players. The collection of game used jerseys included the only known examples of such players as Pud Galvin, Christy Mathewson, Cap Anson, King Kelly, Dan Brouthers, and the famed trio of Tinker / Evers / Chance. The infamous Joe Jackson was represented with jerseys from his minor league team as well as his Cleveland Indians jersey. The collection of dead ball era player jerseys was unrivaled.

Some of the notable items in Halper's collection included:

- Ty Cobb's 1928 autographed Philadelphia Athletics jersey (sold for over $300,000)
- Lou Gehrig's last baseball glove (sold for nearly $400,000)
- Cap Anson's Chicago White Sox jersey
- A glove from Mickey Mantle (purchased by Billy Crystal for over $230,000)
- Mickey Mantle's 1956 New York Yankees World Series ring.
- The 1920 signed sale agreement which marked Babe Ruth's sale by the Boston Red Sox, to the Yankees
- A 1903 ticket to the first World Series
- Lou Gehrig's 1930's Yankees hat
- Cobb's dentures
- King Kelly's New York Giants jersey
- Christy Mathewson's first minor league jersey (Taunton)

After the Sotheby's auction, Halper remarked:

It makes me feel so proud that my collection will be carried on by everyone who participated in the past week's sale. I am also glad that the Hall of Fame has part of my collection where it will reside in perpetuity.

Sotheby's released a three-volume book, The Barry Halper Collection of Baseball Memorabilia, including over 1,500 color photographs of the collection, giving history for many of the items, details about Halper's collection through the years, and a history of baseball. In 1998, Halper sold the collection, with MLB purchasing many items, donating them to the Baseball Hall of Fame in Cooperstown, New York. The rest was auctioned off by Sotheby's for a record $21.8 million.

=== Controversy and allegations of false provenance ===
In October 2010, Hall of Fame spokesman Brad Horn told the New York Post that a Halper-donated jersey, supposedly worn by Shoeless Joe Jackson, was a fake. Horn said that the logo utilized acrylic coloring first created in 1941. The jersey was removed from display in 2008. Halper gave conflicting statements regarding the provenance of the Jackson jersey. In a 1985 interview, Halper told The Sporting News that it was a “recent acquisition” from Jackson’s family. In 1998, Halper claimed he’d purchased it in the 1950s from Jackson’s widow. There have been issues of authenticity with other auctioned items, including items purported to belong to Cy Young, Joe Dimaggio, Mickey Mantle, Ty Cobb, and others.

Subsequent reports alleged that certain items in Halper's collection, at some prior unknown time, had been stolen from the Baseball Hall of Fame, the New York Public Library, or other institutions. There have been allegations that items in his collection were stolen from the widows or family members of deceased baseball stars.

The accusations have been made primarily by Peter Nash, a rapper-turned-memorabilia collector, culminating in an article which Nash wrote for the New York Post in July 2011. Murray Chass, the long-time baseball writer for The New York Times and personal acquaintance of Halper, opined that Nash's article in the New York Post was "journalistically indefensible" and "defamed the late Barry Halper." Nash's credibility and motivations against Halper have been questioned, given that he has been involved in a long-running litigation with the memorabilia auction house which was instrumental in preparing, organizing, and cataloging Halper's memorabilia auction at Sotheby's in 1999. In the litigation, Nash admitted in court papers to committing fraud against the auction house, and he invoked the Fifth Amendment in response to questions about his own memorabilia transactions to avoid incriminating himself. The court found in favor of the auction house owner, and Nash signed a court order in which he admitted to having committed fraud. The New York Post published some of Nash's accusations, but they have since removed Nash's original article from its website.
