= Jim Weaver (chef) =

American chef

Jim Weaver is a chef, an author, and a pioneer in the Slow Food movement in New Jersey. Weaver owned Tre Piani, which is now closed, an Italian restaurant in the Forrestal Village section of Plainsboro, New Jersey, near US Route 1. In 2004, he served as New Jersey's representative to the first Great American Seafood Cook-off at the Morial Convention Center in New Orleans, Louisiana. Several years later, Weaver published his first book, Locavore Adventures: One Chef's Slow Food Journey. Locavore Adventures discusses his experiences with learning to use local ingredients in cooking.

== Early life and education ==
Weaver was born in New Vernon, a community in Harding Township, New Jersey. His family lived in a house built by his father in a wooded area of the town. In 1981, Weaver graduated from Morristown-Beard School in Morristown, New Jersey. He then completed his bachelor's degree at New Hampshire College (now Southern New Hampshire University) in Manchester, New Hampshire, in 1985. Taking after his father, Weaver initially chose to study architecture in college. After taking a few classes in that subject, he switched his major to hotel and restaurant management.

In 1991, Weaver took a trip to Italy that helped him learning cooking techniques. He learned to cook seafood under the tutelage of a chef at La Guzzina in Milan. During the trip, Weaver also practiced cooking multi-course meals while staying with friends in Rome. They purchased the ingredients for the meals at the marketplace at Campo de' Fiori.

== Cooking career ==
Weaver served as the executive chef at Panico's in New Brunswick, New Jersey, from 1989 to 1998. He then founded Tre Piani, where he rose again to become one of the areas best chefs.

While working at Panico's, Weaver experimented with a new style of Italian cuisine, which later became the mainstay of Tre Piani. He sought to make heavy use of fresh, locally grown ingredients from nearby farms in New Jersey.

While running his restaurant, Weaver has volunteered in cooking activities to reduce childhood hunger. He has held Taste of the Nation events at Tre Piani to benefit Share Our Strength, a national nonprofit organization that focuses on reducing childhood hunger. In 2003, Share Our Strength awarded Weaver their Chef of the Year Award.

== Slow Food movement in New Jersey ==
In 1999, Weaver founded Slow Food Central New Jersey as Slow Food International's sixth U.S. chapter. In August of that year, he held an event at Tre Piani called Har-Fest. Weaver invited chefs at local restaurants in New Jersey to offer free tastings of food made using local, seasonal ingredients. The event, which amassed a crowd of 500 people, included tomato farmers, cheese producers, beekeepers, and cranberry producers. The event helped convince Slow Food international to invest in the growth of Slow Food USA, which started in 2000.
