= Harding Township, New Jersey =

Township in Morris County, New Jersey, US

- Township
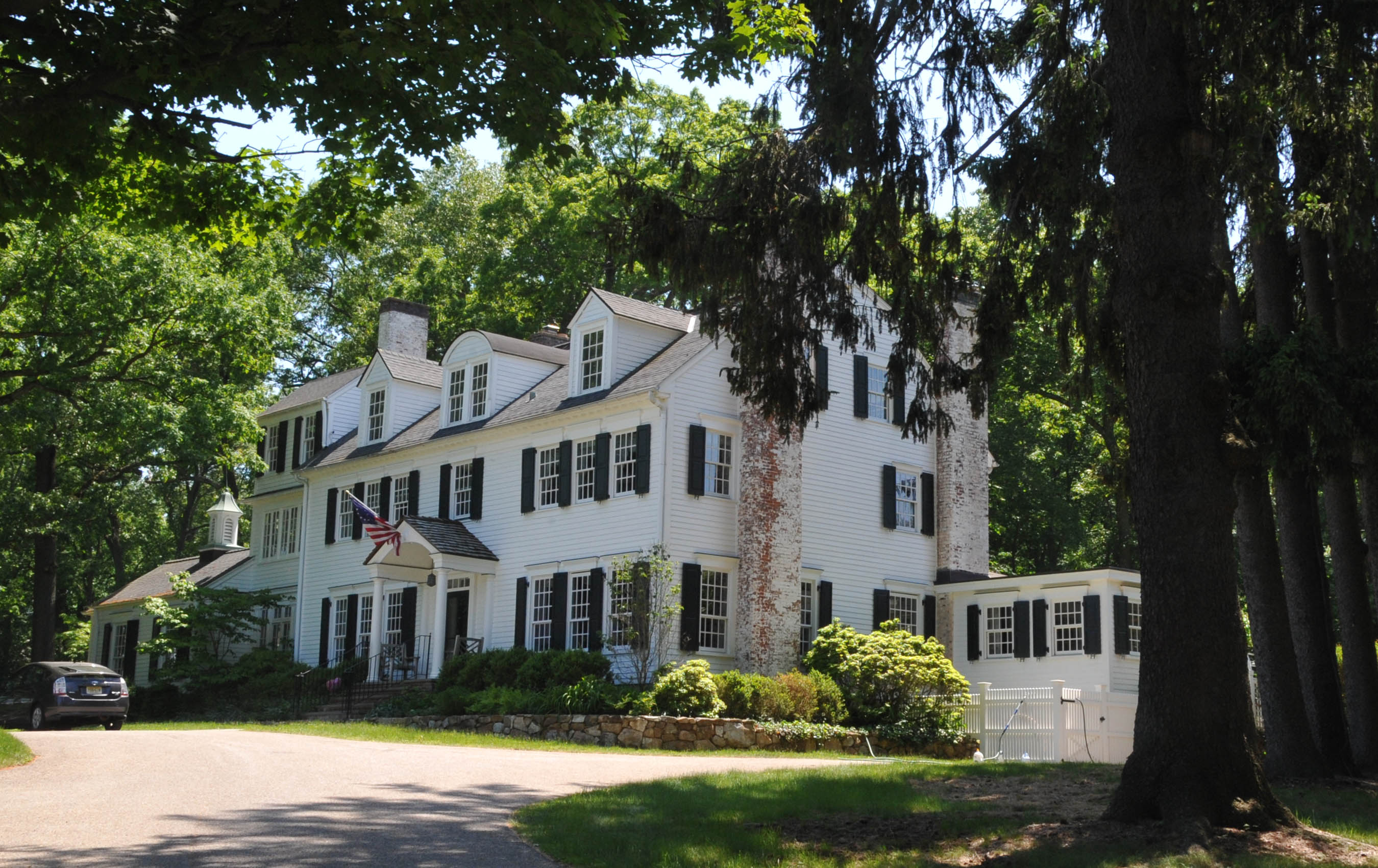
- Hartley Farms

- Location of Harding Township in Morris County highlighted in red (right). Inset map: Location of Morris County in New Jersey highlighted in orange (left).

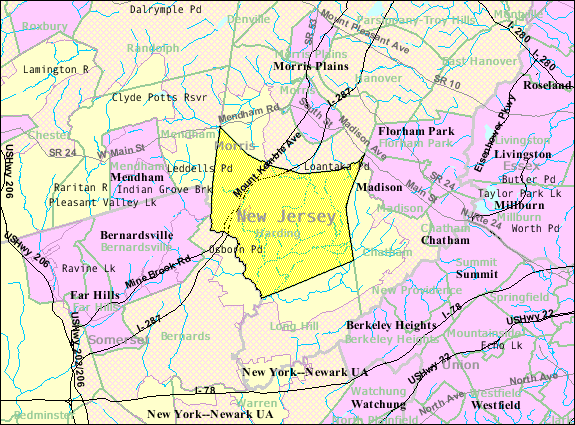
- Census Bureau map of Harding Township, New Jersey

- Location in Morris County Location in New Jersey Location in the United States
- Coordinates: 40.737825°N 74.495335°W
- Country: United States
- State: New Jersey
- County: Morris
- Incorporated: September 1, 1922
- Named for: Warren G. Harding

Government
  - Type: Township
  - Body: Township Committee
  - Mayor: Timothy D. Jones (R, term ends December 31, 2023)
  - Administrator: Robert Falzarano
  - Municipal clerk: Lisa A. Sharp

Area
  - Total: 20.57 sq mi (53.28 km^{2})
  - Land: 20.05 sq mi (51.94 km^{2})
  - Water: 0.52 sq mi (1.34 km^{2}) 2.51%
  - Rank: 140th of 565 in state 9th of 39 in county
- Elevation: 367 ft (112 m)

Population (2020)
  - Total: 3,871
  - Estimate (2023): 3,891
  - Rank: 417th of 565 in state 36th of 39 in county
  - Density: 193/sq mi (75/km^{2})
  - Rank: 506th of 565 in state 39th of 39 in county
- Time zone: UTC−05:00 (EST)
  - Summer (DST): UTC−04:00 (EDT)
- ZIP Code: 07935 – Green Village; 07976 – New Vernon
- Area code: 973
- FIPS code: 3402729700
- GNIS feature ID: 0882195
- Website: www.hardingnj.org

Harding Township is a township in Morris County, in the U.S. state of New Jersey. It is located in the Passaic Valley region within the New York metropolitan area. The township was formed as a township by an act of the New Jersey Legislature on September 1, 1922, from portions of Passaic Township (since renamed as Long Hill Township), based on the results of a referendum passed on May 9, 1922. As of the 2020 United States census, the township's population was 3,871, an increase of 33 (+0.9%) from the 2010 census count of 3,838, which in turn reflected an increase of 658 (+20.7%) from the 3,180 counted in the 2000 census.

The long-established hamlets of New Vernon and Green Village (also within Chatham Township) are both located in Harding Township. The township is home to the private club community Mount Kemble Lake, a former summer colony developed in the 1920s.

Described by The New York Times as "one of the most restrictive and elegant of New Jersey's residential suburban areas" and as an "affluent Morris County township", the community has been one of the state's highest-income municipalities. Harding Township had a per capita income of $109,472 and was ranked first in New Jersey based on data from the 2006–2010 American Community Survey from the United States Census Bureau, more than triple the statewide average of $34,858. Based on data from the ACS for 2014–2018, Harding Township ranked sixth in the state with a median household income of $183,587 and had almost half of households earning more than $200 thousand annually.

The 07976 ZIP Code for New Vernon was named one of the "25 Richest ZIP Codes" in the United States by Forbes magazine in 2006. Many relatively unchanged large country estates that have been passed down through several generations attest to the wealth of many of its residents. Some have been listed on the National Register of Historic Places and some have nonprofit support organizations that assure the retention of the original nature of the properties.

As of 2021, the median value of a home in Harding Township lies at $1,181,000.

== History ==
After the retreat of the Wisconsin Glacier, a mighty glacial lake called Glacial Lake Passaic formed in this area that, about 15,000 to 11,000 years ago, extended for 30 miles (48 km) in length and was 10 miles (16 km) wide. The lake finally drained when a blockage of the Passaic River reopened. The Great Swamp is the remnant of the lake bottom and portions of the swamp lay in what now is the township. Once the lake drained, higher areas became a wooded area that was used for hunting, fishing, and farming by Native Americans. At the time of colonization by the Dutch it belonged to the Lenape tribes, but British colonists did their best to displace them westward.

Much of what now is known as Harding was an agricultural community with roots stretching as far back as the early 18th century. Bypassed by colonial turnpikes, revolution era canals, and railroads laid in the Victorian era, the area remained a rural backwater. For almost two centuries of European occupation, its open and rolling landscapes reflected its agricultural use, as land had been cleared for cattle pastures, orchards, and fields of grain. The Great Swamp, the wooded slopes of the Watchung Mountains, and those near Jockey Hollow also were used by local farmers for wood supply. The communities of Green Village, Logansville, New Vernon, and Pleasantville were the village centers in this agricultural community.

Wealthy urban residents from Manhattan and Newark bought farmland, enlarged old farmhouses, and landscaped the grounds. The movement to establish Harding Township was driven by local property owners who wanted to maintain a bucolic community without suburban development.

The township was created in 1922 from the northern half of what was then Passaic Township (present day Long Hill Township) and it was named after the incumbent President of the United States, Warren G. Harding.

The New Vernon Neighborhood Restrictive Agreement was established in 1928 by estate owners under which they agreed to voluntarily place restrictive covenants on their land that would require future owners of the properties to maintain the rural nature of the area. This voluntary effort to limit development and save the pastoral qualities of over 1,000 acres (4.0 km^{2}) across Harding Township influenced subsequent zoning codes, which emerged several decades later, and helped preserve the landscape to the present day.

== Geography ==
According to the United States Census Bureau, the township had a total area of 20.57 square miles (53.28 km^{2}), including 20.05 square miles (51.94 km^{2}) of land and 0.52 square miles (1.34 km^{2}) of water (2.51%). The township includes unincorporated communities, a portion of Green Village and all of New Vernon, both of which have origins as colonial settlements that predate the American Revolution. The governmental offices for the township are in New Vernon.

Other unincorporated communities, localities and place names located partially or completely within the township include Baileys Mill, Dickson Mill, Glen Alpin, Jockey Hollow Park, Logansville, Mount Kemble Lake, Olmstead Mills, Osborn Mill, Pleasantville, Sugar Loaf and Van Dorens Mill.

The township borders Mendham Township to the west, Madison to the northeast, Chatham Township to the east, Morris Township to the north, and Long Hill Township to the southeast in Morris County and Bernardsville to the southwest and Bernards Township to the south in Somerset County.

== Demographics ==
=== Population ===
Historical population
Census	Pop.	Note	%±
1930	1,206		—
1940	1,565		29.8%
1950	1,970		25.9%
1960	2,683		36.2%
1970	3,249		21.1%
1980	3,236		−0.4%
1990	3,640		12.5%
2000	3,180		−12.6%
2010	3,838		20.7%
2020	3,871		0.9%
2023 (est.)	3,891		0.5%
Population sources: 1930 1940–2000; 2000 2010 2020

=== 2010 census ===
The 2010 United States census counted 3,838 people, 1,474 households, and 1,126 families in the township. The population density was 192.7 per square mile (74.4/km^{2}). There were 1,610 housing units at an average density of 80.8 per square mile (31.2/km^{2}). The racial makeup was 94.14% (3,613) White, 0.99% (38) Black or African American, 0.13% (5) Native American, 2.66% (102) Asian, 0.00% (0) Pacific Islander, 0.34% (13) from other races, and 1.75% (67) from two or more races. Hispanic or Latino of any race were 3.49% (134) of the population.

Of the 1,474 households, 31.2% had children under the age of 18; 68.7% were married couples living together; 5.7% had a female householder with no husband present and 23.6% were non-families. Of all households, 20.6% were made up of individuals and 10.2% had someone living alone who was 65 years of age or older. The average household size was 2.60 and the average family size was 3.00.

24.0% of the population were under the age of 18, 4.8% from 18 to 24, 14.5% from 25 to 44, 35.8% from 45 to 64, and 21.0% who were 65 years of age or older. The median age was 48.9 years. For every 100 females, the population had 93.7 males. For every 100 females ages 18 and older there were 93.1 males.

The Census Bureau's 2006–2010 American Community Survey showed that (in 2010 inflation-adjusted dollars) median household income was $168,365 (with a margin of error of +/− $37,371) and the median family income was $185,647 (+/− $30,739). Males had a median income of $123,854 (+/− $38,454) versus $66,131 (+/− $25,727) for females. The per capita income for the borough was $109,472 (+/− $24,951). About 6.8% of families and 7.5% of the population were below the poverty line, including 13.5% of those under age 18 and 3.3% of those age 65 or over.

=== 2000 census ===
As of the 2000 United States census there were 3,180 people, 1,180 households, and 940 families residing in the township. The population density was 155.6 inhabitants per square mile (60.1/km^{2}). There were 1,243 housing units at an average density of 60.8 per square mile (23.5/km^{2}). The racial makeup of the township was 97.20% White, 0.41% African American, 1.07% Asian, 0.03% Pacific Islander, 0.22% from other races, and 1.07% from two or more races. Hispanic or Latino of any race were 1.79% of the population.

There were 1,180 households, out of which 32.6% had children under the age of 18 living with them, 72.3% were married couples living together, 5.2% had a female householder with no husband present, and 20.3% were non-families. 17.6% of all households were made up of individuals, and 8.5% had someone living alone who was 65 years of age or older. The average household size was 2.69 and the average family size was 3.03.

In the township the population was spread out, with 25.2% under the age of 18, 3.6% from 18 to 24, 21.9% from 25 to 44, 32.9% from 45 to 64, and 16.4% who were 65 years of age or older. The median age was 44 years. For every 100 females, there were 93.9 males. For every 100 females age 18 and over, there were 91.9 males.

The median income for a household in the township was $111,297, and the median income for a family was $128,719. Males had a median income of $95,737 versus $57,308 for females. The per capita income for the township was $72,689. None of the families and 1.1% of the population were living below the poverty line, including none under eighteen and 3.3% of those over 64.

== Government ==
=== Local government ===
Harding Township is governed under the Township form of New Jersey municipal government, one of 141 municipalities (of the 564 statewide) that use this form, the second-most commonly used form of government in the state. The Township Committee is comprised of five members, who are elected directly by the voters at-large in partisan elections to serve three-year terms of office on a staggered basis, with either one or two seats coming up for election each year as part of the November general election in a three-year cycle. At an annual reorganization meeting held during the first week of January, the Township Committee selects one of its members to serve as Mayor and another as Deputy Mayor, each serving terms of one year.

Eleven standing committees are appointed at the reorganization meeting including planning, zoning and legal; finance and insurance; public safety; public works and building; personnel; recreation commission; freeholder liaison; Glen Alpin Steering liaison; school board liaison; open space liaison; and board of health liaison. Two members of the township committee serve on each standing committee and provide oversight to the departments.

As of 2023, members of the Harding Township Committee are Mayor Timothy D. Jones (R, term on committee ends December 31, 2024; term as mayor ends 2023), Deputy Mayor Rita Chipperson (R, term on committee and as deputy mayor ends 2023), Nicole Lacz (R, 2024), Nicolas Platt (R, 2025) and Christopher M. Yates (R, 2023).

=== Federal, state and county representation ===
Harding Township is located in the 11th Congressional District and is part of New Jersey's 25th state legislative district.

For the 119th United States Congress, New Jersey's 11th congressional district is represented by Analilia Mejia (D, Glen Ridge) who was elected in a 2026 special election to serve for the remainder of the Congress following the resignation Mikie Sherrill (D, Montclair), who was elected Governor of New Jersey in 2025. New Jersey is represented in the United States Senate by Democrats Cory Booker (Newark, term ends 2027) and Andy Kim (Moorestown, term ends 2031).

For the 2026–2027 session, the 25th legislative district of the New Jersey Legislature is represented in the State Senate by Anthony M. Bucco (R, Boonton Township) and in the General Assembly by Aura K. Dunn (R, Mendham Borough) and Marisa Sweeney (D, Morristown).

Morris County is governed by a Board of County Commissioners comprised of seven members who are elected at-large in partisan elections to three-year terms on a staggered basis, with either one or three seats up for election each year as part of the November general election. Actual day-to-day operation of departments is supervised by County Administrator Deena Leary.

As of 2026, Morris County's Commissioners (with all terms ending December 31) are Director Stephen H. Shaw (R, Mountain Lakes, 2027), Deputy Director John Krickus (R, Washington Township, 2027), Douglas Cabana (R, Boonton Township, 2028), Thomas J. Mastrangelo (R, Montville, 2028), Christine Myers (R, Harding Township, 2028), Tayfun Selen (R, Chatham Township, 2026), and Deborah Smith (R, Denville Township, 2027).

The county's constitutional officers are County Clerk Ann F. Grossi (R, Parsippany–Troy Hills, 2028), Sheriff James M. Gannon (R, Boonton Township, 2025) and Surrogate Heather Darling (R, Roxbury, 2029).

=== Politics ===
United States presidential election results for Harding Township 2024 2020 2016 2012 2008 2004
Year	Republican		Democratic		Third party(ies)	
Year	No.	%	No.	%	No.	%
2024	1,456	54.55%	1,172	43.91%	41	1.54%
2020	1,491	52.15%	1,338	46.80%	30	1.05%
2016	1,309	55.02%	969	40.73%	101	4.25%
2012	1,607	70.39%	654	28.65%	22	0.96%
2008	1,516	62.21%	898	36.85%	23	0.94%
2004	1,618	66.97%	778	32.20%	20	0.83%

As of March 2011, there were a total of 3,025 registered voters in Harding Township, of which 466 (15.4%) were registered as Democrats, 1,443 (47.7%) were registered as Republicans and 1,115 (36.9%) were registered as Unaffiliated. There was one voter registered to another party.

In the 2012 presidential election, Republican Mitt Romney received 70.4% of the vote (1,607 cast), ahead of Democrat Barack Obama with 28.6% (654 votes), and other candidates with 1.0% (22 votes), among the 2,295 ballots cast by the township's 3,195 registered voters (12 ballots were spoiled), for a turnout of 71.8%. In the 2008 presidential election, Republican John McCain received 61.9% of the vote (1,516 cast), ahead of Democrat Barack Obama with 36.7% (898 votes) and other candidates with 0.9% (23 votes), among the 2,449 ballots cast by the township's 3,139 registered voters, for a turnout of 78.0%. In the 2004 presidential election, Republican George W. Bush received 66.8% of the vote (1,618 ballots cast), outpolling Democrat John Kerry with 32.1% (778 votes) and other candidates with 0.7% (20 votes), among the 2,421 ballots cast by the township's 3,040 registered voters, for a turnout percentage of 79.6.

Gubernatorial election results for Harding Township
Year	Republican		Democratic		Third party(ies)	
Year	No.	%	No.	%	No.	%
2025	1,313	58.15%	941	41.67%	4	0.18%
2021	1,207	63.73%	671	35.43%	16	0.84%
2017	998	65.74%	500	32.94%	20	1.32%
2013	1,193	82.05%	242	16.64%	19	1.31%
2009	1,280	68.60%	384	20.58%	202	10.83%
2005	1,138	69.43%	479	29.23%	22	1.34%

In the 2013 gubernatorial election, Republican Chris Christie received 82.0% of the vote (1,193 cast), ahead of Democrat Barbara Buono with 16.6% (242 votes), and other candidates with 1.3% (19 votes), among the 1,476 ballots cast by the township's 3,200 registered voters (22 ballots were spoiled), for a turnout of 46.1%. In the 2009 gubernatorial election, Republican Chris Christie received 68.4% of the vote (1,280 ballots cast), ahead of Democrat Jon Corzine with 20.5% (384 votes), Independent Chris Daggett with 10.5% (197 votes) and other candidates with 0.3% (5 votes), among the 1,871 ballots cast by the township's 3,099 registered voters, yielding a 60.4% turnout.

United States Senate election results for Harding Township1
Year	Republican		Democratic		Third party(ies)	
Year	No.	%	No.	%	No.	%
2024	1,555	59.04%	1,055	40.05%	24	0.91%
2018	1,439	64.70%	729	32.78%	56	2.52%
2012	1,543	71.01%	610	28.07%	20	0.92%
2006	1,239	70.32%	506	28.72%	17	0.96%

United States Senate election results for Harding Township2
Year	Republican		Democratic		Third party(ies)	
Year	No.	%	No.	%	No.	%
2020	1,659	58.56%	1,162	41.02%	12	0.42%
2014	972	71.89%	370	27.37%	10	0.74%
2013	737	66.52%	369	33.30%	2	0.18%
2008	1,606	70.44%	658	28.86%	16	0.70%

== Education ==
The Harding Township School District serves public school students in pre-kindergarten through eighth grade at Harding Township School. As of the 2021–22 school year, the district, comprised of one school, had an enrollment of 299 students and 41.2 classroom teachers (on an FTE basis), for a student–teacher ratio of 7.3:1.

For ninth through twelfth grades, public school students attend Madison High School in Madison, as part of a sending/receiving relationship with the Madison Public Schools. As of the 2021–22 school year, the high school had an enrollment of 839 students and 69.6 classroom teachers (on an FTE basis), for a student–teacher ratio of 12.1:1.

== Historic district ==
The Tempe Wick Road–Washington Corners Historic District is a 353-acre (143 ha) historic district located in Harding Township and Mendham Township. It extends along Tempe Wick Road from Mount Kemble Avenue to Cold Hill Road, and short segments of Corey Lane, Cemetery Road, Kennaday Road, Leddell Road, and Jockey Hollow Road. Tempe Wick Road is named for Temperance Wick.

The district was added to the National Register of Historic Places on August 25, 2000, for its significance in architecture and military history. The district includes 44 contributing buildings, 6 contributing sites, 10 contributing structures, and 4 contributing objects.

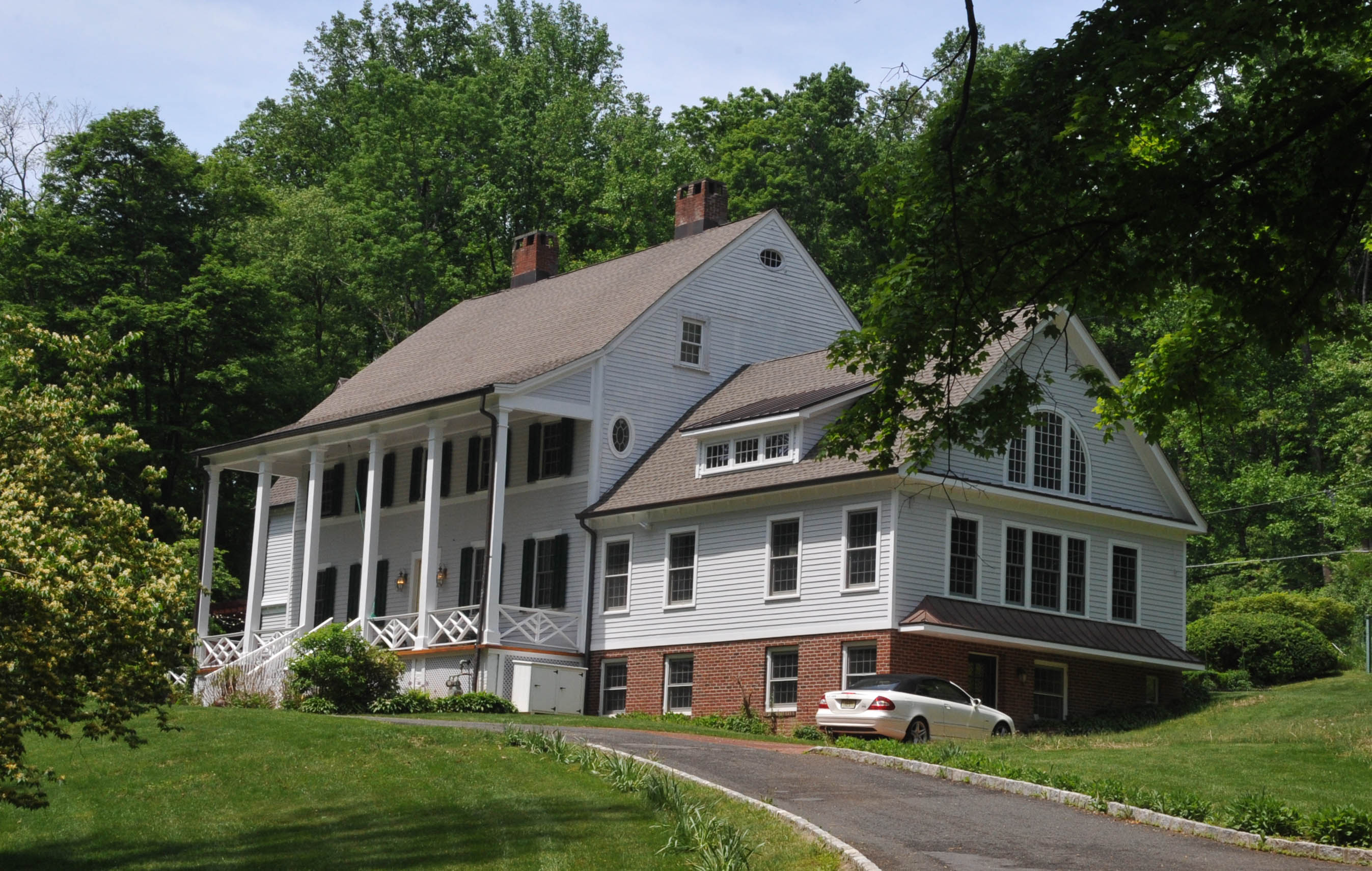
Peter Kemble House

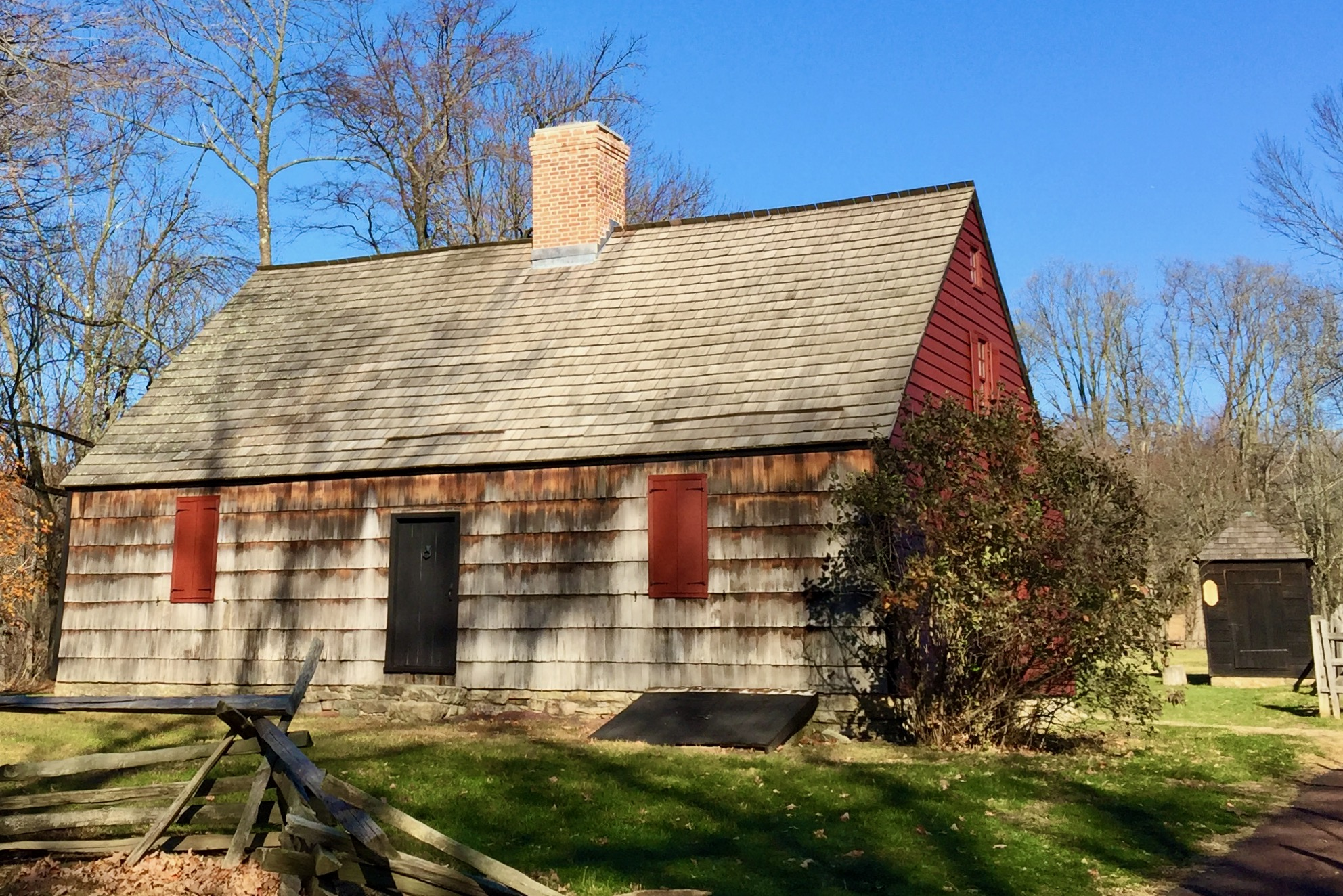
Tempe Wick House at Jockey Hollow

== Transportation ==
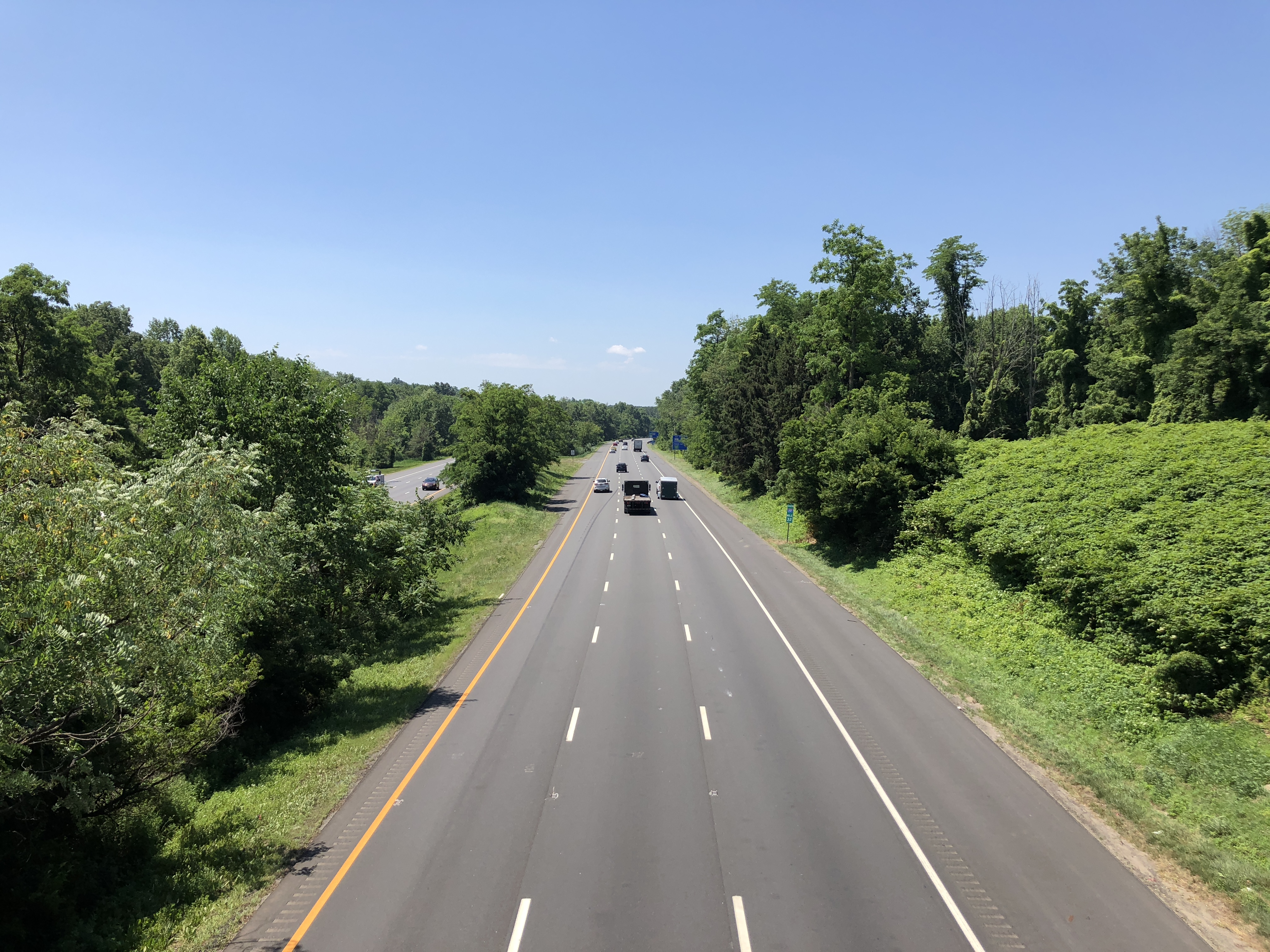
Interstate 287 southbound in Harding Township

=== Roads and highways ===
As of May 2010, the township had a total of 47.82 miles (76.96 km) of roadways, of which 26.48 miles (42.62 km) were maintained by the municipality, 14.69 miles (23.64 km) by Morris County and 6.65 miles (10.70 km) by the New Jersey Department of Transportation.

Interstate 287 is the most prominent highway within Harding Township, though there are no exits within the township. The nearest exits, 30 and 33, are both just outside the township in neighboring Bernards Township and Morris Township, respectively. U.S. Route 202 is the main highway providing local access to Harding Township.

=== Public transportation ===
Many Harding residents commute to jobs in Manhattan. There are private van shuttles that make the 45-minute trip to Jersey City or Hoboken, where ferries and PATH make the short journey across the Hudson River to Lower Manhattan. Additionally, many residents use the Madison, Morristown, and other nearby train stations to commute to Midtown Manhattan.

NJ Transit had provided local bus service on the MCM8 route until 2010, when subsidies were eliminated to the local service provider as part of budget cuts.

== Notable people ==
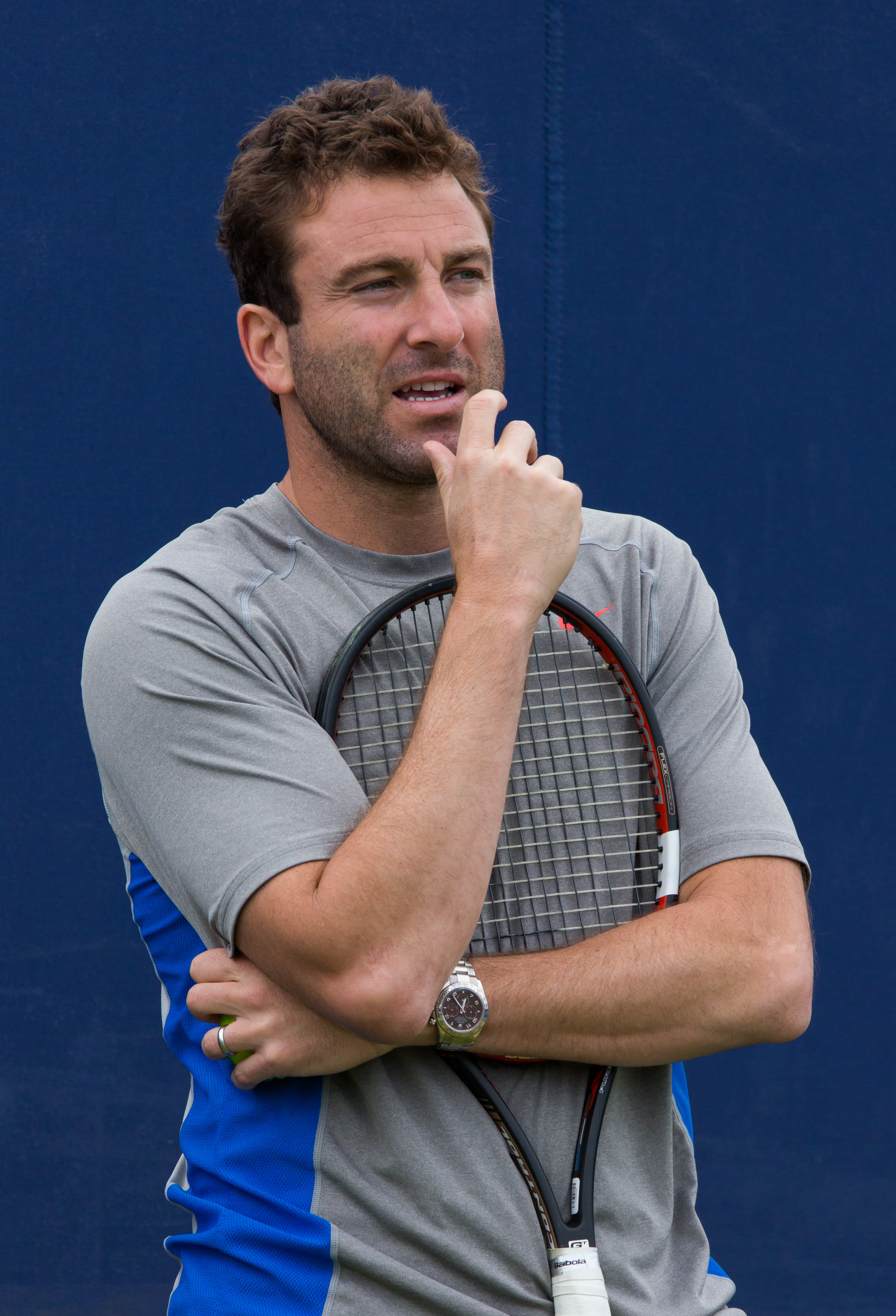
Justin Gimelstob

People who were born in, residents of, or otherwise closely associated with Harding Township include:

- William O. Baker (1915–2005), former head of Bell Labs
- James J. Barry Jr. (born 1946), politician who served in the New Jersey General Assembly and was Director of the New Jersey Division of Consumer Affairs
- Michelle Cesan (born 1991), field hockey player who competed for the United States women's national field hockey team in the women's event at the 2012 Summer Olympics
- Ray Chambers (born 1942), UN Special Envoy for Malaria
- Steve Conine (born 1972/73), co-founder of the online retailer Wayfair
- Ned Crotty (born 1986), professional lacrosse player with the Chrome Lacrosse Club of the Premier Lacrosse League
- Marcellus Hartley Dodge Sr. (1881–1963), lived at Hartley Farms, a large estate in New Vernon, from the time he was married
- Regina Egea, Chief of Staff to Governor Chris Christie
- Peter Frelinghuysen Jr. (1916–2011), politician who represented New Jersey's 5th congressional district in the United States House of Representatives from 1953 to 1975
- Rodney Frelinghuysen (born 1946), politician who represented New Jersey's 11th congressional district from 1995 to 2019
- Justin Gimelstob (born 1977), professional tennis player
- Barry Halper (1939–2005), extensive collector of baseball memorabilia who had been a limited partner owning about 1% of the New York Yankees
- Kerry Kittles (born 1974), former professional basketball player
- Eric Mangini (born 1971), former head coach of the New York Jets
- Josephine Margetts (1901–1989), politician who served as a member of the New Jersey General Assembly from 1967 to 1973.
- Bart Oates (born 1958), former professional football player who played for the New York Giants
- Morgan Pearson (born 1993), professional triathlete who won a silver medal in the mixed relay event at the 2020 Summer Olympics
- William E. Simon (1927–2000), United States Secretary of the Treasury for Nixon and Ford
- Bo Sullivan (1937–2000), chairman of the New Jersey Turnpike Authority and a Republican Party politician who sought the nomination for Governor of New Jersey in the 1981 primary
- Jim Weaver, chef, author and a pioneer in the Slow Food movement
- Greeley Wells (1920–2014), businessman, Marine Corps veteran who participated in the first raising of the U.S. flag on Iwo Jima and mayor of Harding Township
