= CustomMade =

Online custom jeweler

- Company type: Online Jeweler
- Founded: 1996
- Headquarters: Current Headquarters: Cambridge, Massachusetts
- Key people: Seth Rosen, Founder and CEO
- Products: Furniture, Jewelry, Home Decor
- Number of employees: 3500
- Website: custommade.com

CustomMade is an online custom jeweler. Until 2015, The business was operated as an online marketplace, where people were able to buy custom-designed furniture, jewelry, home décor, and other personalized items by independent artisans. Company raised a total of $7.65 million in venture funding.

On May 21, 2015, the business was acquired by Wayfair (NYSE: W) for an undisclosed sum after raising $25.65MM in venture funding.

In May 2017, it was announced that founder Seth Rosen had re-purchased the business out of foreclosure, in partnership with Western Technology Investment (WTI), to focus on building the custom jewelry business.

== Company History ==
=== Beginnings ===
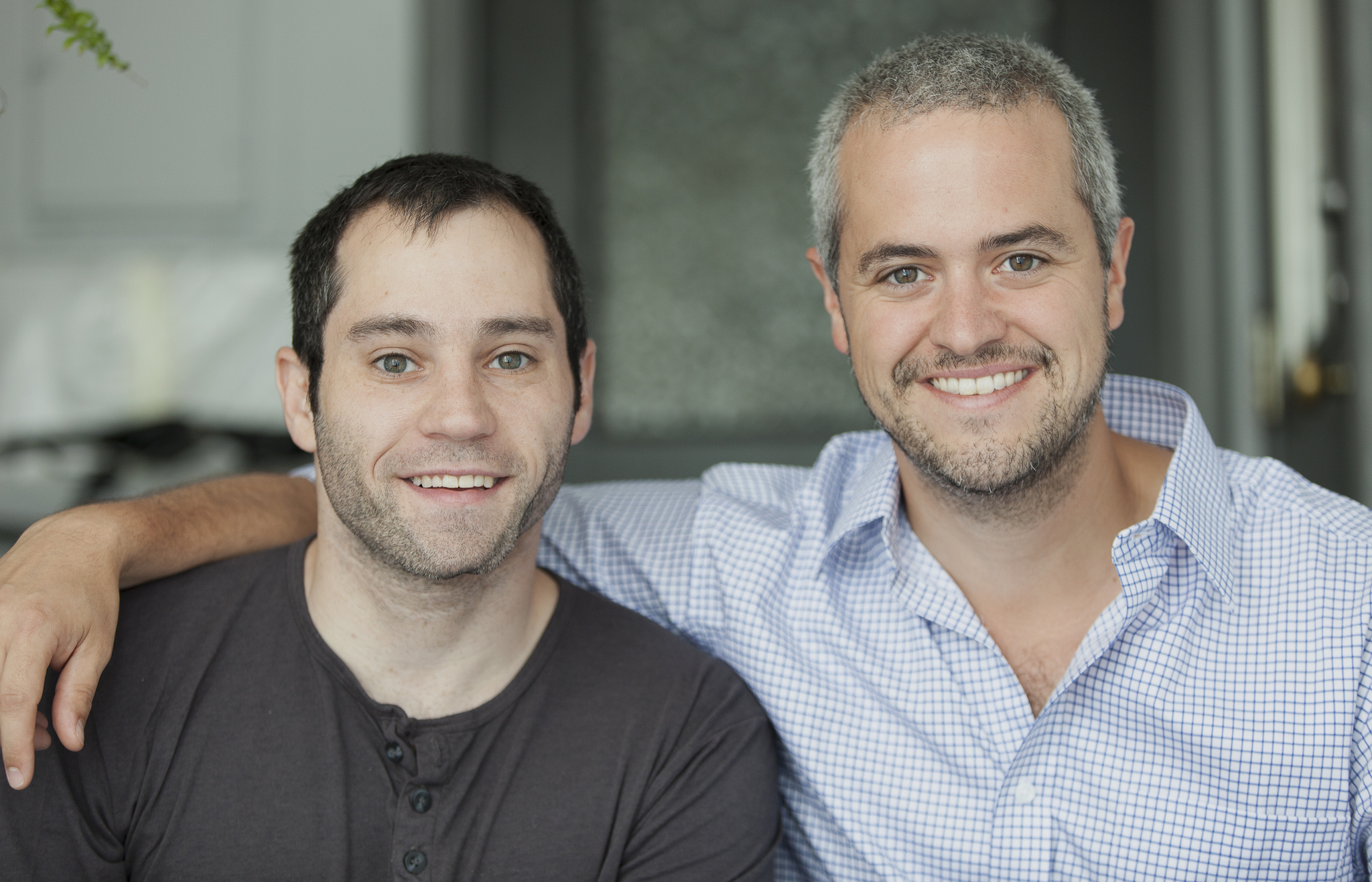
CustomMade co-founders Michael Salguero and Seth Rosen

Co-founders Michael Salguero and Seth Rosen met as undergraduates at Boston University. Both had an interest in custom-made shirts, belts, and pants. After working in real estate, they changed careers. In January 2009, Salguero and Rosen bought the custommade.com URL for $140,000 from a woodworker who had owned and run the site since 1996. At the time of the purchase, the site hosted around 350 makers paying a small subscription fee to be on the site. The site was generating about $35,000 a year in subscription sales.

Early versions of CustomMade.com drew visitors, but only a small number of those visitors ordered items. CustomMade redesigned the site with help from Google Ventures and within a week, increased the number of paying projects by 200 percent. From 2009 to 2010, the number of visitors to the site tripled to a total of 1.5 million. In 2010 CustomMade earned $350,000 in revenue.

In November 2011, CustomMade raised $2.1 million in Series A funding from First Round Capital, Google Ventures, and others. With the additional investment, CustomMade planned to expand its Lechmere Square headquarters by 5,000 square feet and its number of employees from 27 to over 50. At the time of the announcement, CustomMade had produced over $2 million in project requests.

In April 2012, CustomMade closed a $4 million funding round led by Google Ventures, with additional investments from Schooner Capital, LaunchCapital, NextView Ventures, Andrew McCollum, and First Round Capital.

=== Business Model ===
In May 2017, CustomMade made the decision to focus exclusively on its custom jewelry design and manufacturing business.
