= Steve Conine =

American businessman

- Born: Steven K. Conine; 1972 or 1973 (age 52–53)
- Education: Cornell University (BE)
- Occupation: Businessman
- Known for: Co-founder and co-chairman, Wayfair
- Spouse: Alexi Conine
- Children: 3

Steven K. Conine (born 1972/73) is an American businessman, and the co-chairman and co-founder (with Niraj Shah) of the online retailer Wayfair.

== Early life ==
Raised in the New Vernon section of Harding Township, New Jersey, Conine spent some time during his teens working at a pair of outdoor furniture stores his mother operated. Conine graduated from Delbarton School in 1991. He went on to attend Cornell University, where he earned a bachelor's degree in mechanical engineering in 1995.

== Career ==
Conine co-founded Wayfair in 2002, and is the co-chairman of the board.

In May 2017, Wayfair's share price rose above $70 per share, making Conine and his co-founder Niraj Shah both billionaires. As of 2019, each had an estimated net worth of $2.3 billion.

== Personal life ==
Conine is married to Alexi, they have three children and live in Boston, Massachusetts. They have a holiday home in Jackson Hole, Wyoming.
