= Niraj Shah =

American businessman (born 1973/74)

- Born: 1973 or 1974 (age 51–52)
- Education: Cornell University (BE)
- Occupation: Businessman
- Known for: Co-founder, co-chairman & CEO, Wayfair
- Board member of: Wayfair
- Spouse: Jill Shah
- Children: 2

Niraj S. Shah (born 1973/1974) is an American businessman, and co-founder, co-chairman, and CEO of online retailer Wayfair.

== Early life ==
Shah grew up in Pittsfield, Massachusetts, the son of immigrants from India. His grandfather ran a "steel manufacturing business in India, making pots and pans". His father worked for General Electric as a mechanical engineer, and after his retirement, joined Wayfair early on, providing financial advice, and still works for the company.

Shah graduated from Cornell University, where he earned a bachelor's degree in engineering in 1995.

== Career ==
Shah co-founded Wayfair in 2002 with his Cornell classmate, Steve Conine, and has been its CEO since its inception.

Shah was included in the Fortune list of "40 under 40" for 2013.

Shah was a director of the Federal Reserve Bank of Boston from 2017 to 2019.

In May 2017, Wayfair's share price rose above $70 per share, making Shah and his co-founder Steve Conine both billionaires. As of April 2022, his estimated net worth was $1.6 billion.

== Philanthropy ==
Shah co-founded the Shah Family Foundation with his wife Jill in 2017, which supports education and healthcare programs.

== Personal life ==
Shah is married to Jill Shah; they have two children, and live in the Back Bay area of Boston. In 2013, Jill Shah sold her alternative medicine directory Jill's List, which employed 7 people, to California-based MINDBODY, and now runs their Boston office.
