= WayfairGate =

2020 conspiracy theory

WayfairGate was a conspiracy theory that falsely alleged that online furniture store Wayfair was acting as a hub for human trafficking. It originated in July 2020, when a number of users on Facebook, Twitter and YouTube started spreading claims that the furniture the company was selling online were actually children.

In 2020, multiple believers of the conspiracy theory falsely stated that an American teenager had been sold as a $10,000 pillow on Wayfair. She was at home with her family at the time. Another 18-year-old girl who was said to have been trafficked on the website recorded and published a video clarifying that no such incident had happened. A Texas teenager who had been missing and then was found in the same month in 2017 was falsely alleged to have been trafficked on the platform.
