= Green Village, New Jersey =

Populated place in Morris County, New Jersey, US

- Census-designated place
- Green Village post office

- Location in Morris County Location in New Jersey Location in the United States
- Coordinates: 40°44′21″N 74°27′13″W
- Country: United States
- State: New Jersey
- County: Morris
- Townships: Chatham and Harding
- Named for: Ashbel Green

Area
  - Total: 2.44 sq mi (6.33 km^{2})
  - Land: 2.34 sq mi (6.07 km^{2})
  - Water: 0.10 sq mi (0.26 km^{2})
- Elevation: 249 ft (76 m)

Population (2020)
  - Total: 1,103
  - Density: 470.7/sq mi (181.74/km^{2})
- ZIP Code: 07935
- FIPS code: 34-28020
- GNIS feature ID: 0876795

Green Village is an unincorporated community and census-designated place (CDP) within Harding and Chatham townships in Morris County, New Jersey, United States. As of the 2020 census, it had a population of 1,103. It is located just north of the Great Swamp National Wildlife Refuge and is named after Ashbel Green, former president of Princeton University.

In the Forbes magazine 2006 ranking of the Most Expensive ZIP Codes in the United States, Green Village was ranked as the 282nd most expensive in the country, with its median home sale price in 2005 of $777,465. As of 2021, the median home value within Green Village was $1,069,200.

== History ==
The village was founded in the 18th century and named for founding father Ashbel Green. One of the earliest houses in the village is that of Elias Boudinot, constructed in 1760 by one of George Washington's generals, William Alexander. The village center was largely created in 1800 by local farmer John Cockrem and his family, which ran a wagon-building company in town, and his son Philip built the local Methodist church and original post office. A new post office would be built during the Eisenhower presidency.

== Geography ==
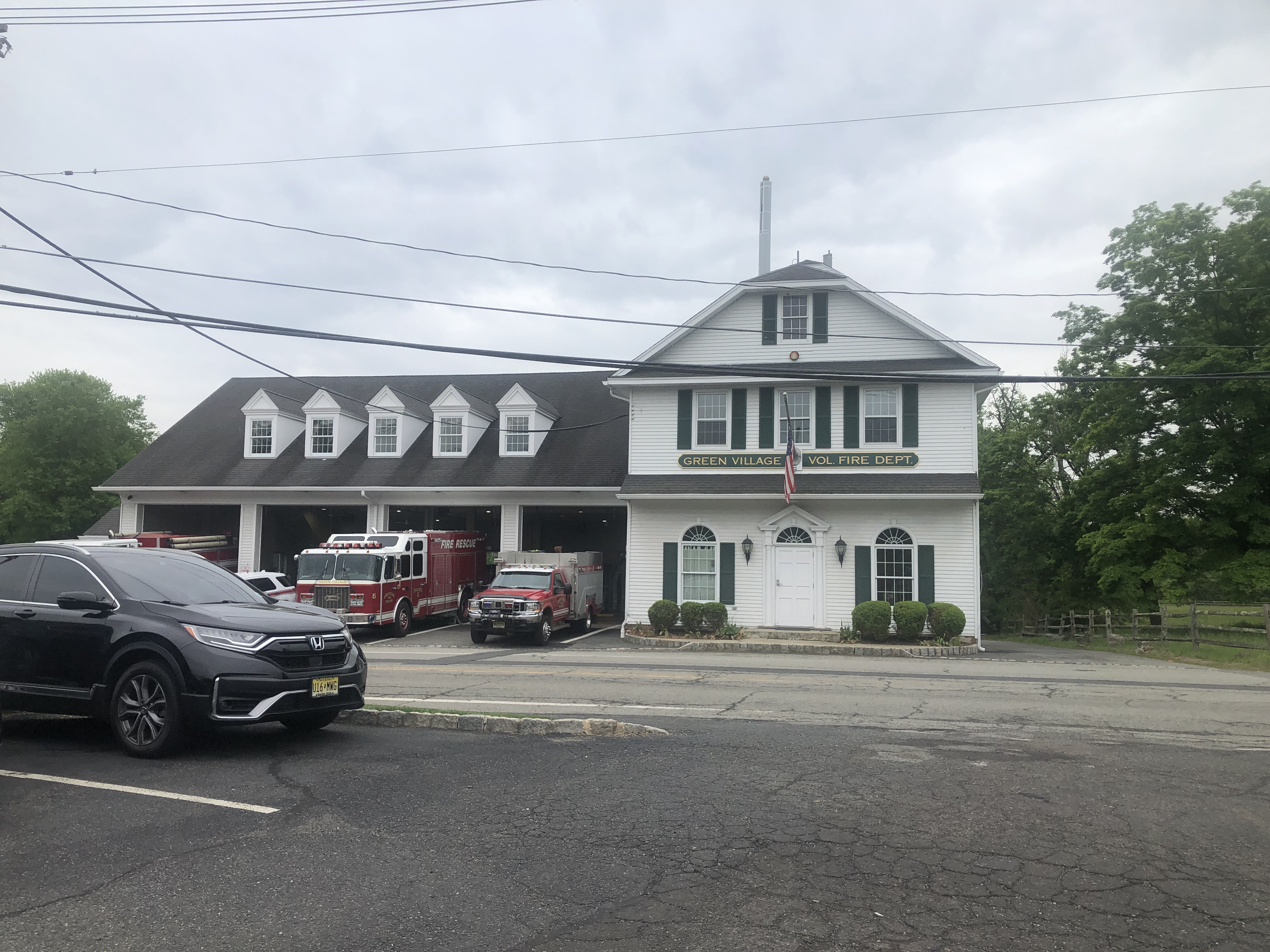
Green Village's firehouse.

Green Village is in southern Morris County, mostly in the western part of Chatham Township, but extending into the eastern part of Harding Township. It is bordered to the northeast by the borough of Madison and to the west by unincorporated New Vernon. Morristown, the county seat, is 5 miles (8 km) to the north. The village is drained by Great Brook and its tributary Loantaka Brook, which flow southwest into the Great Swamp National Wildlife Refuge and thence to the Passaic River. According to the U.S. Census Bureau, the Green Village CDP has a total area of 2.44 square miles (6.32 km^{2}), of which 2.34 square miles (6.06 km^{2}) are land and 0.10 square miles (0.26 km^{2}), or 4.13%, are water.

Green Village has its own post office and fire department, as well as a plant nursery known as The Farm at Green Village, a deli, a Methodist church, and a gas station. Additionally, a number of residents maintain farms and sell produce (including pumpkins, tomatoes, watermelons), eggs, and firewood. Green Village principally consists of three streets, namely Green Village Road, which runs east to Madison and west to New Vernon; and Meyersville Road and Britten Road, which each run south to the Great Swamp. The eastern end of Woodland Road is within the Green Village CDP and ZIP Code area, while the remainder is within New Vernon.

== Demographics ==
Historical population
Census	Pop.	Note	%±
2020	1,103		—
U.S. Decennial Census

Green Village was first listed as a census designated place in the 2020 U.S. census.

Green Village CDP, New Jersey – Racial and ethnic composition Note: the US Census treats Hispanic/Latino as an ethnic category. This table excludes Latinos from the racial categories and assigns them to a separate category. Hispanics/Latinos may be of any race.
Race / Ethnicity (NH = Non-Hispanic)	Pop 2020	2020
White alone (NH)	877	79.51%
Black or African American alone (NH)	10	0.91%
Native American or Alaska Native alone (NH)	0	0.00%
Asian alone (NH)	98	8.88%
Native Hawaiian or Pacific Islander alone (NH)	0	0.00%
Other race alone (NH)	10	0.91%
Mixed race or Multiracial (NH)	41	3.72%
Hispanic or Latino (any race)	67	6.07%
Total	1,103	100.00%

As of 2020, the area had a population of 1,103.

== Education ==
Students attend schools in either Harding Township or Chatham, depending on which side of Green Village they live in.
