= Frederick T. van Beuren Jr. =

American physician and surgeon (1876–1943)

Frederick T. van Beuren Jr. (February 10, 1876 – March 13, 1943) was a physician, surgeon, medical school administrator, professor, researcher, and hospital administrator. He was graduated from the Columbia University College of Physicians and Surgeons. He later became the chief of its surgery clinic and an instructor in surgery. Even later, he became its associate dean and associate clinical professor of surgery. He was a vice president of the New York Academy of Medicine. While researching gastroenterological surgery, he conducted long-term studies at Roosevelt Hospital and Presbyterian Hospital. He also was president of Morristown Memorial Hospital in New Jersey.

During World War I, he was a captain of the Medical Reserve Corps. He spoke publicly supporting medical preparedness and urging physicians to join the war effort. He published a scrapbook related to the examination of the effects of World War I upon American physicians and the medical profession in the United States.

He was a published clinician in peer-reviewed journals, who often was invited to read the results of his clinical studies before many medical organizations and associations in the United States and Canada. He contributed to the Annals of Surgery.

== Career ==
In 1898, van Beuren was awarded a Bachelor of Arts degree by Yale University and in 1902 he was graduated from the Columbia University College of Physicians and Surgeons, with a degree in medicine. Within ten years he was chief of staff at his alma mater's surgery clinic and teaching surgery at the university.

In April 1910, he was elected a fellow of the New York Academy of Medicine where he served as recording secretary (1916–1919), as vice-president (1925–1927), and as a member of the committee on admission (1922–1927), which selected the candidates offered admission. He was given another position at the academy as a member of the committee on medical education in 1926. He also served on the program committee and the building committee.

He was active in community public health activities and services including free clinics and emergency planning. During World War I, van Beuren served as a captain in the federal Medical Reserve Corps that became part of the Council on National Defense (1915–1937), which was organized under the U.S. Army with national leaders who sat on a council that reported directly to the president of the United States. Members of the corps created the national planning to assure that adequate medical services would be available during emergencies, including periods of war. In 1917, members of the Medical Reserve Corps became members of the Medical Officers' Reserve Corps, for the war years, before reverting to their peacetime emergency planning role after the armistice in 1918. In this capacity, Captain van Beuren was invited to attend the semi-annual meeting of the Essex County Medical Society on June 5, 1917, in Elizabethtown, New York as a speaker presented during their Scientific Program. He "...spoke on Medical Preparedness and the need of the National Government for medical men at the present time..." and "...a rising vote of thanks was extended..."

He was assistant attending surgeon at Lincoln Hospital (1910–1913) and at Roosevelt Hospital (1913–1921). He was attending surgeon at Volunteer Hospital (1915–1917) and at Sloane Hospital for Women (1920–1938). After he had become associate dean at his alma mater (1921–1934), the Columbia University College of Physicians and Surgeons, beginning in 1929, he held the position of associate clinical professor of surgery there as well. In 1933 he became president of Morristown Memorial Hospital in New Jersey, another position he held until his death.

He was associate visiting surgeon at Presbyterian Hospital, where for twenty-four years, he conducted clinical research into surgical techniques and equipment. His assessment of that research was read before the New York Surgical Society on February 24, 1943. He also was consulting surgeon at Elizabeth A. Horton Memorial Hospital at Middletown, New York, which now is known as Orange Regional Medical Center.

He was a diplomate of the American Board of Surgery, a Fellow of the American College of Surgeons, a fellow of the American Medical Association. He also was a member of the American Surgical Association, a member of the Medical Society of New Jersey, the Medical Society of the State of New York, the Morris County Medical Society, and the New York County Medical Society.

Many of his illustrations regarding clinical methods, procedures, tools, and techniques also were used in published works in the field of surgery, teaching surgeons new techniques he developed or advised in the emerging field of modern surgery that was made possible through anesthesia and aseptic procedures. Many of his clinical studies were in the field of gastroenterological surgery, documenting the scientific data he gathered to advance medical knowledge about and to enable better diagnoses and choices of treatment for conditions that often resulted in the deaths of patients.

He died at Morristown Memorial Hospital in New Jersey, where he was its president. The New York Times was alerted about his death by the New Jersey newspapers and the Times published an obituary. His death was noted in many professional journals. Science, the journal of the American Association for the Advancement of Science, also published an obituary.

== Family ==
He is a descendant of Johannes van Beuren, who was born in Holland in 1678 and died in Manhattan in 1755, a prominent and prosperous Dutch settler in New York. He was a physician, who had been educated at the University of Leyden, Netherlands, and immigrated to North America in 1700 from Amsterdam. The genealogy of his descendants lists several physicians educated in the United States. Members of later generations of the family resided in structures that were once considered landmarks in the community. Morristown, New Jersey, the county seat, is recorded as the birthplace of many members of the family as well as Manhattan.

When Frederick van Beuren was growing up his family resided on the residue of land secured through a maternal line in Manhattan, but maintained other residences. The family had large tracts of land in Morris County that were supported by a farm on the parcel that measures several square miles. This New Vernon property would become a primary residence for him later in his life. The farm was located on what now is van Beuren Road. The eponymous road divided the property and, after passing near to Silver Lake, reaches Blue Mill Road via a bridge over one of the two tributaries that form the lake.

A family retreat from the city existed on the property, a massive shingled structure on Spring Valley Road. During the latter part of the nineteenth century wealthy members of the Manhattan blue book society built so many luxurious mansions in the Morristown area that it became labeled "the inland Newport" as recreational uses expanded to the mountainous areas (in contrast to the seaside sites to the east of Manhattan). Jessica van Beuren told her granddaughter, Liz van Beuren, that after a trip across the Hudson River, it was a four-hour carriage ride to these properties until the Vanderbilts constructed a rail line to reach the area.

At that time the shingled structure in New Vernon was renovated into a brick structure that is described as one of the notable mansions of the area. It has four stories that included a basement through which a brook ran for fresh water and had household servant quarters on the fourth floor. Frederick Law Olmsted, who had created landscapes for the family residences in Manhattan, was commissioned to design the landscaping for this residence as well. Four other houses on the property served as living quarters for specialized and managerial staff members for the estate, stables, and farm.

At the age of thirty, on May 26, 1906, he married Jessica T. Mohlman and after a "grand tour" honeymoon of Europe, they took up residence on Park Avenue relatively near to the home of his parents. Later they moved to a Fifth Avenue home they retained throughout their lives. Eventually, they spent more time in New Vernon and, in 1933, when van Beuren became the president of Morristown Memorial Hospital, the house facing Spring Valley Road became their primary residence.

Their sons became entrepreneurs, John M. van Beuren an electronics engineer, founded Quan-Tech Laboratories in New Jersey that developed electronic measurement instruments crucial for space exploration because they could predict the life expectancy of resistors, transistors, and diodes and Michael van Beuren an industrial designer who became a Bauhaus furniture designer with international recognition and opened his design studio and a furniture factory in Mexico near another family residence in Cuernavaca. His designs have been featured internationally in prominent museums.

== See also ==
- Holland Society of New York
- The Holland Society of New York web site
- Full text of the Holland Society of New York 1899 Yearbook noting annual dinner, notes, speeches. Attendees included F. T. van Beuren Sr. and Jr., as noted on page 58
