= New Vernon, New Jersey =

Place in Morris County, New Jersey, US

- Census-designated place
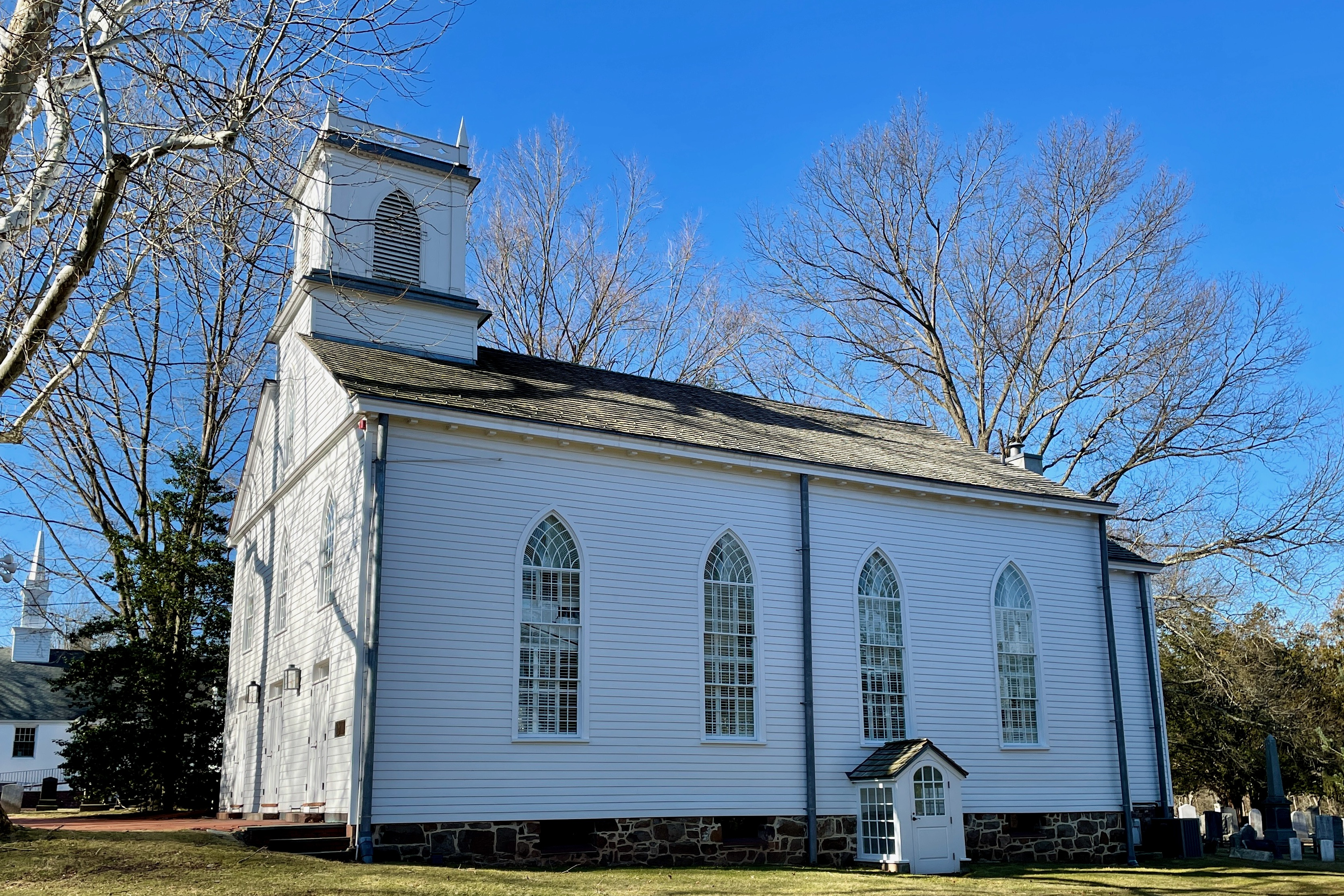
- First Presbyterian Church of New Vernon

- Location in Morris County Location in New Jersey Location in the United States
- Coordinates: 40°44′43″N 74°29′51″W
- Country: United States
- State: New Jersey
- County: Morris
- Township: Harding

Area
  - Total: 3.56 sq mi (9.23 km^{2})
  - Land: 3.55 sq mi (9.20 km^{2})
  - Water: 0.012 sq mi (0.03 km^{2})
- Elevation: 338 ft (103 m)

Population (2020)
  - Total: 825
  - Density: 232.2/sq mi (89.65/km^{2})
- Time zone: UTC−05:00 (Eastern (EST))
  - Summer (DST): UTC−04:00 (Eastern (EDT))
- ZIP Codes: 07976 (New Vernon); 07920 (Basking Ridge); 07960 (Morristown)
- FIPS code: 34-52020
- GNIS feature ID: 878755

New Vernon is an unincorporated community and census-designated place (CDP) in Harding Township, Morris County, New Jersey, United States. New Vernon is the location of the governmental offices for Harding Township. As of the 2020 census, the population of New Vernon was 825.

United States Postal Service ZIP Code 07976 (New Vernon) serves the majority of the CDP, As of the 2010 United States census, the population for ZIP Code Tabulation Area 07976 was 754. while 07920 (Basking Ridge) and 07960 (Morristown) serve more rural parts of the community.

Forbes magazine ranked the New Vernon ZIP Code — 07976 — as one of the 25 most "expensive" ZIP Codes in the country.

== History ==
Abraham Canfield moved to the area c. 1740 and established a country store, blacksmith shop, and cider mill. The community was first called "New Vernon" in a newspaper printed in 1808 at Morristown. The New Vernon Presbyterian Church was established in 1833.

== Historic district ==
- New Vernon Historic District
- U.S. National Register of Historic Places
- U.S. Historic district
- New Jersey Register of Historic Places
- Location: Lee's Hill, Village, Mill Brook and Glen Alpin Roads
- Area: 46 acres (19 ha)
- Architectural style: Federal, Gothic Revival
- NRHP reference No.: 82003288
- NJRHP No.: 2126

Significant dates
- Added to NRHP: July 8, 1982
- Designated NJRHP: February 22, 1982

The New Vernon Historic District is a 46-acre (19 ha) historic district located along Lee's Hill, Village, Mill Brook and Glen Alpin roads in the community. It was added to the National Register of Historic Places on July 8, 1982, for its significance in architecture and exploration/settlement. The district has 24 contributing buildings. The First Presbyterian Church of New Vernon was built in 1833 and features Federal and Gothic Revival styles. The church manse is a brick house built in the 1930s with Tudor architecture. The church education building is also built of brick and features a tower and spire. The contributing Tunis–Ellicks House is home to the Harding Township Historical Society.

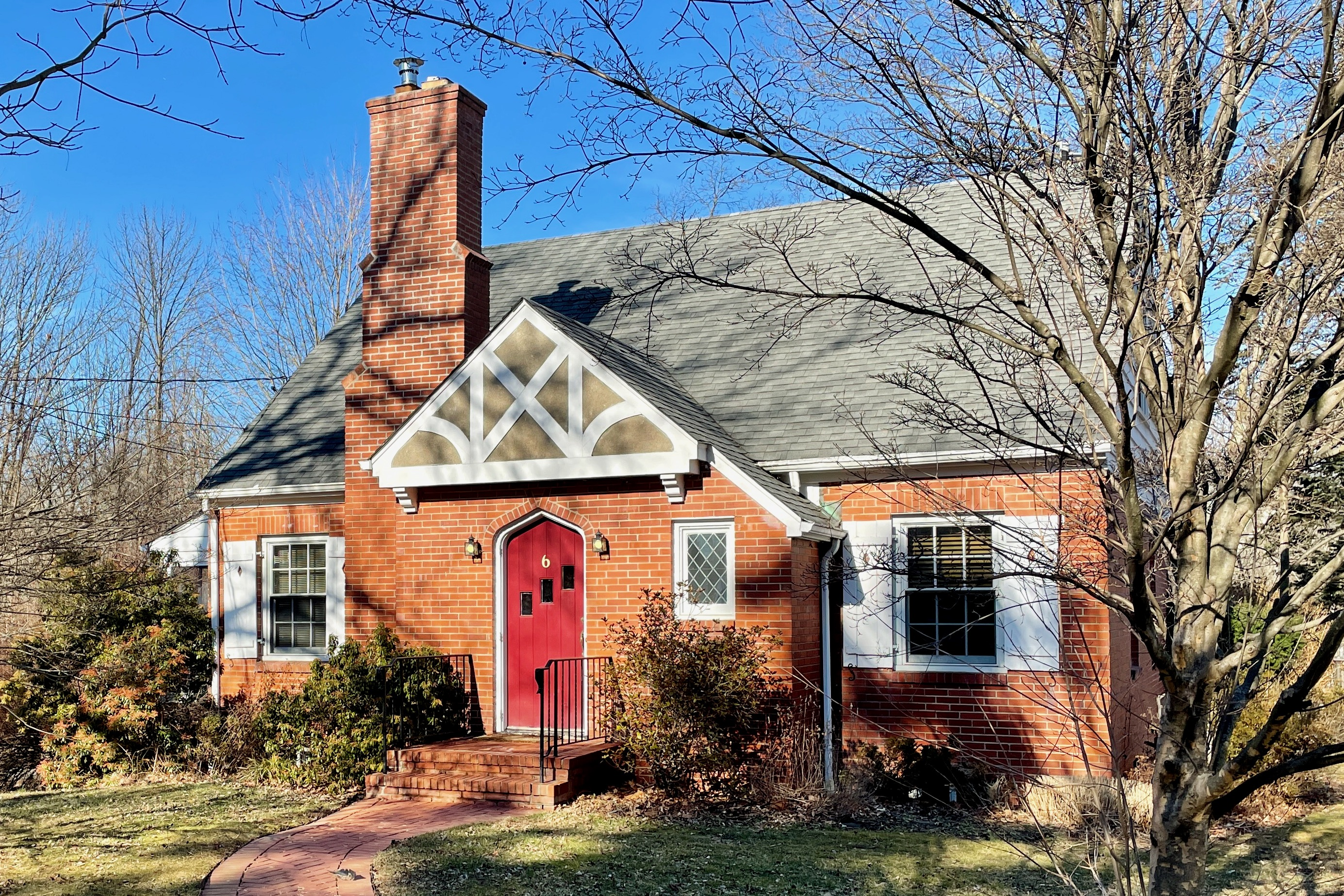
Presbyterian Church manse

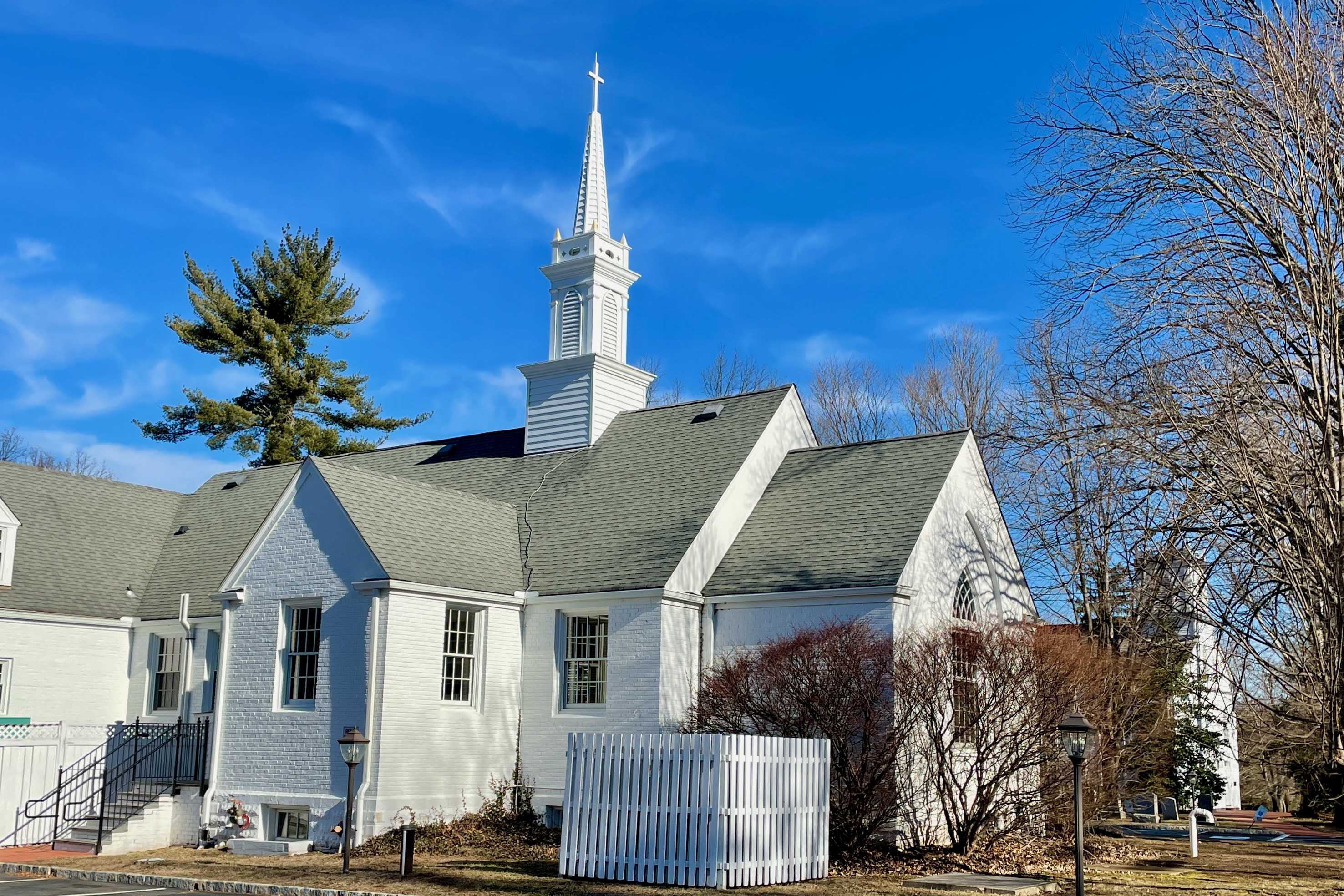
Presbyterian Church education building

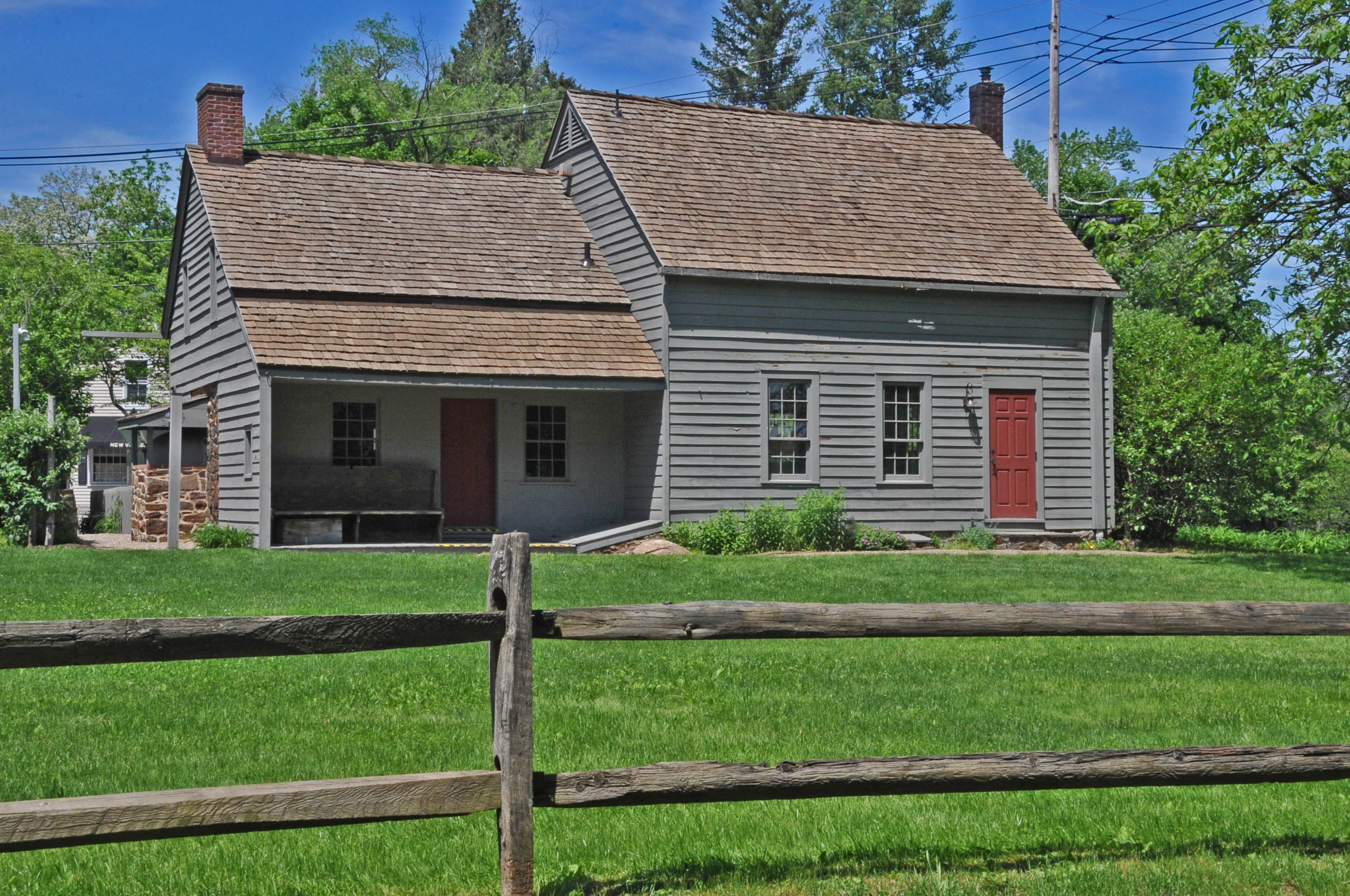
Tunis–Ellicks House Museum

== Geography ==
New Vernon is in southeastern Morris County, in central Harding Township. It is bordered to the east by unincorporated Green Village. Morristown, the county seat, is 4 miles (6 km) to the north, and Basking Ridge is the same distance to the southwest.

According to the U.S. Census Bureau, the New Vernon CDP has a total area of 3.57 square miles (9.25 km^{2}), of which 0.01 square miles (0.03 km^{2}), or 0.34%, are water. The community sits on a hill which drains in all directions to Great Brook, which flows through the Great Swamp National Wildlife Refuge along the southern edge of the community. New Vernon is within the Passaic River watershed.

== Demographics ==
New Vernon was first listed as a census-designated place prior to the 2020 United States census.

Historical population
Census	Pop.	Note	%±
2020	825		—
U.S. Decennial Census; 2020

New Vernon CDP, New Jersey – Racial and ethnic composition Note: the US Census treats Hispanic/Latino as an ethnic category. This table excludes Latinos from the racial categories and assigns them to a separate category. Hispanics/Latinos may be of any race.
Race / Ethnicity (NH = Non-Hispanic)	Pop 2020	2020
White alone (NH)	725	87.88%
Black or African American alone (NH)	0	0.00%
Native American or Alaska Native alone (NH)	1	0.12%
Asian alone (NH)	33	4.00%
Native Hawaiian or Pacific Islander alone (NH)	0	0.00%
Other race alone (NH)	4	0.48%
Mixed race or Multiracial (NH)	28	3.39%
Hispanic or Latino (any race)	34	4.12%
Total	825	100.00%

== Notable people ==
People who were born in, residents of, or otherwise closely associated with New Vernon include:

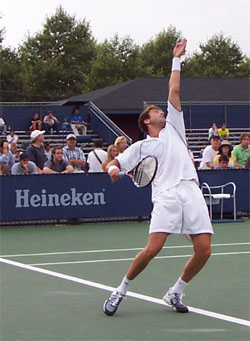
Justin Gimelstob

- William O. Baker (1915–2005), chairman of Bell Laboratories
- Steve Conine (born 1972/73), co-founder of the online retailer Wayfair
- Geraldine Rockefeller Dodge (1882–1973), philanthropist, the first woman invited to judge for the Westminster Kennel Club, a founder of the Seeing Eye Foundation, Saint Hubert's at Giralda, and the Morris and Essex Dog Club; daughter of William Avery Rockefeller, Jr.
- Marcellus Hartley Dodge, Sr. (1881–1963), philanthropist, chairman of Remington Arms Company, president of the Y.M.C.A., and the founder of the Spring Valley Hounds and its horse show; grandson of William E. Dodge Sr. a founder of Phelps, Dodge, and Company, a U.S. congressman (1866–67), and founding member of the YMCA in the United States
- Justin Gimelstob (born 1977), professional tennis player
- Kerry Kittles (born 1974), guard for the New Jersey Nets from 1996 to 2004
- Eric Mangini (born 1971), head coach of the New York Jets from 2005 to 2008
- Morgan Pearson (born 1993), professional triathlete who won a silver medal in the mixed relay event at the 2020 Summer Olympics
- Bo Sullivan (1937-2000), chairman of the New Jersey Turnpike Authority and a Republican Party politician who sought the nomination for governor of New Jersey in the 1981 primary
- Frederick T. van Beuren Jr. (1875–1943), physician and surgeon, who served as a hospital and medical school administrator

== See also ==
- National Register of Historic Places listings in Morris County, New Jersey
