= Wayfair =

American e-commerce company

Wayfair Inc.

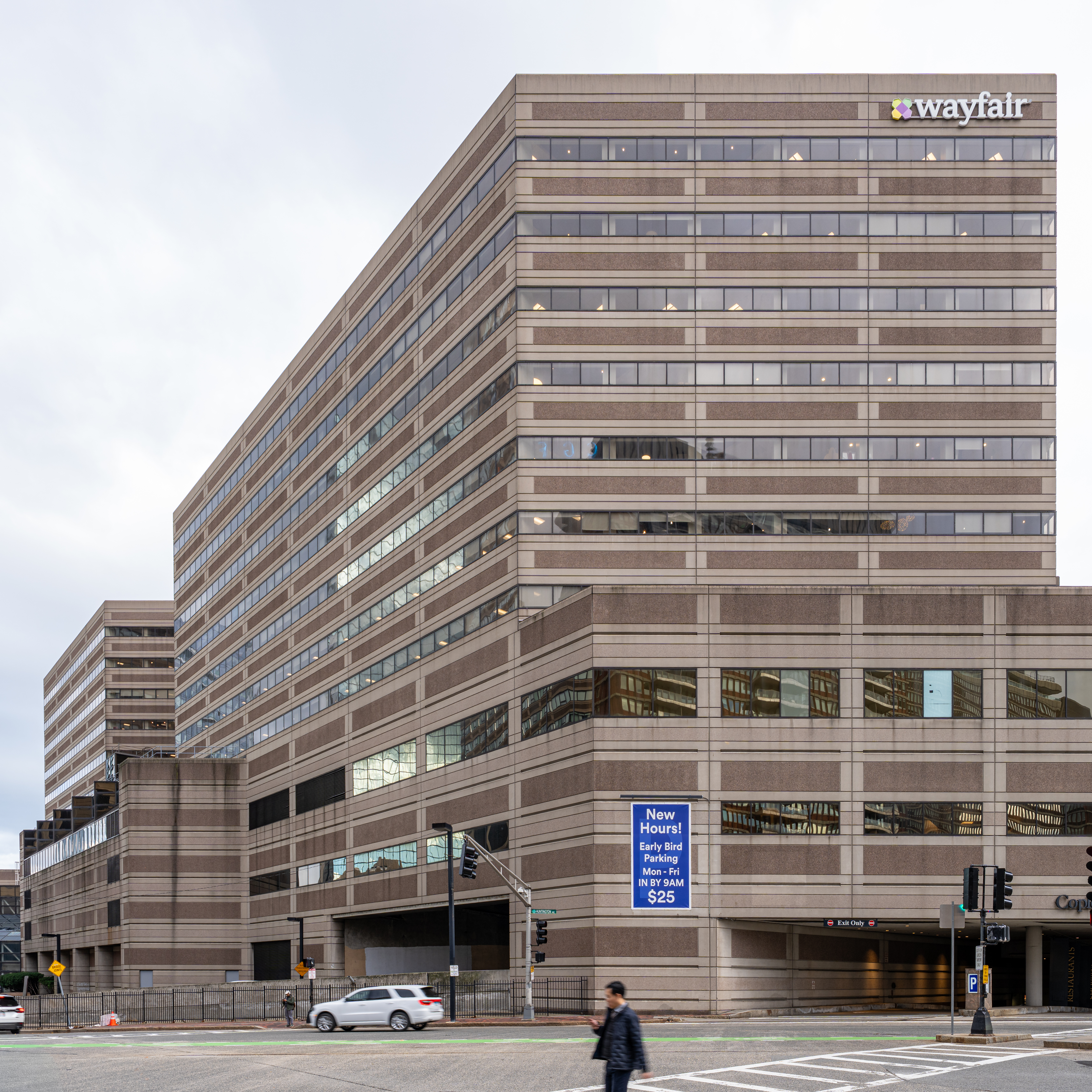
- The Wayfair headquarters in Boston, Massachusetts in 2025
- Formerly: CSN Stores (2002–2011)
- Type: Public
- Traded as: NYSE: W (Class A); Russell 1000 Component
- Industry: E-commerce
- Founded: August 2002; 24 years ago
- Founders: Niraj Shah; Steve Conine
- Headquarters: 4 Copley Place; Boston, Massachusetts, U.S.
- Area served: United States; United Kingdom; Germany; Ireland; Canada
- Key people: Niraj Shah (co-chairman, president & CEO); Steve Conine (co-chairman)
- Services: Online shopping
- Revenue: ▲US$12.46 billion (2025)
- Operating income: ▲US$17 million (2025)
- Net income: ▲US$−313 million (2025)
- Total assets: ▼US$3.44 billion (2025)
- Total equity: ▼US$−2.78 billion (2025)
- Number of employees: ~12,800 (2025)
- ASN: 27475
- Website: wayfair.com

Wayfair Inc. is an American multinational e-commerce company based in Boston, Massachusetts that sells furniture and home goods online. Formerly known as CSN Stores, it was founded in 2002, and currently offers 14 million items from more than 11,000 global suppliers. The company maintains international operations, including locations in North America and in Canada, Ireland, China and the United Kingdom.

Wayfair operates five branded retail websites: the main Wayfair site, Joss & Main, AllModern, Birch Lane, and Perigold.

== History ==
=== Origins and early expansion ===
Entrepreneurs Niraj Shah and Steve Conine founded Wayfair in August 2002 as a two-person company with a makeshift headquarters in Conine's nursery in Boston, Massachusetts. Both Shah and Conine hold a Bachelor of Science degree from Cornell University, and had run two previous companies: Simplify Mobile, and iXL, a global consulting firm.

As of December 2018, Shah is the chief executive officer, and Shah and Conine share the chairman position. Originally known as CSN Stores (derived from a combination of Shah and Conine's initials), the company began with the website racksandstands.com, selling media stands and storage furniture.

In 2003, it added patio and garden goods suppliers, three online stores, and more than a dozen employees, and moved its headquarters to an office on Newbury Street in Boston. Over the next two years, it expanded its catalog to include home décor; office, institutional, and kitchen and dining furniture and materials; home improvement goods; bed and bath materials; luggage and lighting. In 2006, it had $100 million in sales. The company expanded in the United States and into international markets.

In 2008, CSN Stores began shipping to Canada and selling in the United Kingdom, and opened a London office. The Boston Business Journal ranked it the #1 fastest-growing private e-commerce company in Massachusetts, and the #4 fastest-growing private company overall.

In 2009, it expanded to Germany. In 2010, it relocated its headquarters to 177 Huntington Avenue, where they occupied 10 floors. At the end of that year, it launched Joss & Main, a members-only online store.

=== Rebrand and consolidation ===
By 2011, CSN Stores owned over 200 online shops—largely niche shops for specific products, like cookware.com, everyatomicclock.com, and strollers.com. In an effort to scale, direct traffic to a single site, and unify the company aesthetic, Shah and Conine rebranded CSN Stores as Wayfair (a name chosen by a branding firm, with no other meaning). To market its new brand and continue its expansion, in June 2011 the company raised $165 million in funding from the investment firms Battery Ventures, Great Hill Partners, HarbourVest Partners and Spark Capital.

Wayfair.com launched on September 1, 2011. As of July 2012, it had consolidated all of its niche websites, with the exception of Joss & Main and AllModern, into Wayfair.com. In August 2012, it launched Wayfair Supply, a single destination for Wayfair's business, government and institutional customers. In August 2013, it acquired DwellStudio, a New York City-based design house and retailer focused on modern home and family furnishings.

In March 2014, T. Rowe Price led a $157 million pre-IPO financing, valuing the company at more than $2 billion. In late June 2014, the company again relocated its headquarters, this time to 4 Copley Place, about a block from its previous headquarters. It also opened two satellite offices in the surrounding area. In October 2014, Wayfair raised over $300 million through an IPO on the New York Stock Exchange under the ticker symbol W. In July 2015, it sold its Australian business to local online retailer Temple & Webster for an undisclosed amount. The brand was renamed Zizo and later absorbed into the Temple & Webster business. As of January 2014, Wayfair was the largest online-only retailer for home furniture in the United States, and the 33rd largest online retailer in the United States. It generated $380 million in revenue in 2010, over $500 million in 2011, over $600 million in 2012, over $900 million in 2013, and over $1.3 billion in 2014. In 2015, its net revenue increased to $2.25 billion, to $3.4 billion in 2016 and to $4.7 billion in 2017.

Logo from 2016 to 2023

==== Growth and legal ====
Wayfair spent more than $500 million in advertising in 2017 and was on target to spend more in 2018. In 2017, a South Dakota lawsuit aimed at forcing Wayfair to collect and pay state sales tax made it to the US Supreme Court, South Dakota v. Wayfair, Inc. The court held that states may charge tax on purchases made from out-of-state sellers, even if the seller does not have a physical presence in the taxing state. The company hosted its first "Way Day" sale on April 25, 2018. Sales quadrupled compared to an average day in March, according to a report from analytics firm Edison Trends. The number of unique buyers on Way Day also rose nearly 400% compared to the March average, although the average order price spent on Way According to an August 2018 article in The Boston Globe, Wayfair added an additional 2,000 employees in the first half of 2018, and the total number of employees approached 10,000. The company will be soon expanding to another building near Copley Square with office space for an additional 4,000 employees. According to a marketing professor at Emory University, the company is losing $10 for every new customer acquisition.

On December 13, 2018, the Massachusetts Economic Assistance Coordinating Council approved a $31.4 million tax break for Wayfair in exchange for a pledge to increase their hiring by at least 3,000 in Boston and 300 jobs at a new call center in Pittsfield. The tax break is one of the largest ever awarded by the state.

=== Physical retail and restructuring ===
On March 26, 2019, Wayfair announced that its first permanent physical storefront would open in the Natick Mall in Natick, Massachusetts. The retailer had previously tested a few temporary pop-up storefronts during the 2018 holiday season, and confirmed plans to open four additional pop-up storefronts in 2019. Investors sued Wayfair, claiming the company's executives misled them about the company's value and actions, losing them money as the top brass cashed out. The case was dismissed in 2020. In May 2019, Wayfair was added to the Fortune 500 list for the first time, coming in at number 446.

During participation on a business panel on September 19, 2019, CEO Niraj Shah was asked what Wayfair was looking for in new hires and he said the company was looking for employees who are talented and non-political. According to the Boston Business Journal Shah was quoted as saying, "We're generally just looking for people on two sets of criteria. One, it's just that … they're incredibly talented. They're intelligent, quantitative. Just that we think they have the raw material to really succeed and we feel confident. The second thing we look for — equally important — is the cultural fit. So we're bringing in non-political, you know, highly collaborative, just very driven and ambitious. There's a whole lot of cultural values that we think are important while we succeeded. We only hire (those candidates) who have these two sets; both kinds of traits for success." Later, when asked about Shah's comments in the article, Wayfair said in a statement that Shah's quote was "misinterpreted and inaccurately positioned in this story."

==== Employee walk-out ====
On June 25, 2019, Wayfair employees announced plans to walk out in protest of a BCFS contract to sell beds to temporary migrant detention camps in a letter to senior management, including Niraj Shah and Steve Conine. Wayfair leadership responded indicating they would not terminate the order, and did not indicate they would donate the profit from the order (approximately $86,000) to charity, as the letter requested. Congresswoman Alexandria Ocasio-Cortez expressed her support for the employees and the walkout. On June 26, 2019, several hundred Wayfair employees walked out.

In late October 2019, the company announced it had hired 1,500 people in the last quarter, had a net loss of $272 million, and a revenue increase of 36 percent over the previous year.

=== 2020–present ===
On February 13, 2020, the company announced a layoff of 550 employees or about three percent of their global workforce. The headquarters in Boston accounted for 350 of those employees let go, despite having received $31 million in tax breaks from the state. Chief executive Shah notified employees in an e-mail saying, "On reflection this last period of investment went on too long . . . and we find ourselves at a place where we are, from an execution standpoint, investing in too many disparate areas, with an uneven quality and speed of execution." As of 2020, the company had yet to show a profitable quarter.

Wayfair won the 2020 Webby Award for Shopping in the category Apps, Mobile & Voice. On July 10, 2020, Wayfair became the subject of a conspiracy theory known as WayfairGate that accused the company of being involved in child sex trafficking as a front organization. In 2022, Wayfair announced the opening of a flagship store in the King of Prussia Mall outside of Philadelphia, PA.

==== 2022 ====
On August 19, 2022, CEO Niraj Shah penned a letter to employees notifying them that approximately 900 positions were to be laid off. Citing post-pandemic growth that "has not materialized as we had anticipated," Shah continues, "Our team is too large for the environment we are now in, and unfortunately we need to adjust."

In 2022, Wayfair was facing losses and a stock drop of 70% from the beginning of the year through August, and posted a loss of $378 million in Q2 of 2022. The CEO's letter notes severance packages of 10 weeks pay minimum to US-based employees. Those packages are expected to cost the company between $30 and $40 million.

==== 2024 ====
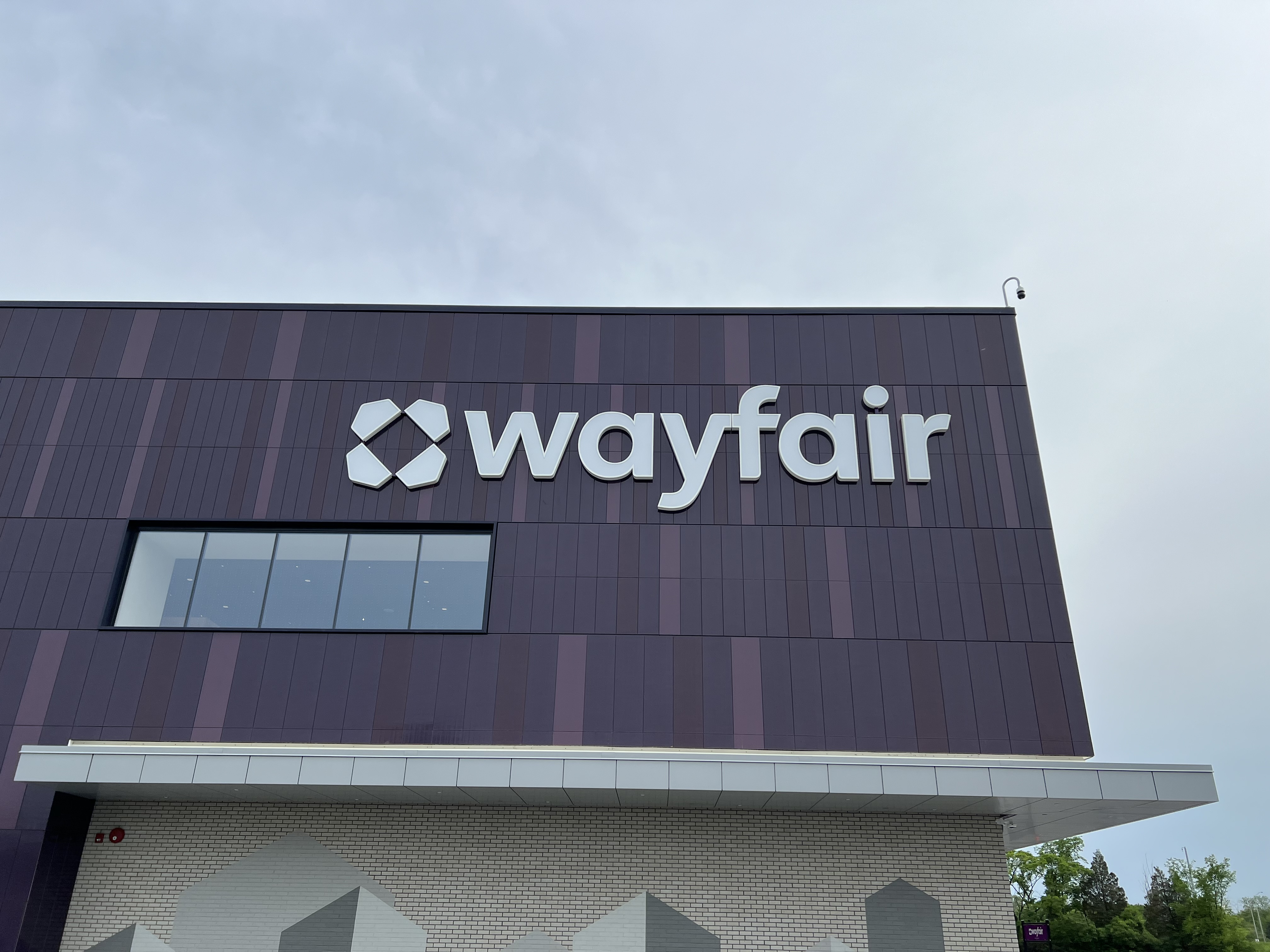
Brick-and-mortar Wayfair store in Wilmette, Illinois

In May 2024, the company opened its first non-outlet, Wayfair-branded physical location at Edens Plaza in Wilmette, Illinois, joining other formerly online-only brands like Warby Parker, Figs, Glossier, and Everlane in opening a brick and mortar location.

==== 2025 ====
In January 10, 2025, Wayfair CEO and Co-founder Niraj Shah announced that they were exiting the German market. The company would withdraw from the German and Austrian markets, leading to a layoff of an estimated 730 positions or 3% of its global workforce. Wayfair Finance Chief Kate Gulliver shared in a statement with the CNBC that the company's aim was to grow its market share where the potential return on investment was higher. Mayor Julien Neubert (SPD) in Lich, Hesse expressed regret publicly for the company's decision to exit the market, citing the impact layoffs would have on his city of about 14,000 residents.

== Brands ==
=== AllModern ===
AllModern first launched in 2006 as an online-exclusive furniture retailer and the first specialty retail brand to launch under CSN Stores. Its collection has taken inspiration from design ideologies such as the Bauhaus movement and the Good Design Era, aiming to evolve timeless designs of minimalist and mid-century furniture. In May 2022, AllModern opened its first brick and mortar store in Lynnfield, Massachusetts, giving customers the new opportunity to see physical products while still offering online access to product options and alternative delivery options that allow customers to buy items in store and take home or purchase in store for fast and free delivery. AllModern has since opened its second store in Dedham, Massachusetts and its most recent store in Austin, Texas.

=== Birch Lane ===
Birch Lane launched under Wayfair in 2014 providing for Wayfair customers who seek out more traditional styles. Birch Lane has made it a point to narrow down their assortment to a fraction of Wayfair's assortment, focusing on a curated selection of traditional and has drawn assortment inspiration from a category of sales under both Wayfair & Joss and Main that Wayfair strategists describe as "traditional twisted" or traditional with a modern twist. Birch Lane has quickly rolled out its physical store initiatives, opening four stores since their initial store opening in March 2024. The stores are all based in Florida in Sarasota, Tampa, Naples, and Boca Raton.

=== Joss & Main ===
Joss & Main is Wayfair's second specialty retail brand to have launched in 2010, as a membership exclusive online retailer providing access to flash sales on home furnishing and decor brands. Joss and Main has brick and mortar stores in Burlington, Massachusetts and Oak Brook, Illinois.

=== Perigold ===
Perigold launched in 2017 as Wayfair's first luxury home retail brand. The brand is known for its higher end designer brands in comparison to its Wayfair counterparts and offers top-tier customer service, free design services, and shipping advantages. Perigold have opened their first physical retail stores in 2025 in Houston, Texas and West Palm Beach, Florida.

== Operations and infrastructure ==
Wayfair has over 12 million square feet of warehouse space in Europe and North America with a dozen fulfillment centers. As of 2019, the company offers 14 million products from 11,000 global suppliers. Wayfair employs over 2,300 engineers and data scientists and 3,000 customer service representatives in Boston; Berlin; Ireland; and other cities in the United States. The company expected to spend more than $1 billion in marketing and advertising in 2019.

== Board of directors ==
As of October 2021, the board of directors is:

Niraj Shah	Co-Founder, Chief Executive Officer, Director (Co-Chairman)
Steven Conine	Co-Founder, Director (Co-Chairman)
Michael Choe	Director
Jeremy King	Director
Andrea Jung	Director
Michael Kumin	Director
Anke Schäferkordt	Director
Jeffrey Naylor	Director
Michael E. Sneed	Director
